= List of Buddhist architecture in China =

The following is a non-exhaustive list of Buddhist temples, monasteries, pagodas, grottoes, archaeological sites and colossal statues in China.

== Buddhist temples ==
=== Anhui ===
- Mount Jiuhua
  - Baisui Palace
  - Ganlu Temple (Mount Jiuhua)
  - Huacheng Temple
  - Shrine of Living Buddha
  - Tiantai Temple (Mount Jiuhua)
  - Zhantalin
  - Zhiyuan Temple (Mount Jiuhua)
  - Baisuigong Temple
  - Qiyuansi Temple
  - Roushen Temple
  - Tianchi Temple
  - Dabeilou Temple
- Guangji Temple (Wuhu)
- Langya Temple
- Mingjiao Temple (Anhui)
- Sanzu Temple
- Shangchan Temple
- Yingjiang Temple
- Zhenfeng Pagoda

=== Beijing ===
- Badachu
- Bailin Temple (Beijing)
- Baipu Temple
- Big Bell Temple (or Juesheng Temple)
- Cheng'en Temple
- Cloud Platform at Juyongguan
- Dahui Temple
- Dajue Temple
- Dule Temple
- Fahai Temple
- Fayuan Temple
- Guanghua Temple (Beijing)
- Guangji Temple (Beijing)
- Hongluo Temple
- Jietai Temple
- Lingguang Temple (Beijing)
- Miaoying Temple
- Pagoda of Tianning Temple
- Tanzhe Temple
- Temple of Azure Clouds
- Tiankai Temple
- Tianning Temple (Beijing)
- Tongjiao Temple
- Wanshou Temple
- Wofo Temple
- Xifeng Temple
- Xihuang Temple
- Yonghe Temple
- Yunju Temple
- Zhenjue Temple
- Zhihua Temple

=== Chongqing ===
- Ciyun Temple (Chongqing)
- Luohan Temple (Chongqing)
- Shuanggui Temple
- Tongliang Iron Buddha Temple
- Chaoyang North Tower

=== Fujian ===
- Chengtian Temple (Quanzhou)
- Chongfu Temple (Quanzhou)
- Chongsheng Temple (Fujian)
- Cishou Temple
- Dizang Temple (Fuzhou)
- Guanghua Temple (Putian)
- Guangxiao Temple (Putian)
- Hualin Temple (Fuzhou)
- Huayan Temple (Ningde)
- Jinshan Temple (Fujian)
- Kaiyuan Temple (Quanzhou)
- Linyang Temple
- Longshan Temple (Jinjiang)
- Nanshan Temple
- Pagoda of Cishou Temple
- South Putuo Temple
- Wanfu Temple
- Xichan Temple (Fujian)
- Yongquan Temple (Fuzhou)

=== Gansu ===
- Dafo Temple (Zhangye)
- Labrang Monastery
- Ta'er Temple (Suoyang City)
- White Horse Pagoda, Dunhuang

=== Guangdong ===
- Guangxiao Temple (Guangzhou)
- Hoi Tong Monastery
- Kaiyuan Temple (Chaozhou)
- Lingshan Temple (Shantou)
- Nanhua Temple
- Qingyun Temple (Guangdong)
- Temple of the Six Banyan Trees
- Yunmen Temple (Guangdong)

=== Guizhou ===
- Hongfu Temple (Guiyang)
- Qianming Temple

=== Hainan ===
- Nanshan Temple (Sanya)

=== Hebei ===
- Bailin Temple
- Geyuan Temple
- Iron Buddha Temple (Dongguang)
- Kaishan Temple
- Liaodi Pagoda
- Lingxiao Pagoda
- Linji Temple
- Longxing Monastery
- Pagoda of Bailin Temple
- Pagoda of Tiangong Temple
- Puning Temple (Hebei)
- Putuo Zongcheng Temple
- Xumi Pagoda
- Guanghui Temple Huatai Pagoda

=== Henan ===
- Daxingguo Temple
- Fawang Temple
- Fragrant Mountain Temple at Longmen Grottoes
- Iron Pagoda
- Jidu Temple
- Jinshan Temple (Hebi)
- Pagoda Forest at Shaolin Temple
- Qizu Pagoda
- Shaolin Monastery
- Songyue Pagoda
- White Horse Temple
- Xiangyan Temple
- Youguo Temple

=== Inner Mongolia Autonomous Region ===
- Five Pagoda Temple (Hohhot)

=== Hubei ===
- Guiyuan Temple
- Baotong Temple
- Iron Buddha Temple (Xiangfan)
- Wuying Pagoda
- Wuzu Temple

=== Hunan ===
- Baiyun Temple (Ningxiang)
- Fuyan Temple
- Grand Temple of Mount Heng
- Guangji Temple (Hunan)
- Kaifu Temple
- Lingsheng Temple
- Lushan Temple
- Miyin Temple
- Nantai Temple
- Puguang Temple (Zhangjiajie)
- Puji Temple (Ningxiang)
- Shangfeng Temple
- Yunmen Temple (Hunan)
- Zhaoshan Temple
- Zhusheng Temple (Hunan)

=== Hong Kong ===
- Cham Shan Monastery
- Chi Lin Nunnery
- Miu Fat Buddhist Monastery
- Po Lin Monastery
- Ten Thousand Buddhas Monastery
- Tsing Shan Monastery
- Tsz Shan Monastery
- Tung Lin Kok Yuen
- Tung Po Tor Monastery

=== Jiangsu ===
- Chongshan Temple (Jiangsu)
- Daming Temple
- Dinghui Temple
- Gaomin Temple
- Guangjiao Temple (Nantong)
- Hanshan Temple
- Huiji Temple (Nanjing)
- Huqiu Tower
- Jiming Temple
- Jinshan Temple (Zhenjiang)
- Linggu Temple
- Lingyanshan Temple
- Longchang Temple
- Niushoushan
- Qingliang Temple (Changzhou)
- Qixia Temple
- Tianning Temple (Changzhou) (天宁宝塔) in Changzhou, which contains the tallest pagoda in the world. Height: 153.8 metres (505 ft).
- Tiger Hill Pagoda
- Xingfu Temple (Changshu)
- Xiyuan Temple
- Yunyan Temple (Suzhou)

=== Jiangxi ===
- Donglin Temple
- Jingju Temple (Ji'an)
- Nengren Temple (Jiujiang)
- Puning Temple (Jiangxi)
- Zhenru Temple (Jiangxi)

=== Jilin ===
- Banruo Temple (Changchun)
- Dizang Temple (Changchun)
- Guanyin Ancient Temple

=== Liaoning ===
- Banruo Temple (Shenyang)
- Ci'en Temple (Liaoning)
- Fengguo Temple
- Guangji Temple (Jinzhou)
- Zhiyuan Temple (Panjin)

=== Macau ===
- Kun Iam Temple, (also known as Pou Chai Temple, Chinese: 普濟禪院)

=== Ningxia ===
- Baisigou Square Pagoda
- Haibao Pagoda Temple
- Hongfo Pagoda
- One Hundred and Eight Stupas
- Pagoda of Chengtian Temple

=== Shaanxi ===
- Caotang Temple
- Daci'en Temple
- Daxingshan Temple
- Famen Temple
- Giant Wild Goose Pagoda
- Guangren Temple
- Jianfu Temple
- Jingye Temple
- Qinglong Temple (Xi'an)
- Shuilu'an Temple
- Small Wild Goose Pagoda
- Wolong Temple
- Xiangji Temple (Shaanxi)
- Xingjiao Temple

=== Shandong ===
- Four-gates pagoda
- Lingyan Temple (Jinan)
- Pizhi Pagoda
- Xingguo Temple (Jinan)
- Zhanshan Temple (Shandong)

=== Shanghai ===
- Baoshan Temple
- Chenxiang Pavilion
- Donglin Temple (Shanghai)
- Hongfu Temple (Shanghai)
- Jade Buddha Temple
- Jing'an Temple
- Longhua Temple
- Yuanming Jiangtang
- Zhenru Temple (Shanghai)

=== Shanxi ===
- Mount Wutai
  - Bishan Temple
  - Dailuoding
  - Foguang Temple
  - Great White Pagoda
  - Guangji Temple (Mount Wutai)
  - Guangzong Temple (Mount Wutai)
  - Guanhai Temple
  - Gufo Temple
  - Jifu Temple
  - Jile Temple
  - Jinge Temple
  - Longhua Temple
  - Luomuhou Temple
  - Mimi Temple
  - Nanchan Temple
  - Nanshan Temple (Mount Wutai)
  - Puhua Temple
  - Pusading
  - Qixian Temple (Mount Wutai)
  - Shifang Temple
  - Shouning Temple
  - Shuxiang Temple
  - Tayuan Temple
  - Wanfo Ge
  - Wenshu Temple (Mount Wutai)
  - Xiantong Temple
  - Yanshan Temple
  - Youguo Temple
  - Zhanshan Temple (Mount Wutai)
  - Zhenrong Temple
  - Zhulin Temple
  - Zunsheng Temple
- Chongshan Temple (Shanxi)
- Guangji Temple (Xinzhou)
- Huayan Temple (Datong)
- Iron Buddha Temple (Linfen)
- Iron Buddha Temple (Gaoping)
- Pagoda of Fogong Temple
- Puhua Temple
- Qifo Temple
- Shuanglin Temple
- The Hanging Temple
- Xuanzhong Temple
- Yanqing Temple
- Yuanzhao Temple
- Zhenguo Temple

=== Sichuan ===
- Mount Emei
  - Baoguo Temple (Mount Emei)
  - Fuhu Temple
  - Hongchunping Temple
  - Huazang Temple
  - Qingyin Pavilion
  - Wannian Temple
  - Xixiang Chi
  - Xianfeng Temple
- Bao'en Temple (Pingwu)
- Baoguang Temple
- Luohan Temple (Shifang)
- Qiongzhu Temple
- Wenshu Temple (Chengdu)
- Wuyou Temple
- Zhaojue Temple

=== Tianjin ===
- Guangji Temple (Tianjin)
- Temple of Great Compassion

=== Tibet Autonomous Region (Xizang) ===
- Chokorgyel Monastery
- Dorje Drak
- Drepung Monastery
- Drongtse Monastery
- Dzogchen Monastery
- Ganden Monastery
- Jokhang Monastery
- Kathok
- Khorzhak Monastery
- Menri Monastery
- Mindrolling Monastery
- Nechung
- Palpung Monastery
- Palyul
- Ralung Monastery
- Sakya Monastery
- Samding Monastery
- Samdrup Tarjayling
- Samye
- Sera Monastery
- Shechen Monastery
- Simbiling Monastery
- Surmang Monastery
- Tashi Lhunpo Monastery
- Tsi Nesar
- Tsurphu Monastery
- Yerpa
- Yundgrung Ling Monastery

=== Yunnan ===
- Chongshan Temple (Yunnan)
- Foguang Temple (Mangshi)
- Guangyun Temple
- Huating Temple
- Jinlong Temple
- Mange Temple
- Puti Temple
- Qiongzhu Temple
- Three Pagodas
- Tongwadian (Dali)
- Wuyun Temple (Mangshi)
- Yuantong Temple
- Zhusheng Temple (Yunnan)

=== Zhejiang ===
- Mount Putuo
  - Bukenqu Guanyin Temple
  - Huiji Temple (Mount Putuo)
  - Fayu Temple
  - Puji Temple
- Baoguo Temple (Zhejiang)
- Dafo Temple (Xinchang)
- Guoqing Temple
- Iron Buddha Temple (Huzhou)
- Jingci Temple
- Jiangxin Temple
- Jingju Temple (Yiwu)
- Lingyin Temple
- Liuhe Pagoda
- Mingjiao Temple (Zhejiang)
- Qita Temple
- Temple of King Ashoka
- Tiantong Temple
- Yanfu Temple (Wuyi County)

== Grottoes ==
- Bezeklik Thousand Buddha Caves
- Bingling Temple
- Dazu Rock Carvings
- Hidden Stream Temple Cave
- Kizil Caves
- Longmen Grottoes
- Middle Binyang Cave
- Mogao Caves
- Mount Emei
- Mount Xumi Grottoes
- Mutou Valley
- North Binyang Cave
- South Binyang Cave
- Stone Sculptures on Yaowang Mountain
- Tuoshan
- Yungang Grottoes

== Statues ==
- Jade Buddha Palace
- Thousand-Armed Thousand-Eyed Guanyin in Longxing Temple
- Grand Buddha at Ling Shan
- Guanyin Statue of Hainan
- Guanyin of Mount Xiqiao
- Guan Yin of the South Sea
- Leshan Giant Buddha
- Ming bronze sculpture of Mount Sumeru in Beijing
- Maitreya Buddha at Bingling Temple
- Rongxian Buddha
- Spring Temple Buddha
- Statue of Kun Iam in Macau
- Ten Directions Samantabhadra Bodhisattva
- Tian Tan Buddha (The Big Buddha) in Hong Kong
- White marble Guanyin of Yinxian
