= Xingguo Temple =

Xingguo Temple (simplified Chinese: 兴国寺; traditional Chinese: 興國寺; pinyin: Xīngguó Sì), may refer to:

- Xingguo Temple (Jinan), in Jinan, Shandong, China
- Xingguo Temple (Binzhou), in Binzhou, Shandong, China
- Xingguo Temple (Qin'an County), in Qin'an County, Gansu, China
