= Mingjiao Temple =

Mingjiao Temple (Chinese: 明教寺; pinyin: Míngjiào Sì), may refer to:

- Mingjiao Temple (Anhui), in Hefei, Anhui, China
- Mingjiao Temple (Zhejiang), in Zhuji, Zhejiang, China
