= Gaomin Temple =

Buddhist temple in Yangzhou, China

- 高旻寺
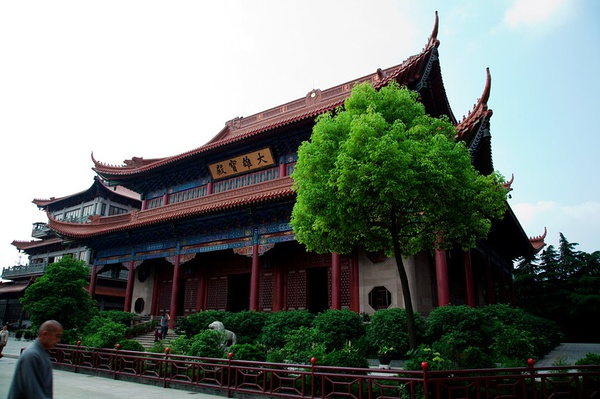
- Gaomin Temple

- Location within Jiangsu

Religion
- Affiliation: Buddhist

Location
- Location: Hanjiang District of Yangzhou, Jiangsu Province, China
- Coordinates: 32°19′36″N 119°24′46″E

Architecture
- Established: Sui dynasty
- Completed: 1651 (reconstruction)

Gaomin Temple (Chinese: 高旻寺; pinyin: Gāomín Sì) is a historic Buddhist Temple in Hanjiang District of Yangzhou, Jiangsu Province of China. During the Qing dynasty, it was considered one of the eight great temples of Yangzhou.

The temple is situated in a semi-rural setting about 7 km south of downtown Yangzhou. It is on the western shore of the Old Channel of the Grand Canal of China, just south of its junction with the Yizheng-Yangzhou Canal.

== History ==
Gaomin temple was first built in the Sui dynasty, and achieved its largest area in the Qing dynasty, when it was expanded twice. In 1651, Tianzhong Tower was built, as well as a temple next to it called the Tower Temple. During the Kangxi Emperor's (r. 1661–1722) stay in the temple in his fourth southern tour, he climbed on Zhongtian Tower, overlooking the scenery, which was very beautiful and vast. Then named the temple for Gaomin Temple. 42 years after the Kangxi Emperor was enthroned (1703), Towerbaypalace (Chinese name: 塔湾行宫) was built in west of Gaomin Temple. During the Kangxi Emperor's fifth southern tour, his palace's area was much bigger than Gaomin Temple, and they were separated by high walls. At that time, Gaomin Temple, Zhenjiang's Jinshan Temple, Chengdu's Geyuan Temple and Xindu's Baoguang Temple were known as the greatest four Zen temples.

During the Kangxi era, there were five halls in it to worship Buddha, and pavilions(Chinese:碑御亭) on the left and right. Behind it, there was Gold Buddha hall, behind which Zhongtian Tower stood. They were all destroyed in the Daoguang and Xianfeng eras. Then in the Tongzhi and Guangxu eras, they were rebuilt, with an installation of two- layer Yushu Building.

During Monk Laiguo's chairing the temple, he got rid of the old disadvantages and regressed to the old system, which made a great achievement. The pagodas, halls, Zen rooms, Yanshou Tang were rebuilt, that made Gaomin Temple take shape. After 1949, Gaomin was used and managed by Buddhists. However, during the Cultural Revolution, it was occupied by the Red Guards. They dismantled the halls and fixed other buildings, setting the temple on the verge of waste.

After the 3rd Plenary Session of the 11th Central Committee of the Chinese Communist Party, a policy of some religious freedom was implemented. In 1983, Gaomin Temple was listed as one of the key Han national temples. After the efforts of the relevant departments, Gaomin temple was handed over to the Buddhists.

In recent years, Gaomin Temple steps to rebuild temples with the foundings. With Hong Kong Buddhists' donations, Gaomin Temple's new Zen halls held an opening ceremony in November 1989.

== Layout ==
In the Qing dynasty (1644–1912) Gaomin Temple and the palace's area was larger than now. The palace, located in the center, covered fourth fifths of the area, whereas the temple, which lay east of the palace, occupied only one fifth.
