= Zhiyuan Temple =

Zhiyuan Temple (simplified Chinese: 祗园寺; traditional Chinese: 祗園寺; pinyin: Zhīyuán Sì) may refer to:

- Zhiyuan Temple (Mount Jiuhua), on Mount Jiuhua, in Qingyang County, Anhui, China
- Zhiyuan Temple (Panjin), in Panjin, Liaoning, China
