= Yunmen Temple =

Yunmen Temple (simplified Chinese: 云门寺; traditional Chinese: 雲門寺; pinyin: Yúnmén Sì), may refer to:

- Yunmen Temple (Guangdong), in Shaoguan, Guangdong, China
- Yunmen Temple (Hunan), in Xiangxiang, Hunan, China
- Yunmen Temple (Fujian), in Changle, Fujian, China
