= Stone Sculptures on Yaowang Mountain =

Coordinates: 34.9058°N 108.9767°E

The Stone Sculptures on Yaowang Mountain are located on Yaowang Mountain (药王山) 1.5 kilometers east of the Yaoxian county seat, in Shaanxi, China.

There are 200 stone tablets at Yaowang Mountain, erected during past dynasties; seven grottoes of the Sui and Tang dynasties; as well as Buddhist statues from the Northern Wei dynasty to the Tang dynasty.

== See also ==
- List of Buddhist architecture in China
