= Mange Temple =

Buddhist temple in Yunnan, China

- 曼阁佛寺
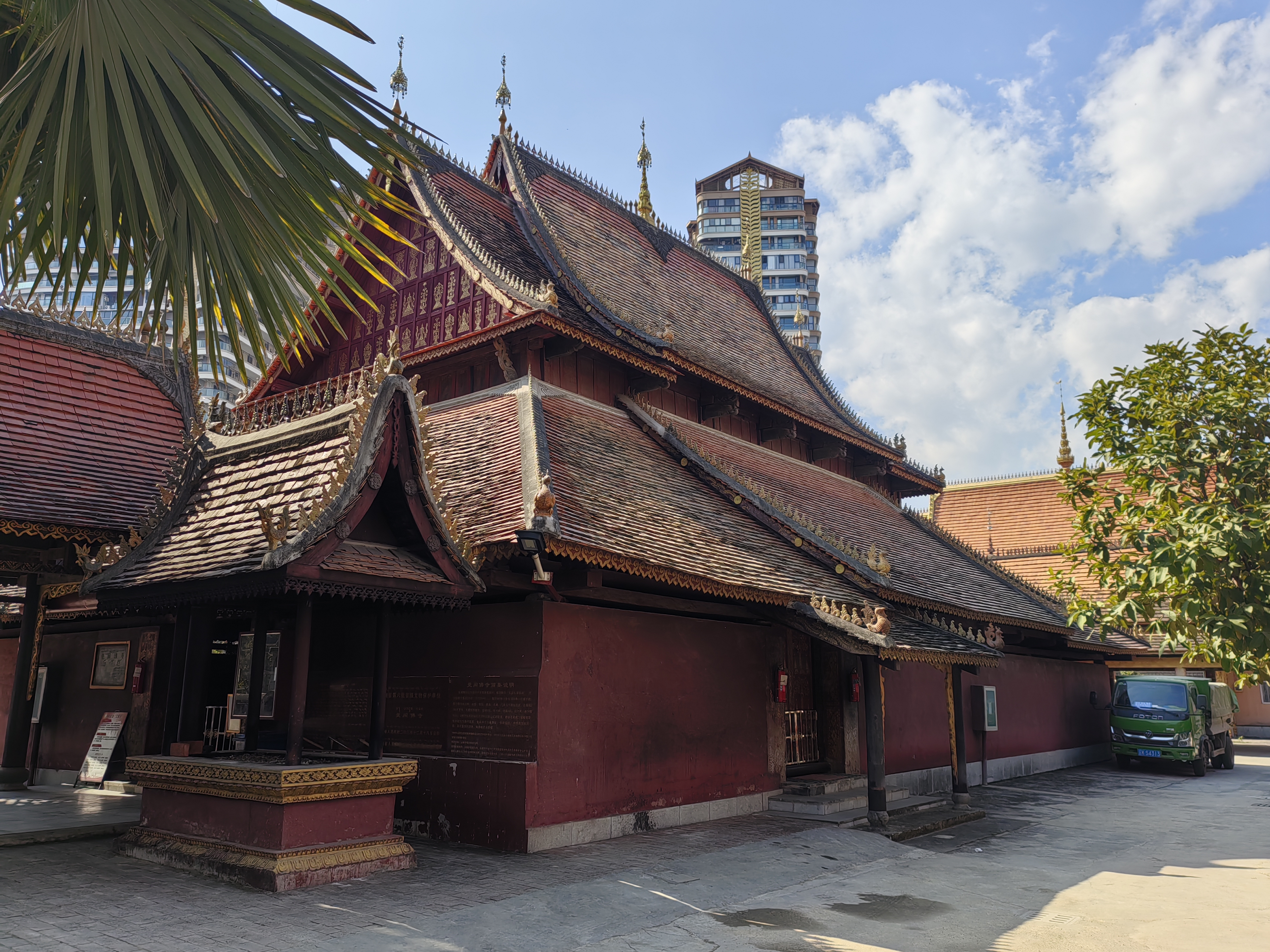

- Location within Yunnan Location within China

Religion
- Affiliation: Buddhism
- Sect: Theravada
- District: Jinghong
- Prefecture: Xishuangbanna Dai Autonomous Prefecture
- Province: Yunnan

Location
- Country: China
- Prefecture: Xishuangbanna Dai Autonomous Prefecture
- Coordinates: 22°01′51″N 100°48′17″E

Architecture
- Style: Chinese architecture
- Established: 1477

Mange Temple (simplified Chinese: 曼阁佛寺; traditional Chinese: 曼閣佛寺; pinyin: Màngé Fó Sì; Tai Lü: ᦞᧆ ᦢᦱᧃᧉ ᦅᦸᧉ) is a Buddhist temple located in Jinghong of Xishuangbanna Dai Autonomous Prefecture, Yunnan, China. Covering an area of 1,300-square-metre (0.32-acre), the temple is bordered by Lancang River in the north. Built in 1477, the temple is one of the oldest temples in Xishuangbanna Dai Autonomous Prefecture.

== History ==
According to historic records, the temple was first built in 1477, in the 13th year of Chenghua period (1465–1487) in the Ming dynasty (1368–1644), with a history of more than 500 years.

== Architecture ==
The temple consists of more than 7 buildings. The complex includes the following halls: Main Hall, Scripture Hall, Monk's Houses, Drum tower, Ordination Hall, corridors and door kiosks.

=== Main Hall ===
The main hall also known as "Buddha Hall", is an 11-metre (36 ft) long and 10-metre (33 ft) wide building with double eaves, three slopes and no columns (无柱重檐三面坡建筑). The Dai style roof is high and steep in slopes because it is surrounded by 16 red painted ailanthus wood columns with lacquered flower patterns. They are decorated with sparrow braces and hanging fascia. The ceiling is painted with patterns characteristic of Dai style art. The walls feature paintings depicting stories of Sakyamuni's becoming Buddha, in the style of Dai frescos. Other frescos depict images of Chinese dragons, white elephants, phoenixes, peacocks and female celestials.

In the center of the main hall enshrines a 4-metre (13 ft) high gilded statue of Sakyamuni. The various statues of Buddha and animals are placed in front of the statue of Sakyamuni. Before the statue of Sakyamuni, long flags which are known as Dong in Dai language are hung from the beams, 4 metres (13 ft) in length, they have colorful patterns and flying silver and gold foil streamers hanging down from the beams.

=== Ordination Hall ===
The Ordination Hall is an 5-metre (16 ft) long and 3.75-metre (12.3 ft) wide building with double eaves, three slopes and no columns. A 1.7-metre (5 ft 7 in) high sumeru throne is placed in the middle of the hall. A 0.3-metre (1 ft 0 in) high statue of Sakyamuni is sitting on the sumeru throne.
