= Hidden Stream Temple Cave =

Cave in Henan, China

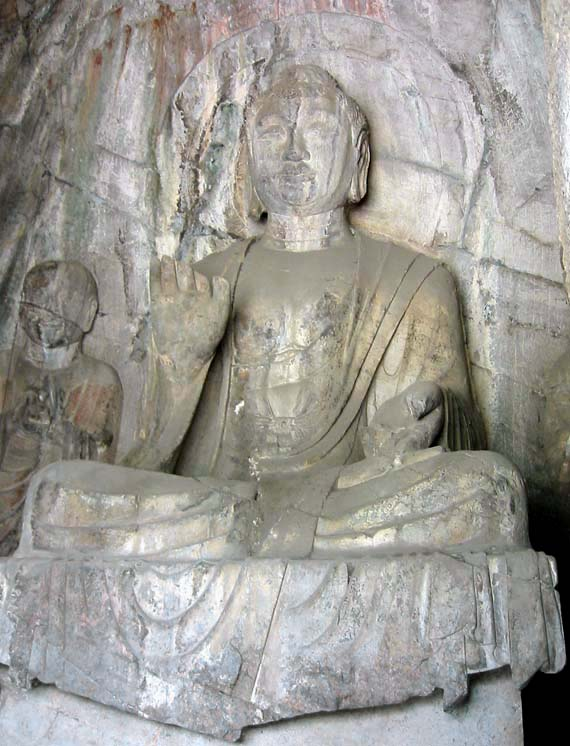
Central Amitabha figure. Hidden Stream Temple Cave. (May 2004)

The Hidden Stream Temple Cave (Chinese: 潜溪寺洞; pinyin: qián xī sì dòng also zhai fu tang) is cave number 20 at the Longmen Grottoes near Luoyang, Henan, China. The Longmen Grottoes are designated as a UNESCO world heritage site.

== History ==
The cave was first carved during the reign of Tang Emperor Gaozong in late 600 CE. The cave had wooden structured eaves added in the Qing dynasty, but these were not maintained. In 1990 an outer room imitating the Tang style was rebuilt and the floor was paved with bricks.

== Features ==
The central statue is a large Amitabha seated on a square pedestal with loose clothes, a naked chest and a plump face. His hands take the abhaya mudra, symbolising fearlessness. The bodhisattvas Avalokitesvara and Mahasthamaprapta stand to each side; together the group of three represent the three saints from the west worshipped by the Pure Land Sect of Buddhism. Two armoured heavenly kings protect the entrance.

There are also two line engraved buddhas in a niche on the southern wall outside the cave.
