= Qiongzhu Temple =

Buddhist temple in Yunnan, China

Coordinates: 25°4′7.99″N 102°37′43.93″E

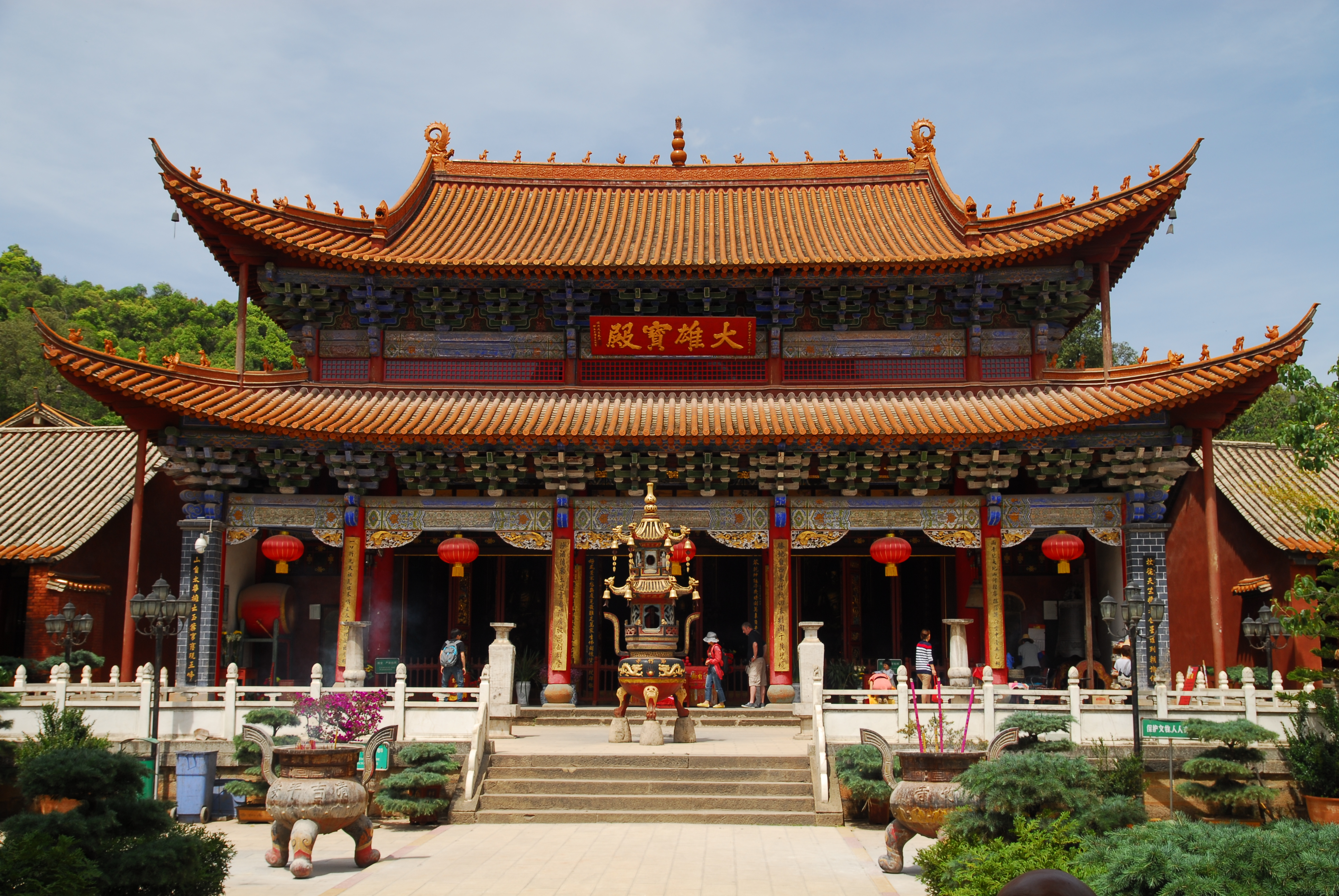
The main building of the Qiongzhu temple

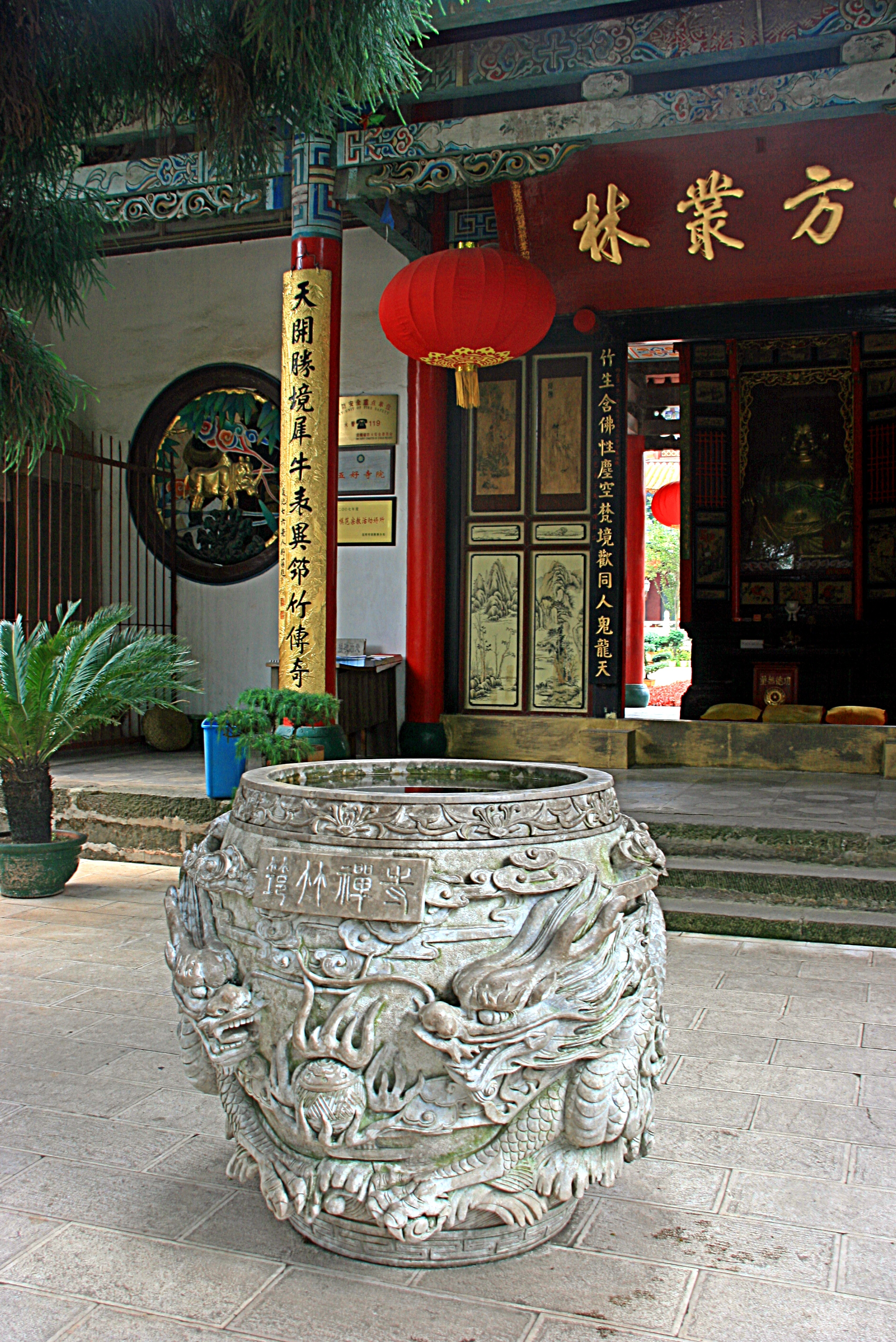
Courtyard in the Qiongzhu Temple

Qiongzhu Temple, or Bamboo Temple (Chinese: 筇竹寺; pinyin: Qióngzhú Sì), is a Buddhist temple situated on Yu'an Mountain (Chinese: 玉案山; pinyin: Yù'àn Shān) to the northwest of Kunming, Yunnan, China. The name of the temple (Qiongzhu) refers to a type of bamboo (genus Qiongzhuea). The Bamboo Temple was established during the Yuan dynasty as the first temple dedicated to Zen Buddhism in Yunnan. It has since been burned down and reconstructed several times. The present structure mostly dates from the late Qing dynasty.

== Artwork ==
The temple is most renowned for the painted clay sculptures of the 500 Buddhist arhats (Chinese: 五百罗汉; pinyin: Wǔbǎi Luōhàn). The sculptures which are known as the "sculptured pearls in the oriental treasure-house" were created during the reign of the Guangxu Emperor (r. 1875–1908) in the Qing dynasty, when the temple was undergoing major repairs. Li Guangxiu (Chinese: 黎广修; pinyin: Lí Guǎngxiū), a folk clay artist from Sichuan Province, took his students to Kunming where they spent seven years (1883–1890) to create the sculptures.

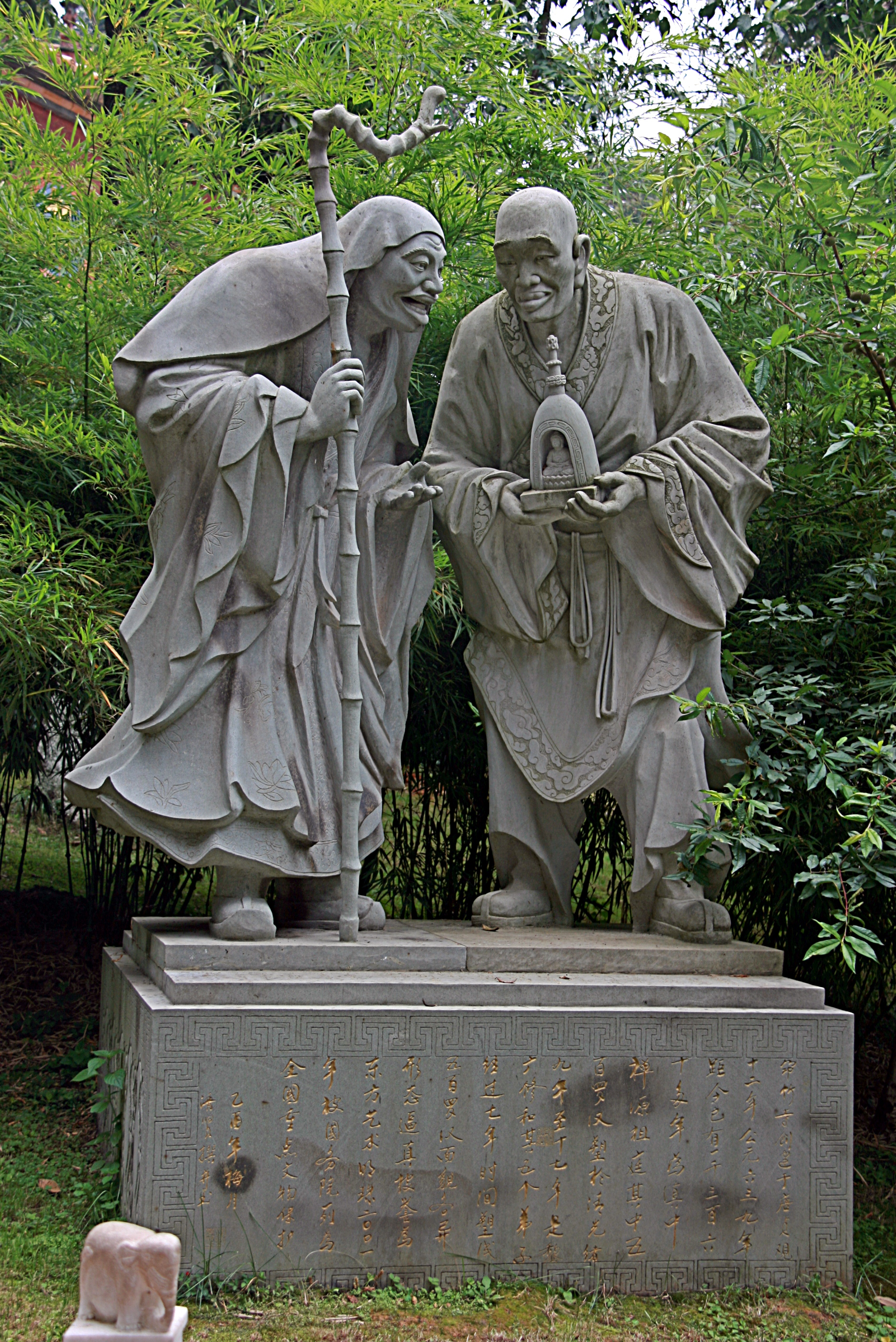
Replicas of 2 arhat sculptures in front of the temple

The arhat sculptures are distributed over three buildings: 216 each are in the Fanyin Pavilion and the Tiantailai Pavilion, 68 are housed in the temple's main hall, the Daxiong Hall. In the Fanyin Pavilion and the Tiantailai Pavilions, the arhat sculptures stand beside a central Buddha sculpture in six rows, with three levels in each row. Each arhat is about one meter tall and is characterized by unique facial expressions and body gesture. This is a radical break from the usual fixed style of Buddhist sculptures. Through the use of exaggeration, the artists created lively images. Some arhats are reaching for the Moon with extremely long arms, some are crossing the ocean on extra-long legs. There are bare-footed monks and naked-bellied Buddhas. Some are lost in deep thought, some are telling each other good news. Some are tranquil, some angry, some surprised, some curious. One is scratching his back, another is poking his ear.

Besides the arhats, the temple also houses a collection of antithetical couplets from authors that range from the famous poet monk, Dandang of the late Ming dynasty, to the general Li Genyuan (1879–1965).
