= Nengren Temple (Jiujiang) =

Buddhist temple in Jiangxi, China

- 能仁寺
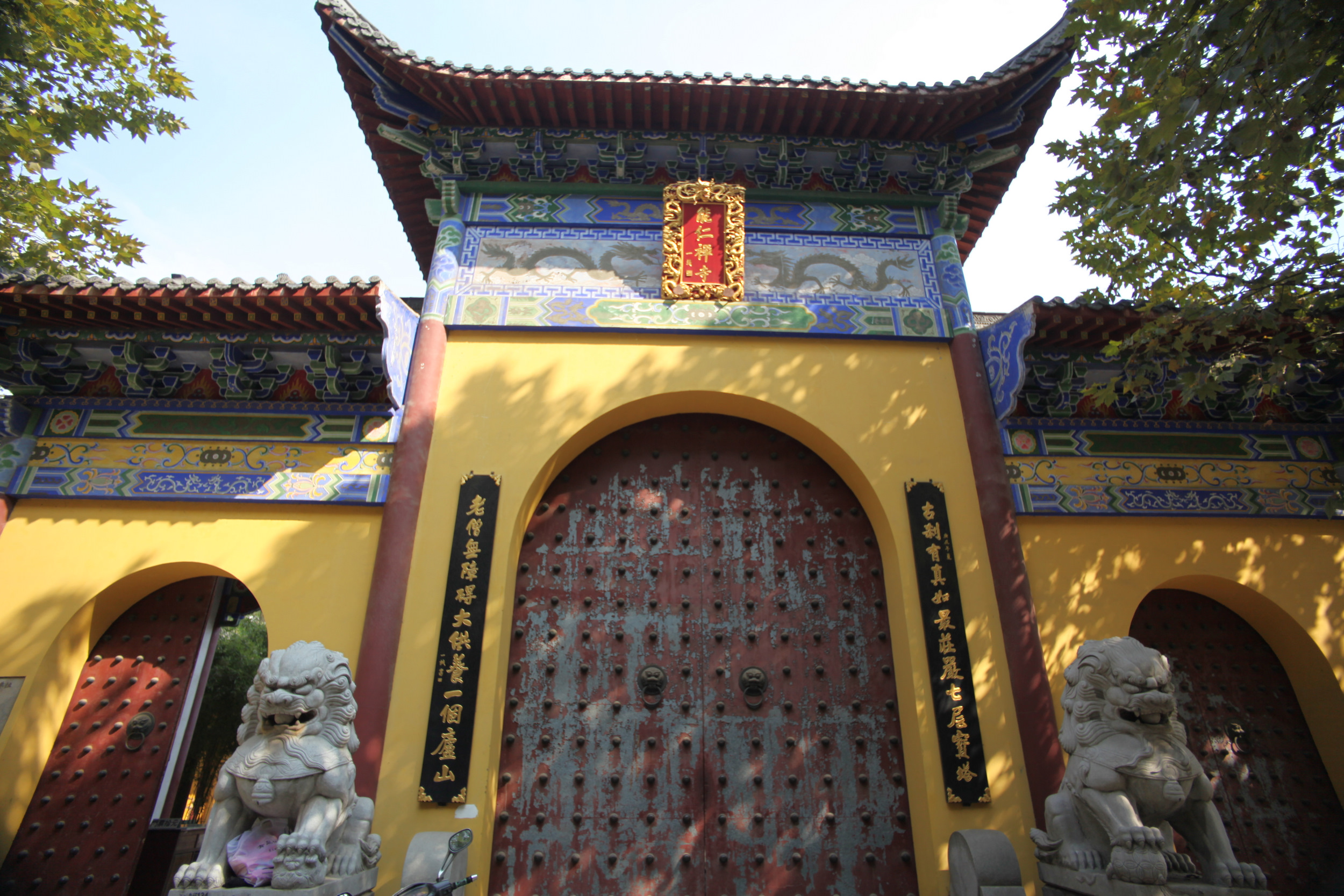
- The shanmen at Nengren Temple.

- Location within China

Religion
- Affiliation: Buddhism
- Sect: Chan Buddhism
- Leadership: Shi Puyu (释普钰)

Location
- Location: Xunyang District, Jiujiang, Jiangxi
- Country: China
- Interactive map of Nengren Temple
- Coordinates: 29°17′30″N 116°24′38″E

Architecture
- Style: Chinese architecture
- Established: 502–549
- Completed: 1870 (reconstruction)

Nengren Temple (Chinese: 能仁寺; pinyin: Néngrén Sì) is a Buddhist temple located in Xunyang District of Jiujiang, Jiangxi, China. Nengren Temple is one of the "Three Buddhist Temples of Jiujiang". It has been authorized as a National Key Buddhist Temple in Han Chinese Area by the State Council of China in 1983. Nengren Temple was first built in the Northern and Southern dynasties (420–589), and went through many changes and repairs through the following dynasties. The modern temple was founded in 1870 in the Tongzhi period of the Qing dynasty (1644–1911).

== History ==
=== Liang and Tang dynasties ===
Nengren Temple was first built between 502 and 549 during the reign of Emperor Wu of Liang of Liang dynasty (502–557), rebuilt in the Dali period (766–779) of Tang dynasty, and initially called "Chengtian Temple" (承天院).

=== Song dynasty ===
The temple had reached unprecedented heyday in the reign of Emperor Renzong (1041–1048) of the Northern Song dynasty (960–1127), while monk Baiyunduan (白云端) resided in the temple chanting and practicing scriptures, and attracted large numbers of practitioners.

=== Yuan dynasty ===
In 1352, in the 12th year of Zhizheng period (1341–1370) in the Yuan dynasty (1271–1368), the temple was completely destroyed by war.

=== Ming dynasty ===
In 1379, at the dawn of Ming dynasty (1368–1644), the local government rebuilt the temple. In 1498, in the second year of Hongzhi era, the temple was renamed "Nengren Temple". In 1573 during the reign of Wanli Emperor, the Buddhist Texts Library was added to the temple.

=== Qing dynasty ===
In the Qianlong period (1736–1796) of the Qing dynasty (1644–1911), the emperor bestowed a set of Tripitakas on the temple. During the Xianfeng period (1851–1861), it became deserted and restored in the Tongzhi period (1862–1874).

=== People's Republic of China ===
In July 1957, the Jiangxi People's Provincial Government classified the temple as a provincial-level key cultural heritage.

In 1983, Nengren Temple was designated as a National Key Buddhist Temple in Han Chinese Area by the State Council of China.

== Architecture ==
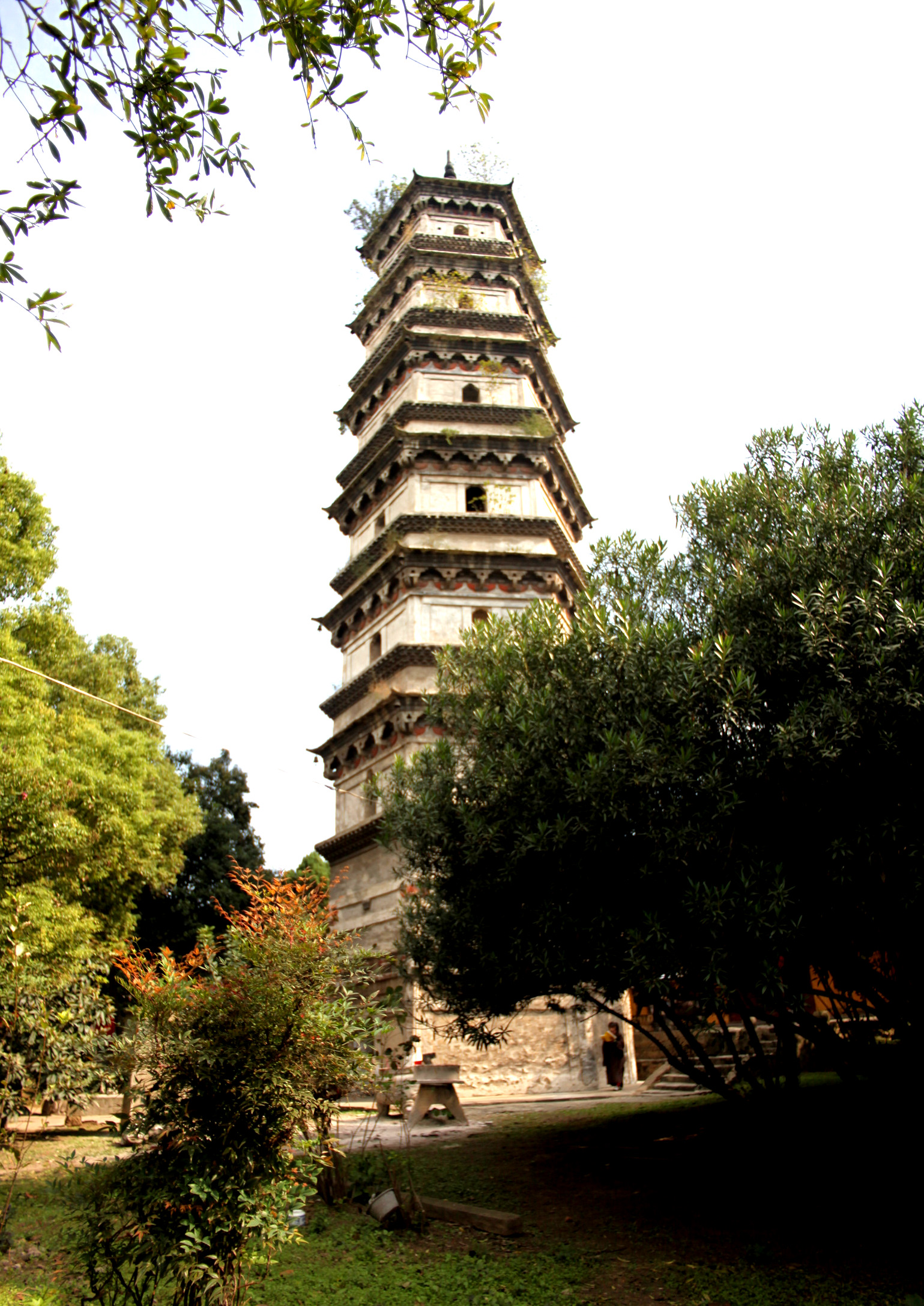
The Dasheng Pagoda at Nengren Temple.

Nengren Temple is built along the up and down of mountains and divided into the front, middle and end routes. The central axis of the complex are the Shanmen, Shuangyang Bridge, Mahavira Hall, Iron Buddha Hall, and Buddhist Texts Library.

=== Mahavira Hall ===
The Mahavira Hall is the main hall of Nengren Temple enshrining Sakyamuni. Statues of Kassapa and Ananda are placed on the left and right sides of his statue. The statues of Eighteen Arhats stand on both sides of the hall.

=== Dasheng Pagoda ===
The Dasheng Pagoda (大胜塔) was first built in 766 and rebuilt in 1379. The seven-story, 42.26-metre-tall (138.6 ft), hexagonal-based Chinese pagoda is made of brick and stone.

=== Stone Boat ===
The Stone Boat (石船) was made in 1406 in the Qingli period of Northern Song dynasty (960–1127). It is 5 metres (16 ft) long, 1 metre (3 ft 3 in) wide, and 6 metres (20 ft) deep. During the Yuanyou period (1086–1094), an iron Buddha (铁佛) was cast and placed on the boat. Legend says that in the Northern Song dynasty a monk dreamed about an iron Buddha ferrying across the river in a stone boat. In the Cultural Revolution, the Iron Buddha was demolished by the Red Guards.

=== Shuangyang Bridge ===
The marble three-arch Shuangyang Bridge (双阳桥; 'Twin Sun Bridge') was built in the Yuanyou period (1086–1094) of the Northern Song dynasty (960–1127), its banisters were engraved patterns of various flying phoenixes, lotuses, Hercules, monsters, etc.
