= Qifo Temple =

Buddhist temple in Xinzhou, China

- 七佛寺
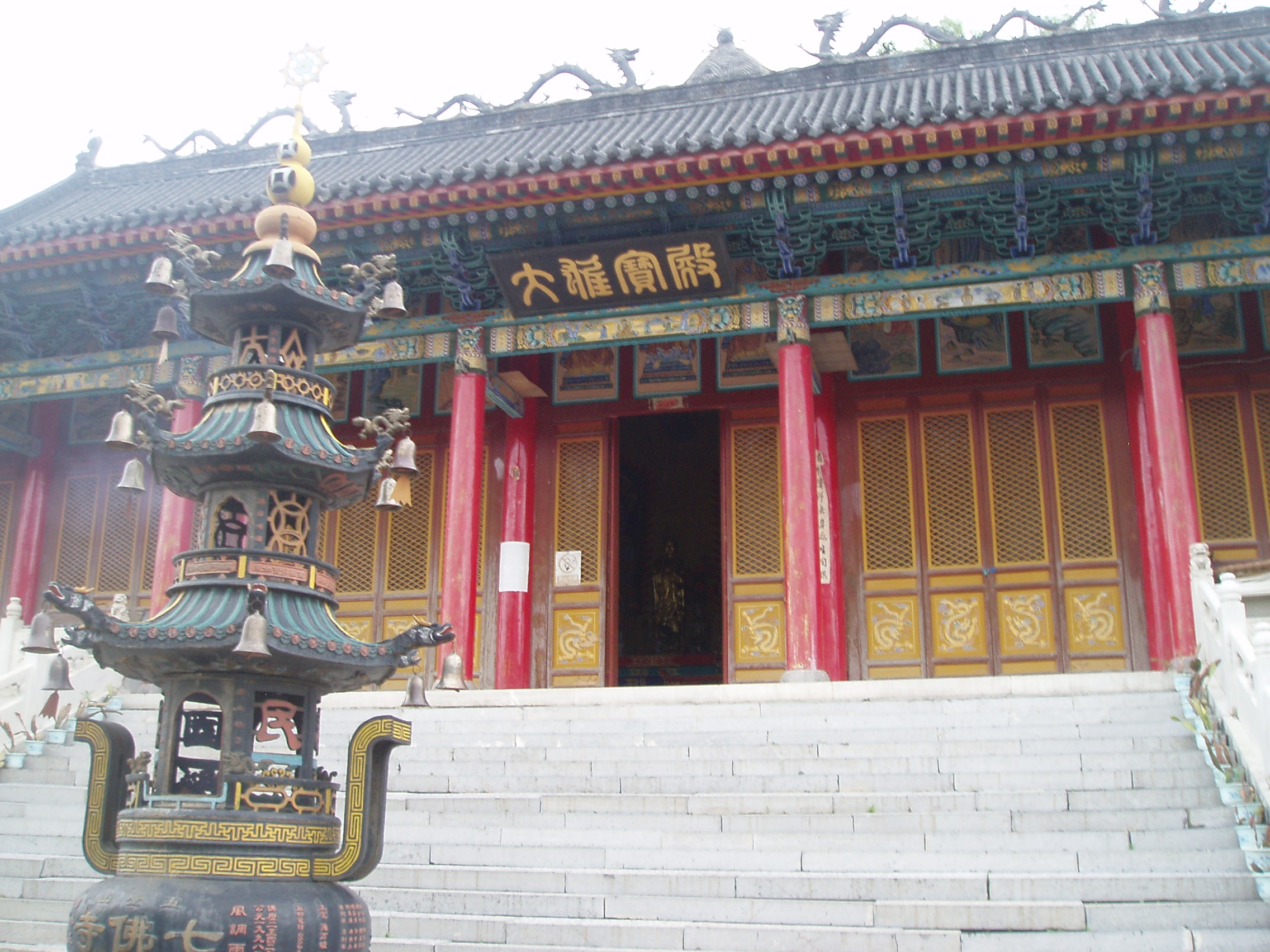
- The Mahavira Hall at Qifo Temple.

- Location within Shanxi

Religion
- Affiliation: Buddhism
- Prefecture: Wutai County
- Province: Shanxi
- Deity: Tibetan Buddhism

Location
- Country: China
- Prefecture: Wutai County
- Coordinates: 39°01′23″N 113°36′24″E

Architecture
- Style: Chinese architecture
- Established: Northern Song (960-1127)

Qifo Temple (Chinese: 七佛寺; pinyin: Qīfó Sì) is a Buddhist temple located in Taihuai Town of Wutai County, Xinzhou, Shanxi, China.

== History ==
The Qifo temple was first construction in the Northern Song (960-1127), rebuilt in 1466 in the Chenghua period (1447-1487) and 1734 in the Yongzheng period (1678-1735). In 1734, the temple converted to Tibetan Buddhism.

Qifo Temple was completely destroyed in the Cultural Revolution. In 1991, monk Zhengti (正提) and Bentong (本通) started to rebuild the temple. Mahavira Hall, Hall of Four Heavenly Kings, Qifo Hall, Three Saints Hall, Hall of Guru, Hall of Manjushri, and Buddhist Texts Hall were added to the temple successively.

== Architecture ==
=== Qifo Hall ===
The Qifo Hall (七佛殿) enshrining seven jade statues of Buddha from Myanmar. The hall in the west side of the temple.

=== Three Saints Hall ===
The Three Saints Hall (三圣殿) in the east side of Qifo Temple. The hall enshrining the Three Saints of Hua-yan (华严三圣). In the middle is Sakyamuni, statues of Manjushri and Samantabhadra stand on the left and right sides of Sakyamuni's statue.

=== Hall of Guru ===
The Hall of Guru in the south of the temple enshrining the statues of Buddha.

=== Qifo Tower ===
The Qifo Tower (七佛塔) is 22 metres (72 ft) high and built of white marble. It is the highest white marble tower in Mount Wutai. The tower was hexagonal with seven stories. It is composed of a pagoda base, a sumeru throne and a dense-eave body. The base was engraved patterns of lotuses, flowers and grasses. Each story has a nich with small statues of Buddha are carved on the body of the tower, from top to bottom, they are statues of Vipassī Buddha, Sikhī Buddha, Vessabhū Buddha, Krakucchanda, Koṇāgamana Buddha, Kassapa Buddha and Sakyamuni.

== National treasure ==
A bell cast in 1466 in the 2nd year of Chenghua period of Ming dynasty (1368-1644) is collect in the temple.

== Gallery ==
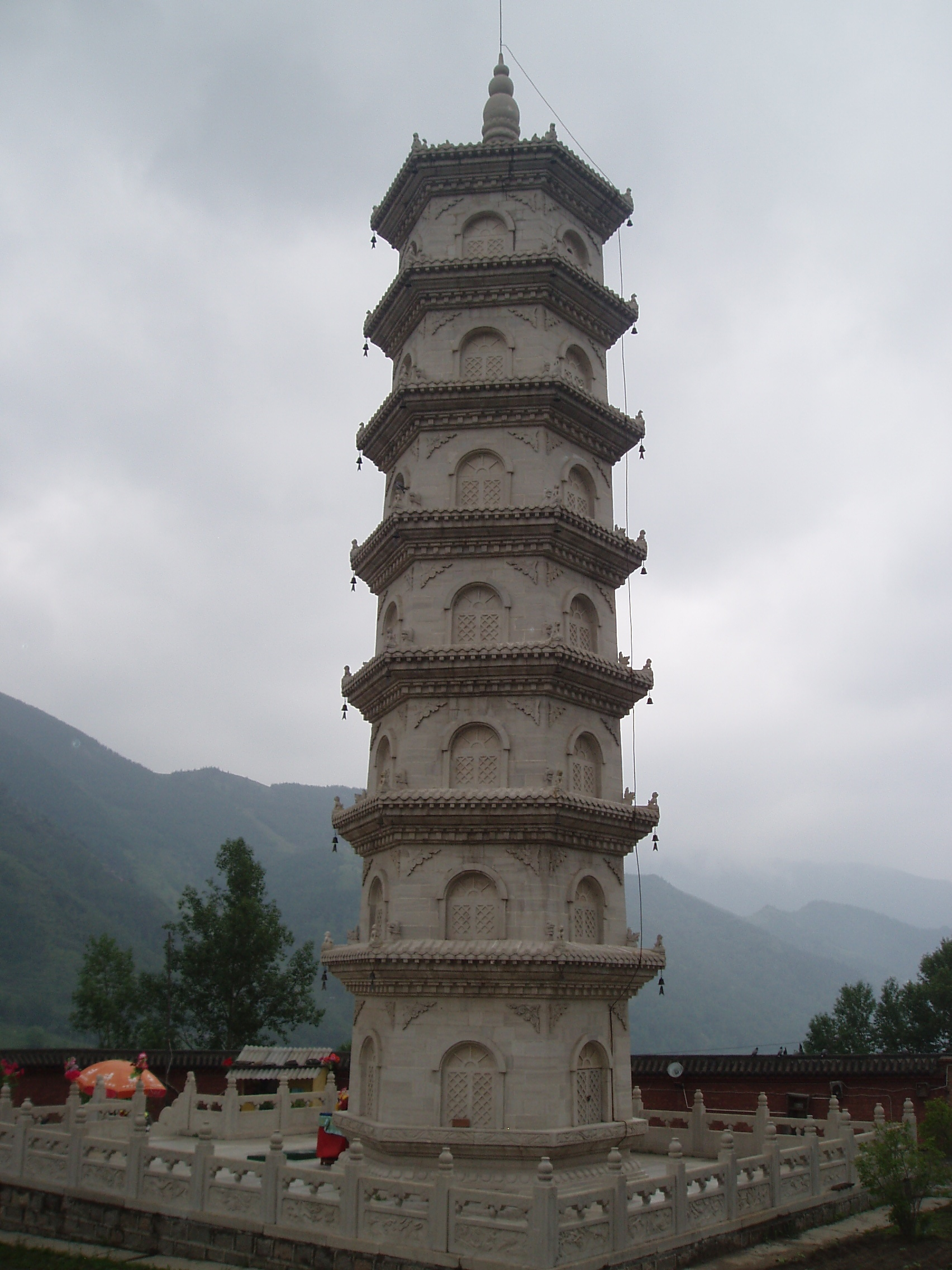
The Qifo Tower at the temple.

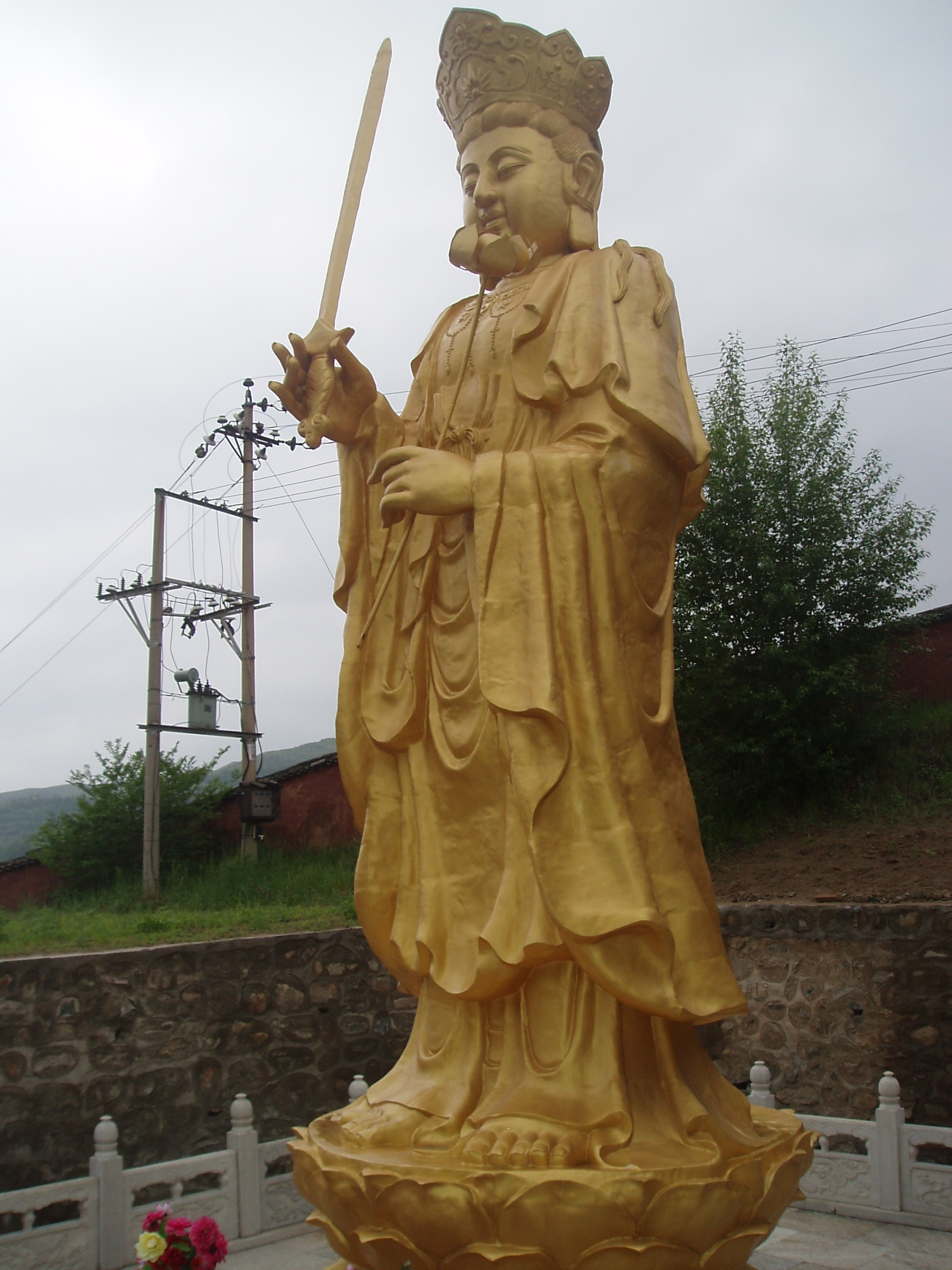
A giant statue at Qifo Temple.

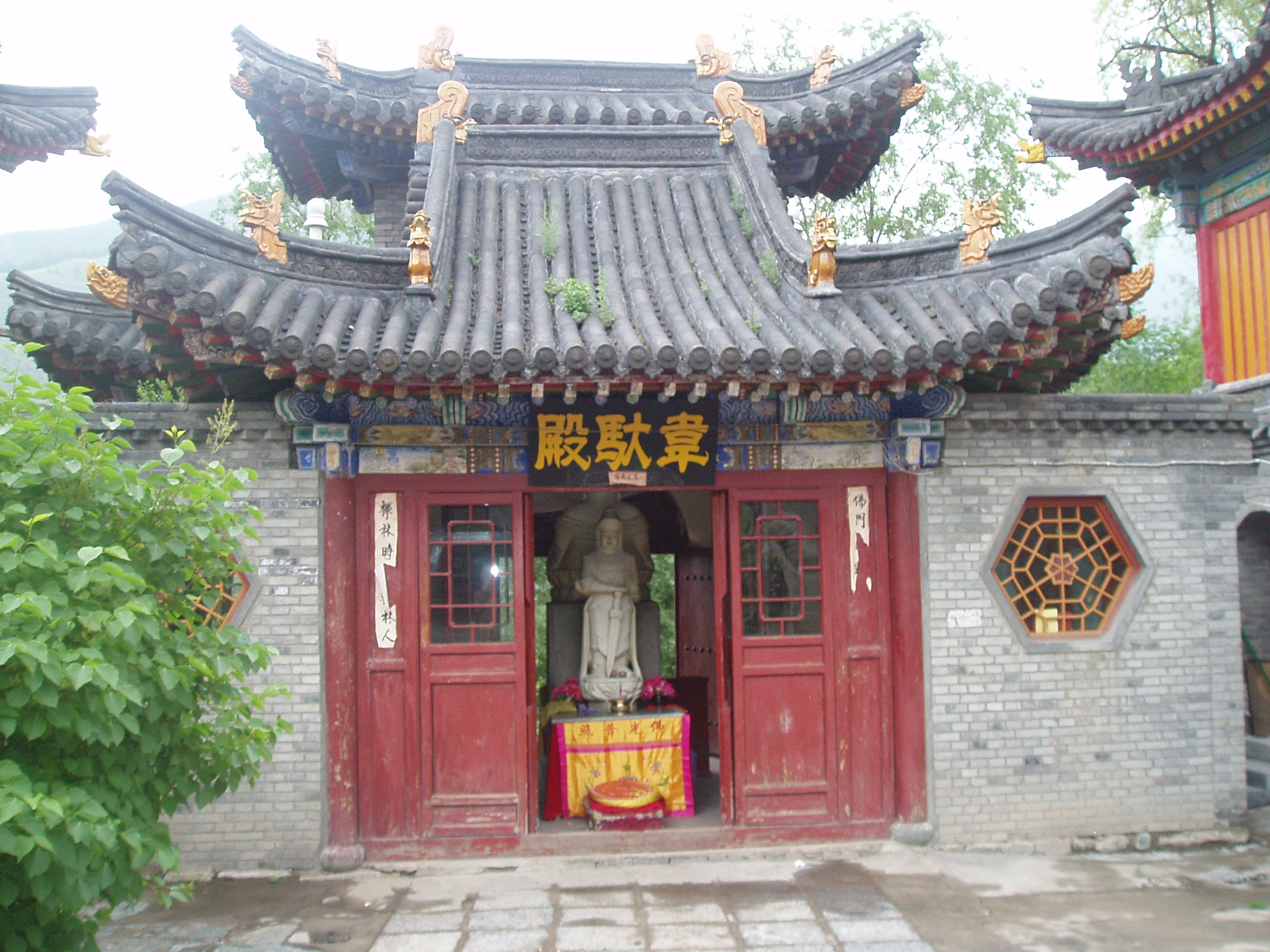
The Hall of Skanda.
