= Xingguo Temple (Binzhou) =

Buddhist temple in Binzhou, Shandong, China

- 兴国寺
- Location within Shandong

Religion
- Affiliation: Buddhism

Location
- Location: Hubin Town, Binzhou, Shandong
- Country: China
- Coordinates: 37°05′55″N 118°14′20″E

Architecture
- Style: Chinese architecture
- Established: c. 534
- Completed: 1998 (reconstruction)

Xingguo Temple (simplified Chinese: 兴国寺; traditional Chinese: 興國寺; pinyin: Xīngguó Sì), more commonly known as Zhangbafo (Chinese: 丈八佛; pinyin: Zhàngbāfó), is a Buddhist temple located in Hubin Town, Binzhou, Shandong, China.

== History ==
Xingguo Temple was first built around 534, under the Eastern Jin dynasty (266–420). Over the course of 1,470 years, the temple was destroyed and rebuilt many times, due to wars and natural disasters. The temple was gradually fell into ruin in the late Qing dynasty (1644–1911).

In 1992, the 5.6-metre (18 ft) high Statue of Buddha (丈八佛) has been the focus of the Shandong Provincial Government as a provincial cultural heritage conservation unit.

In 1998, Ou Tongguo (欧通国), the CEO of Shenzhen ITAT Group, appropriated a large sum of money for reconstructing the temple. Four Heavenly Kings Hall, Mahavira Hall, Hall of Zhangbafo, wing-rooms were added to the temple.

In the middle of 2004, Shi Changgu (释常固) was proposed as the new abbot of the temple. He raised funds to establish the Dining Hall, Meditation Hall, Reception Hall and other halls.

== Architecture ==
=== 5.6-metre (18 ft) high Statue of Buddha ===
The 5.6-metre (18 ft) high Statue of Buddha was carved around 534, in the 1st year of Tianping period of the Eastern Jin dynasty (266–420). It is 7.1-metre (23 ft) high in total.

Sitting on the lotus throne peacefully, the plump Buddha wears a Kasaya. The lotus throne is 1.55-metre (5 ft 1 in) high and weights 19-kilogram (42 lb). It was engraved patterns of various Hercules, Hill censer (Boshanlu), Garuda and 24 human figures.
