= Linyang Temple =

Buddhist temple in Fuzhou, Fujian, China

- 林阳寺
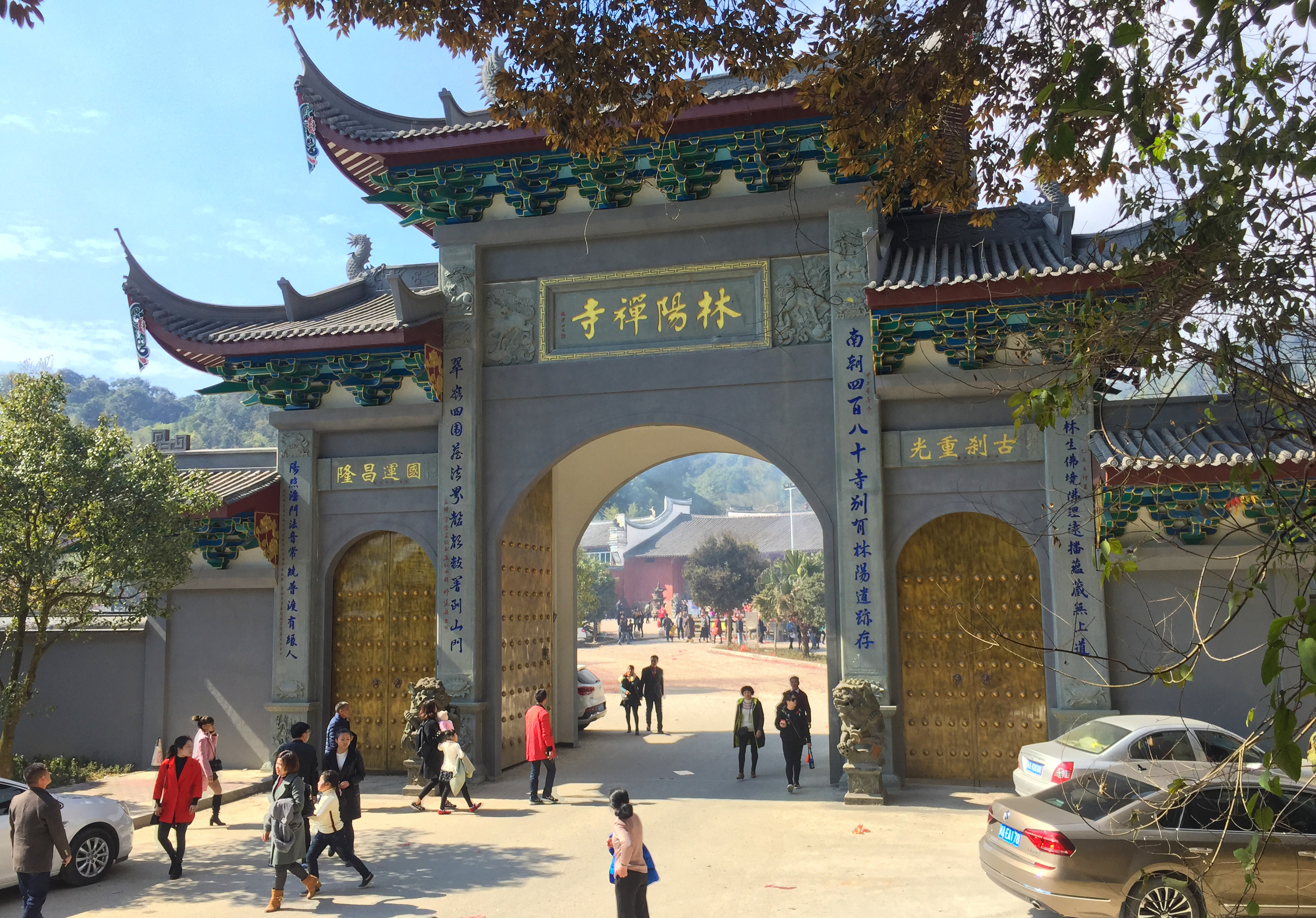
- The Shanmen at Linyang Temple

- Location within Fujian

Religion
- Affiliation: Buddhism
- Sect: Chan Buddhism
- Leadership: Shi Xiuda (释修达)

Location
- Location: Jin'an District, Fuzhou, Fujian
- Country: China
- Coordinates: 26°13′05″N 119°19′41″E

Architecture
- Style: Chinese architecture
- Founder: Zhiduan (志端)
- Established: 931 or 936
- Completed: 1612 (reconstruction)

Linyang Temple (simplified Chinese: 林阳寺; traditional Chinese: 林陽寺; pinyin: Línyáng Sì) is a Buddhist temple located in the Jin'an District of Fuzhou, Fujian.

== History ==
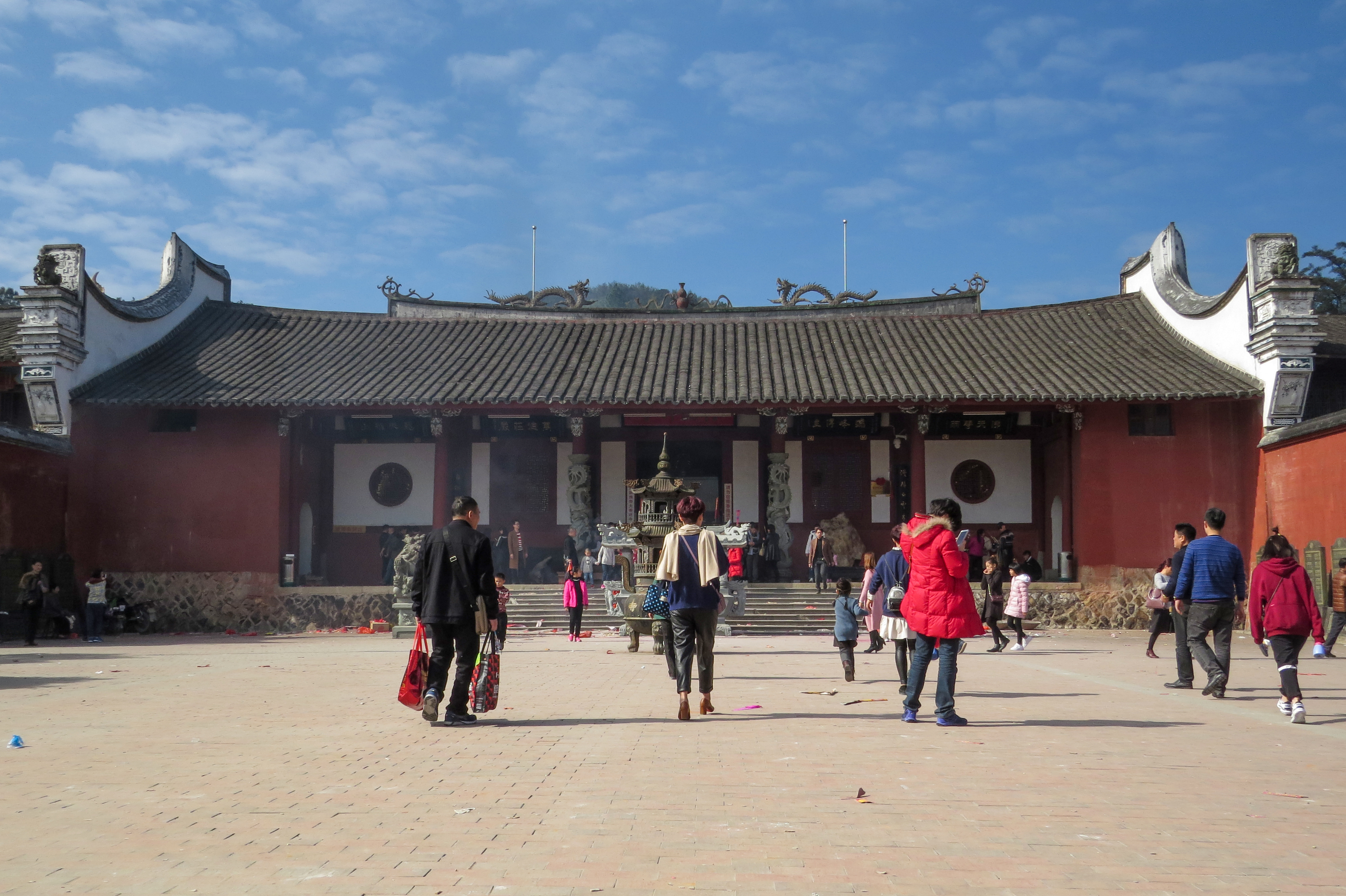
Linyang Temple

According to Three Mountains Annals (三山志), the temple was first built in 931 with the name of Linyang-yuan (林阳院; 'Linyang Temple'), in the reign of Emperor Mingzong (926–933) of the Later Tang (923–937). But the Mindu-ji (闽都记; 'Record of Fujian') says that the temple was originally built in 936, in the ruling of Shi Jingtang (936–942) in the Later Jin (Five Dynasties) (936–947).

Linyang Temple was restored and renovated in 1612, in the 40th year of Wanli period (1573–1620) in the late Ming dynasty (1368–1644). During the Guangxu era (1875–1908) of the late Qing dynasty (1644–1911), master Guyue (古月) raised funds to restore and redecorate the temple. In 1930, Yuan Ying was proposed as the new abbot of Linyang Temple.

After the 3rd plenary session of the 11th Central Committee of the Chinese Communist Party, according to the national policy of free religious belief, Linyang Temple was officially reopened to the public in 1981. The temple has been designated as a National Key Buddhist Temple in Han Chinese Area by the State Council of China in 1983.

== Architecture ==
The complex include the following halls: Shanmen, Mahavira Hall, Hall of Four Heavenly Kings, Hall of Great Compassion, Hall of Ksitigarbha, Bell tower, Drum tower, Hall of Guru, Dharma Hall, Dining Room, etc.
