= Baoshan Temple (Shanghai) =

Buddhist temple in Shanghai, China

Shanmen of the temple
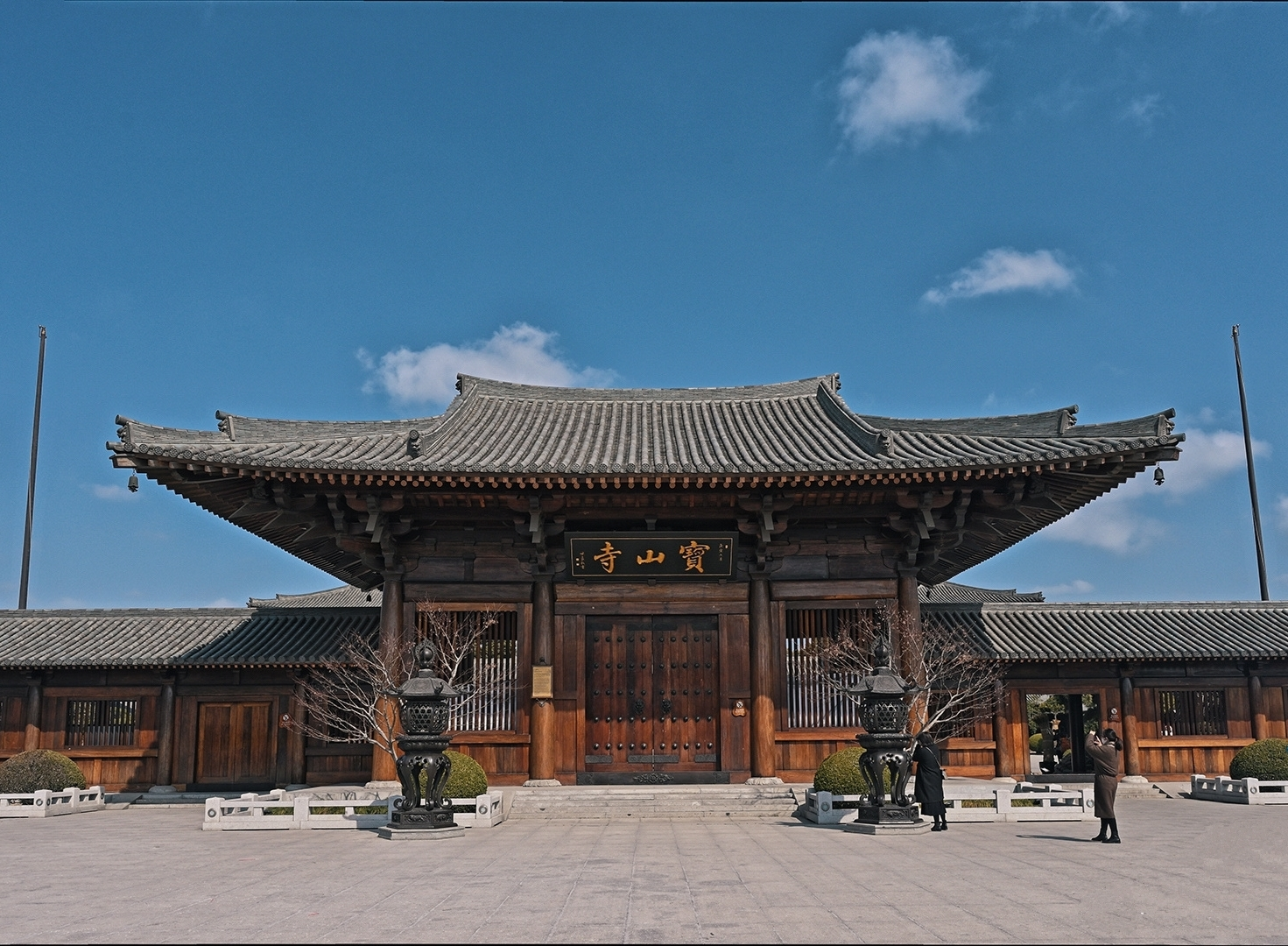
- The temple's shanmen

- Location in Baoshan District, Shanghai, China

Religion
- Affiliation: Buddhism

Location
- Location: No. 518 Luoxi Road, Luodian Town, Baoshan District, Shanghai.
- Country: China
- Interactive map of Shanmen of the temple
- Coordinates: 31.4170°N 121.3428°E

Baoshan Temple (Chinese: 寶山寺 or 寶山淨寺; pinyin: Bǎoshānsì or Bǎoshān Jìngsì; lit. 'Treasure Mountain Temple' or 'Treasure Mountain Serene Temple') is a Buddhist temple located on the banks of the Lianqi River in the town of Luodian, Baoshan District, Shanghai, China.

== History ==
The temple was first constructed during the reign of the Zhengde Emperor of the Ming Dynasty and was later restored in the 27th year of the Qianlong Emperor during the Qing Dynasty. Further construction and renovation has since taken place in 2005.

== Architectural layout ==
As of 2020, the temple has occupies a total area of 20 acres, making it the largest Buddhist temple in Shanghai. The large Mahavira Hall and the Hall of the Four Heavenly Kings still remain as they were originally built during the Ming dynasty. Of the newly constructed structures after the 2005 renovation, a traditional vertical axis layout was imposed and the buildings were built according to the architectural style of the late Tang Dynasty.

The total layout of the temple includes the Shanmen, the Mahavira Hall, the Hall of the Four Heavenly Kings, the Bell Tower, the Drum Tower, the Buddhist Texts Library, the Hall of the Guanyin, the Hall of Bhaisajyaguru, the Hall of Sangharama Palace, the Dharma Hall, and other structures.
