= Xifeng Temple =

Buddhist temple in Beijing, China

The Xifeng Temple (Chinese: 西峰寺) is a Buddhist temple in Beijing, China. Although established during the Tang dynasty, the present temple date to 1436 during the Ming dynasty.
