= Longshan Temple (Jinjiang) =

Buddhist temple in China

- 龙山寺
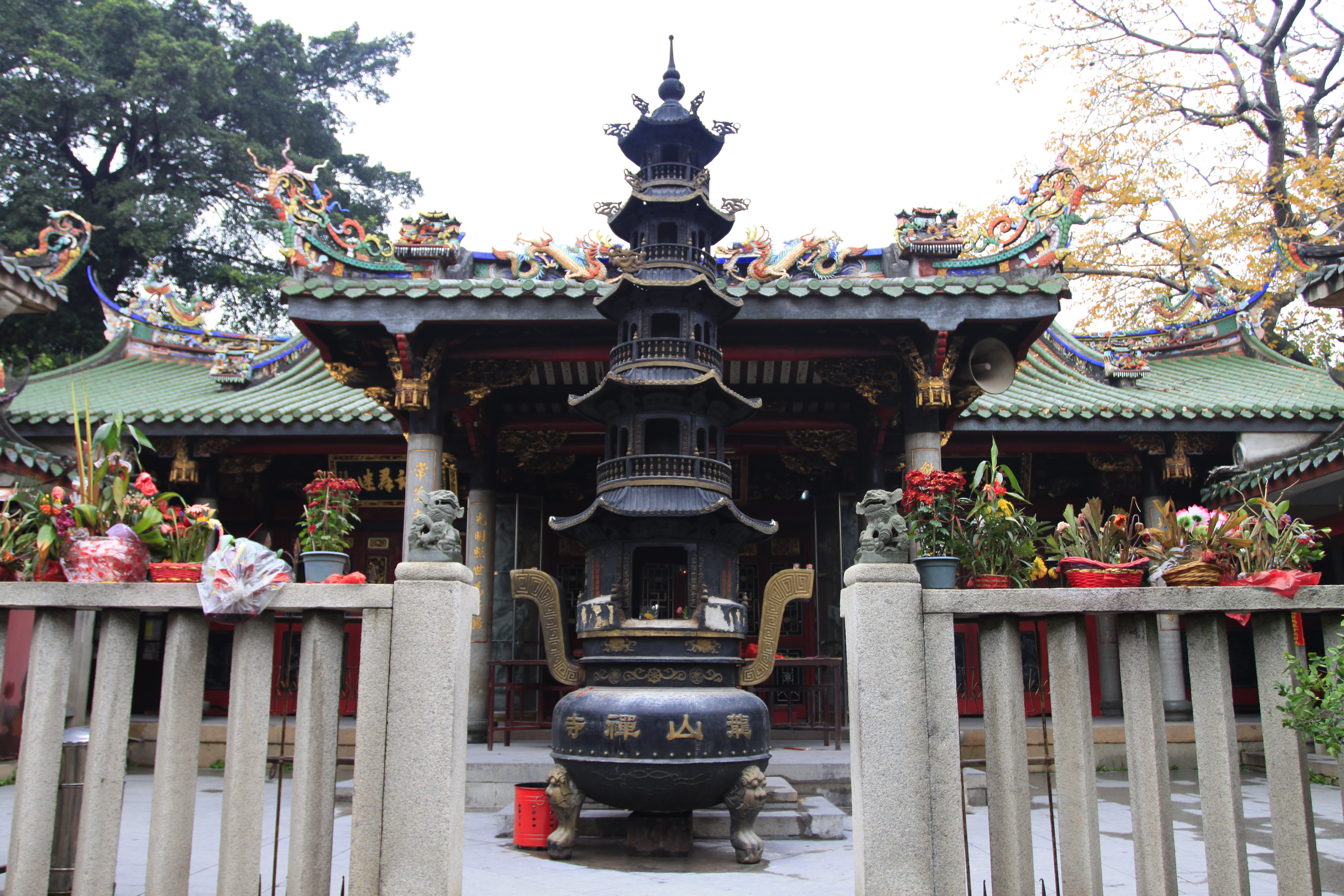
- A censer in front of a hall at Longshan Temple.

- Location within Fujian

Religion
- Affiliation: Buddhism
- Sect: Chan Buddhism

Location
- Location: Anhai Town, Jinjiang, Fujian
- Country: China
- Interactive map of Longshan Temple
- Coordinates: 24°43′43″N 118°28′23″E

Architecture
- Style: Chinese architecture
- Established: 618–619
- Completed: 1708 (reconstruction)

Longshan Temple (simplified Chinese: 龙山寺; traditional Chinese: 龍山寺; pinyin: Lóngshān Sì) is a Buddhist temple located on the foot of Mount Long (龙山; 'Dragon Mountain') in Anhai Town of Jinjiang, Fujian, China. The eldest thing in the temple is the statue of Thousand-armed and eyed Guanyin, which was supposed carved by ancient Indian monk Yilisha (一粒沙). It was transformed and expanded many times throughout Chinese history until now. There are dozens of which are built after the Ming dynasty (1368–1644). Longshan Temple is the ancestral temple of 400 Buddhist temples with the same name in Taiwan.

== History ==
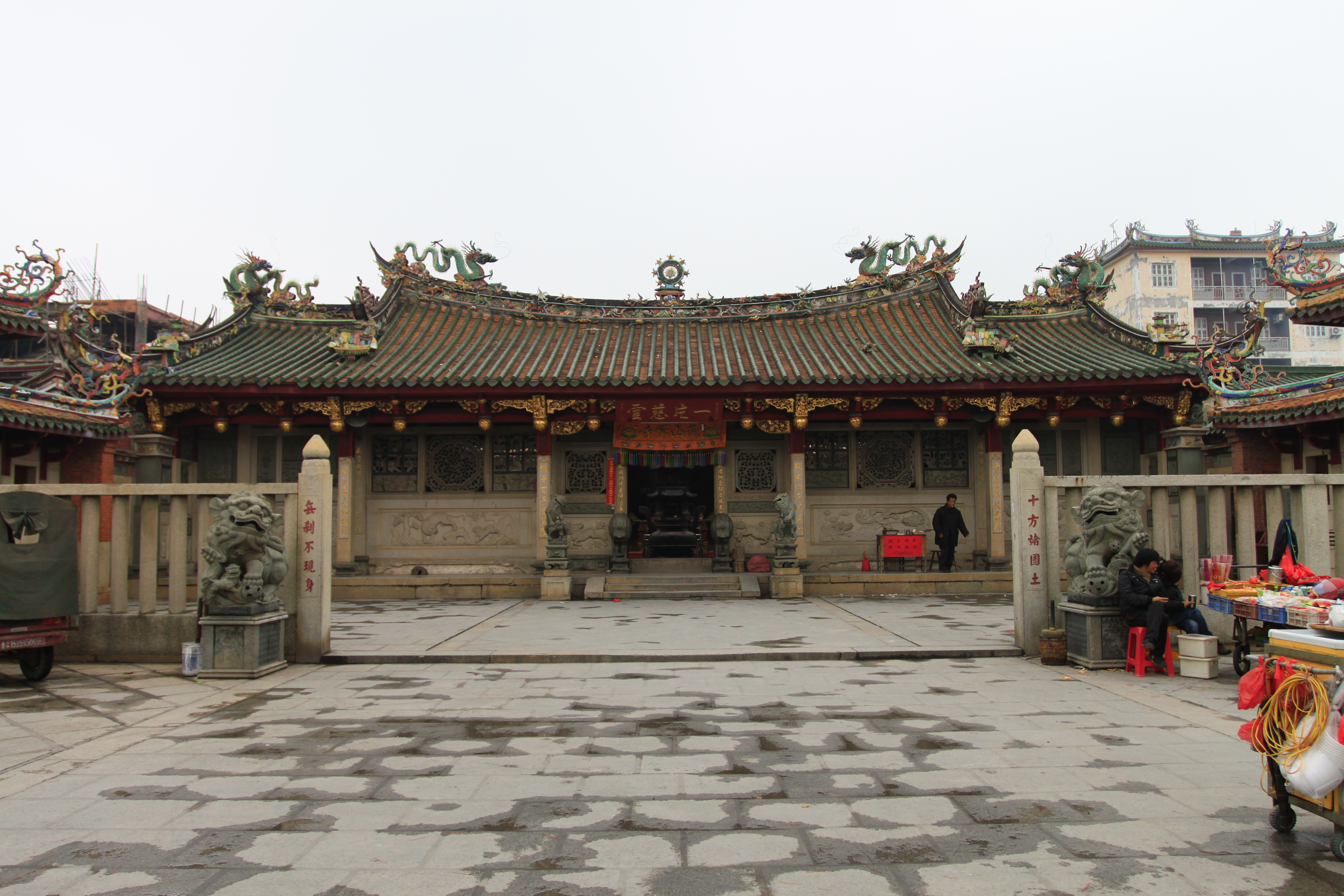
Longshan Temple.

=== Tang dynasty ===
Longshan Temple was originally built between 618 and 619, at the dawn of the Tang dynasty (618–907). It initially called "Puxian Temple" (普现寺) and "Tianzhu Temple" (天竺寺; 'Temple of Tianzhu (India)'), more commonly known as the "Guanyin Hall" (观音殿). According to the temple's founding legend, there was orininally a giant camphor tree in the area, which covered the ground with thick shade and glowed at night. During the Eastern Han dynasty, an eminent Indian monk named Yīlìshā (一粒沙) believed that it was sacred and ordered craftsmen to carve it into a statue of the Thousand-Armed Thousand-Eyed Guanyin (千手千眼觀音; Qiānshǒu Qiānyǎn Guānyīn) and enshrine it within the temple.

=== Ming dynasty ===
The temple underwent restoration in 1623, during the reign of Tianqi Emperor (1621–1627) in the late Ming dynasty (1368–1644).

=== Qing dynasty ===
In 1684, in the 23rd year of Kangxi period (1662–1722) in the Qing dynasty (1644–1911), Shi Lang appropriated a large sum of money for repairing existing temple structures as well as constructing new building on the temple grounds. The temple was further expanded in 1708.

=== People's Republic of China ===
Longshan Temple has been designated as a National Key Buddhist Temple in Han Chinese Area by the State Council of China in 1983.

In May 2013, Longshan Temple was listed among the seventh group of "Major National Historical and Cultural Sites in Fujian" by the State Council of China.

== Architecture ==
=== Yuantong Hall ===
The Yuantong Hall (圆通宝殿) is the main hall in the temple. It was first built in the Sui dynasty (589–618), and the front of the hall was later repaired in the late Qing dynasty. The hall is 11.8 metres (39 ft) high, five rooms wide, three rooms deep and covers an area of 483 square kilometres (186 sq mi). The hall has double-eave gable and hip roof. On each end of the main ridge is a giant glazed green Chinese dragon, which known as Chiwen in Chinese architecture. There is a pair of 10-meter stone pillars with dragon patterns carved on it. The two lively dragons face each other and seem to fight against each other. This hall also houses a plaque inscribed by the Ming dynasty calligrapgher Zhang Ruitu (張瑞圖).

This hall enshrines a Ming dynasty wood carving statue of the Thousand-Armed Thousand-Eyed Guanyin. It is 4.2 metres (14 ft) high with 1,008 arms on both sides of the body. The middle two hands are in closing palm posture and other hands are either posed to form mudras or hold various different Buddhist instruments, such as vajras, sutra scrolls and dharma seals. There are several small statues of Buddha on its head.

=== Mahavira Hall ===
The Mahavira Hall is constructed with a double-eave gable and hip roof. A gilded copper statue of Sakyamuni is enshrined in the middle of the hall.

=== Hall of Four Heavenly kings ===
The Hall of Four Heavenly kings is the frontal hall in the temple, for the worship of Four Heavenly kings, namely the eastern Dhṛtarāṣṭra, the southern Virūḍhaka, the western Virūpākṣa and the northern Vaiśravaṇa.

=== Bell Tower ===
The Bell Tower houses a hollow wooden drum, which was carved during the Sui dynasty (581-618).

== Television series ==
Longshan Temple was used for location filming of 2015 documentary Longshan Temple.
