= Xiangyan Temple =

Buddhist temple in Henan, China

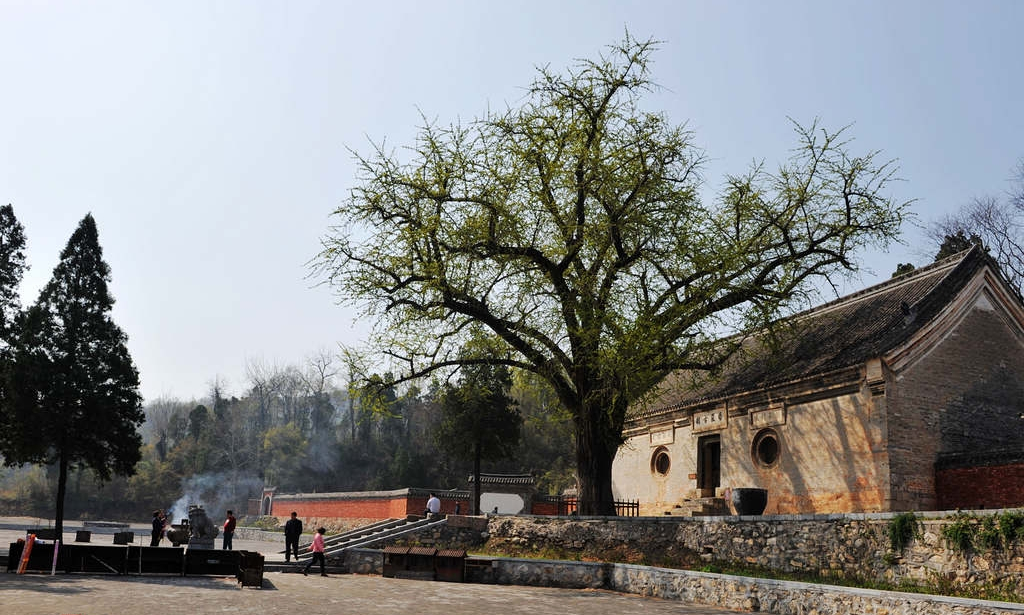
- The Xiangyan Temple

- Location in Henan

Religion
- Affiliation: Buddhism

Location
- Location: Xichuan County, Henan
- Country: China
- Coordinates: 32°46′50″N 111°26′04″E

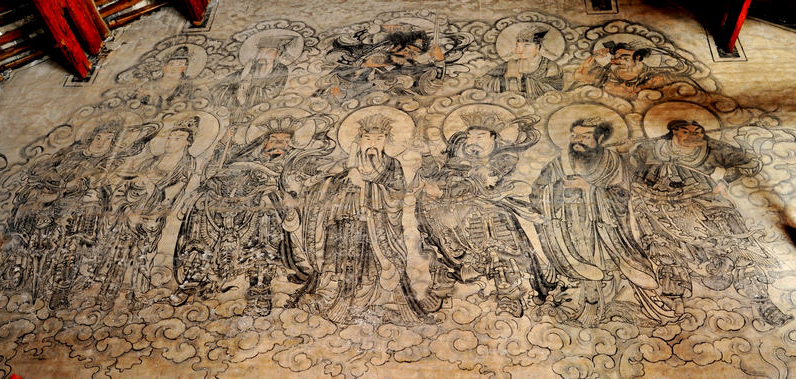
Mural inside the temple

Xiangyan Temple (simplified Chinese: 香严寺; traditional Chinese: 香嚴寺) is a famous Chinese Buddhist temple in Xichuan County in southeastern Henan province, People's Republic of China.

== History ==
The temple was first built in the year 767 by Nanyang Huizhong, the second year during Emperor Daizong's reign of the Tang dynasty period (618–907) and it was named "Changshou Temple" (simplified Chinese: 长寿寺; traditional Chinese: 長壽寺) then.
