= Badachu =

Urban park in Beijing, China

Coordinates: 39.9537°N 116.18°E

Badachu Park
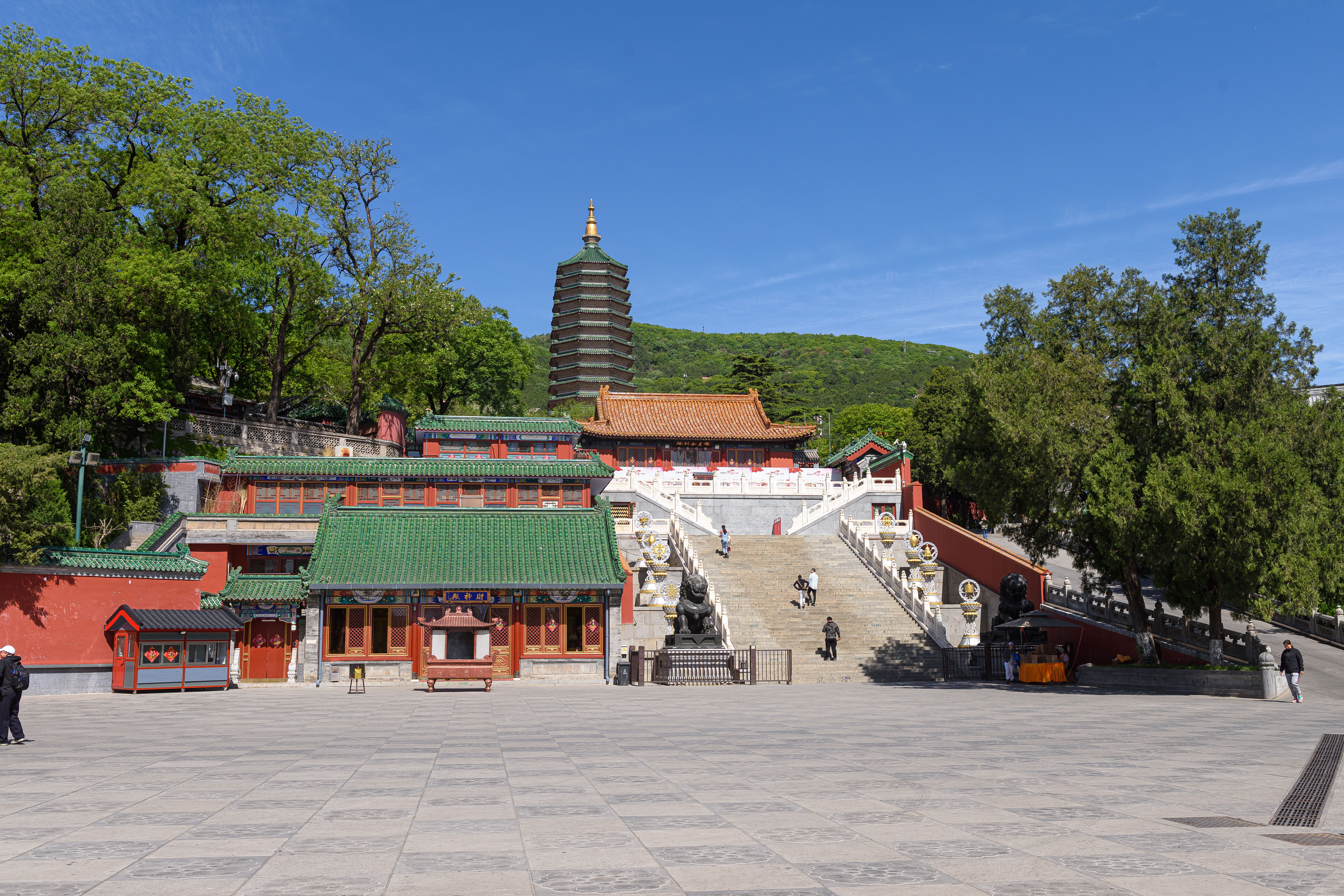
- Lingguang Temple in Badachu
- Interactive map of Badachu Park
- Type: Urban park
- Location: Beijing, China
- Area: 332 hectares (820 acres)
- Created: 7th century
- Status: Open all year

The Badachu (simplified Chinese: 八大处; traditional Chinese: 八大處; pinyin: bādàchǔ; also known as "Badachu Park") is a complex of monasteries located on the outskirts of urban Beijing, which means "Eight Great Sites" that refers to the eight Buddhist temples and nunneries scattered across the Cuiwei, Pingpo, and Lushi hills in Shijingshan District, at the foot of Beijing's Western Hills.

== Three Mountains ==
The north one is Hutou Mountain (虎头山); the south one is Qinglong Mountain (青龙山), and the middle one is Cuiwei Mountain (翠微山).

Cuiwei Mountain is also called Pingpo Mountain. It is the highest of the three mountains. It is the burial place of Princess Cuiwei. The mountain contains five temples: Sanshanan Nunnery, Dabei Temple, Longquan Nunnery, Xiangjie Temple, and Baozhu cave.

Hutou Mountain means the head of a tiger. In the historical record, Hutou Mountain is also called Mingjue Mountain (名觉山). The mountain has two temples, Changan Temple and Lingguang Temple.

Qinglong Mountain means green dragon. The east part of it is also called Lushi Mountain. According to legend, at the end of the Sui dynasty a monk named Lu Shi tamed two dragons and buried them in the mountain. The mountain also has the ruins of four more temples and a yard. The mountain has one of the Eight Temples, Zhengguo Temple.

== Gallery ==
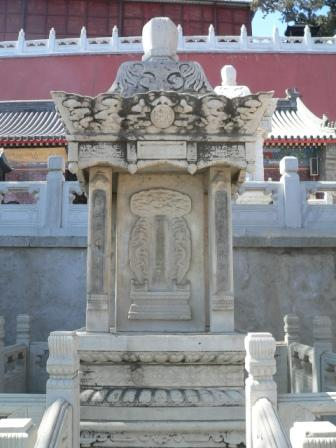
Treasure trunk pagoda at Lingguang Temple

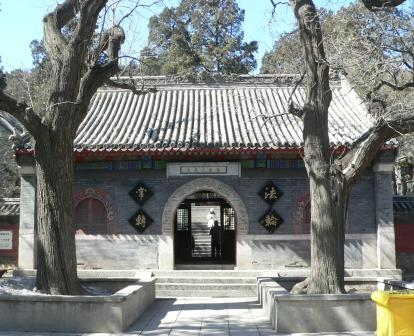
Entrance to the Dabei Temple

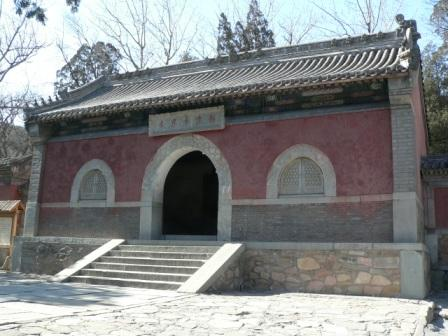
Entrance to the Xiangjie Temple

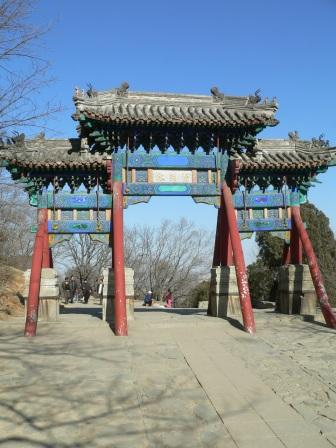
Paifang at the Baozhu Cave

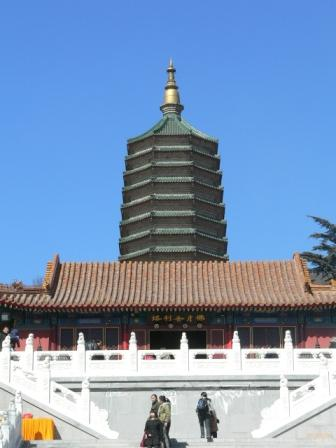
Lingguang Temple
