= Mingjiao Temple (Zhejiang) =

Buddhist temple

- 明教寺
- Location within Zhejiang

Religion
- Affiliation: Buddhism
- Deity: Chan Buddhism
- Leadership: Shi Jueyang (释觉扬)

Location
- Location: Mingjiao Village, Zhuji, Zhejiang
- Country: China
- Coordinates: 29°36′42″N 120°04′12″E

Architecture
- Style: Chinese architecture
- Established: 942
- Completed: 1866 (reconstruction)

Mingjiao Temple (Chinese: 明教寺; pinyin: Míngjiào Sì) is a Buddhist temple located in Mingjiao Village of Zhuji, Zhejiang, China.

== History ==
According to Zhuji County Annuals, the temple traces was first built in 942, in the 7th year of Tianfu period (936–941) in the Later Jin (Five Dynasties) (936–947), and would later become the "Tongjiao Temple" (通教寺) in the reign of Emperor Zhenzong (998–1022) in the Northern Song dynasty (960–1279). After Emperor Renzong's (1023–1063) accession to the throne, the name was changed into "Mingjiao Temple" (明教寺) to name after a famous Chan Master Mingjiao (明教禪師). The temple underwent two major renovations in the Qing dynasty (1644–1911), respectively in the ruling of Jiaqing Emperor (1818) and in the reign of Tongzhi Emperor (1866). In the 1980s, Shou Huating (寿花婷) and other Buddhist believers donated property to establish the Hall of Four Heavenly Kings and wing rooms. The temple was finally allowed to revive its religious activities in 1995.
