= Baoguang Temple =

Buddhist temple in Chengdu, China

Coordinates: 30.83367°N 104.15808°E

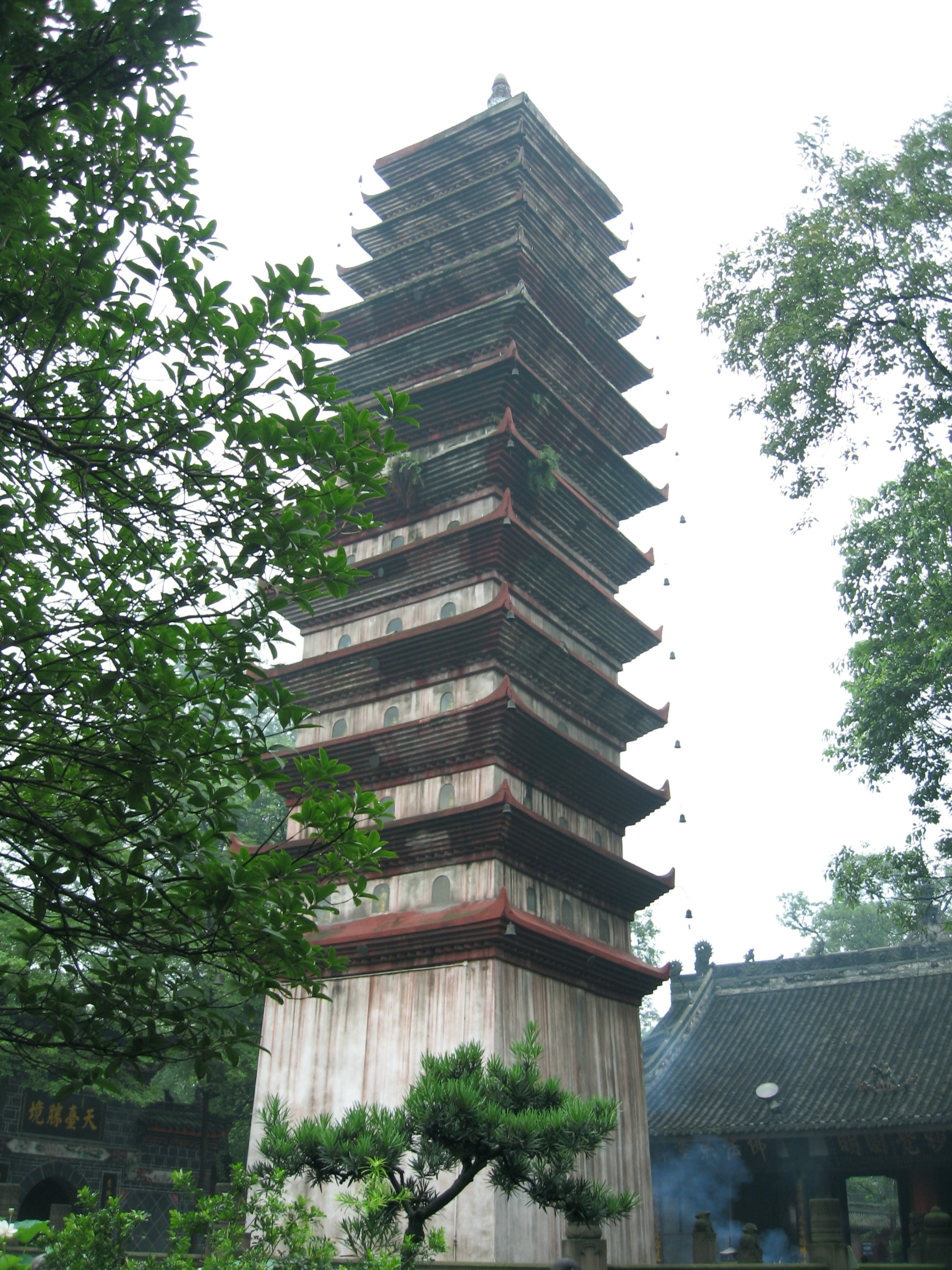
The Tang-dynasty pagoda of the Baoguang Temple

The Baoguang Temple (Chinese: 宝光寺; pinyin: Bǎogūang Sì) is located in Xindu district 18 km north of Chengdu, Sichuan province, China. It was founded during the Tang dynasty.

The temple is listed as an architecture of national heritage and major conservation. It is situated on a land of 100,000 square meters. There are more than 400 large stone pillars. The temple houses important cultural treasures, including:

- a Tang dynasty sharira stupa with a tilt;
- a Liang dynasty (502-587) jade Buddha and stone sharira stupa;
- a Shu-Han ritual bronze ding vessel from the Zhangwu era (220s);
- a Tang dynasty ceramic stupa;
- a copy of the Flower Adornment Sutra (Avatamsaka Sutra) dated back to the Yuan dynasty (1271-1368), with gold and silver pigments.

== Temple ==
The temple was first built during the Tang dynasty. It was burnt down during the Ming dynasty; and rebuilt after the Kangxi Emperor (1654-1722) reign in Qing dynasty. On August 16, 1956, the temple was listed as one of the first group of Sichuan Historical and Revolution Culture Heritage Conservation unit. On July 7, 1980, it was re-listed as one of Sichuan's Cultural Heritage Conservation Unit. On June 25, 2001, it was listed as a major National Cultural Heritage Conservation Unit.

The temples has a number of halls, including the Qing-era Arhat Hall (罗汉堂), containing 500 two-meter-high clay figurines of arhats, as well as statues of Ksitigarbha, Samantabhadra, Manjusri, the Thousand-armed Guanyin and the Wisdom King Mahamayuri. The temple also houses numerous treasures, including white jade Buddha from Burma and a stone tablet engraved with 1000 Buddhist figures.

== Pagoda ==
The Sharira Stupa (舍利塔), the temple's pagoda, is the only part of the temple that still dates from the Tang dynasty. It was built between 862 and 888. It is square, has thirteen floors, and is 30 meters tall. The inside of the pagoda is solid, so one cannot go inside. The first floor of the pagoda is quite tall compared to the upper floors. The upper floors all feature upturned eaves, with copper bells hanging from them. The top of the pagoda is gold-plated, and each of the four sides of every floor has an image of the Buddha inlaid in gold.

Shortly after the pagoda's construction in the Tang dynasty, the upper part of the pagoda partially collapsed. During the Ming dynasty, the upper part of the pagoda was restored, but the seventh floor and those above were built tilted slightly towards the west, not according to the pagodas original proportions. As a result, the pagoda has a noticeable tilt.

== See also ==
- List of leaning towers § China
