= Mingjiao Temple (Anhui) =

Buddhist temple in Hefei, China

- 明敎寺
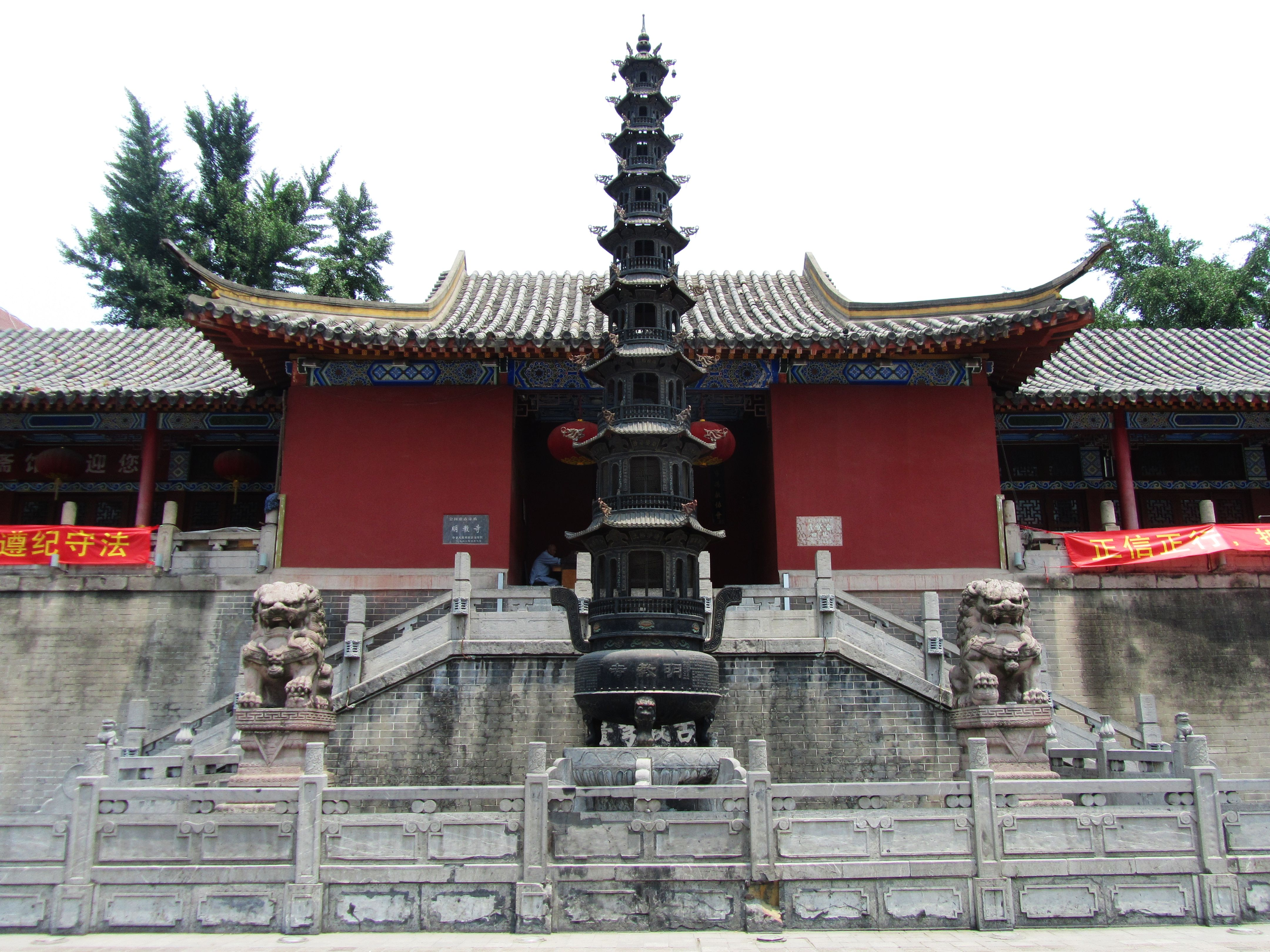
- The Shanmen at Mingjiao Temple.

Religion
- Affiliation: Buddhism
- Sect: Chan Buddhism - Linji school
- Deity: Five Tathagatas
- Leadership: Shi Miao'an (释妙安)

Location
- Location: Luyang District, Hefei, Anhui
- Country: China
- Interactive map of Mingjiao Temple
- Coordinates: 31°52′14″N 117°18′10″E

Architecture
- Style: Chinese architecture
- Established: 6th century
- Completed: 20th century (reconstruction)

Mingjiao Temple (Chinese: 明敎寺; pinyin: Míngjiào Sì), formerly known as Iron Buddha Temple (铁佛寺; 鐵佛寺), is a Buddhist temple located in the Luyang District of Hefei, Anhui, China. Mingjiao Temple was originally built in the early 6th century, but because of war and natural disasters has been rebuilt numerous times since then. The present version was renovated and redecorated in 2015.

== History ==
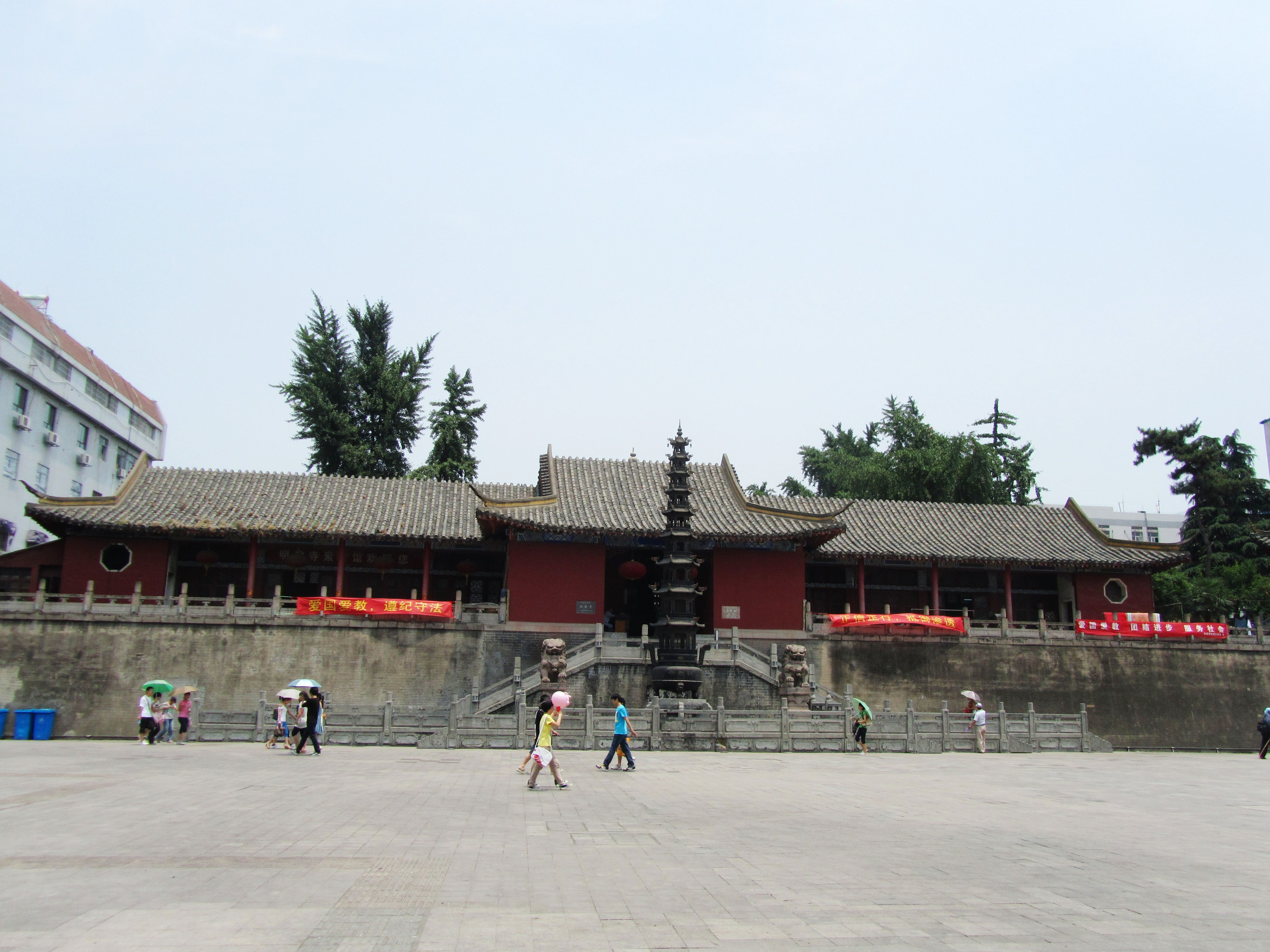
A frontal view of Mingjiao Temple in 2012.

The original temple dates back to the early 6th century during the Southern and Northern dynasties (420–589). After the fall of Sui dynasty (589–618), the temple was completely destroyed in war.

=== Tang dynasty ===
During the reign of Emperor Daizong (763–779) in the Tang dynasty (618–907), local people dug out an iron statue of Buddha in the ruins. Pei Xiu (791–864), the then provincial governor of Luzhou, reported the circumstance to the central government, the emperor issued the decree rebuilding the temple on the original site.

=== Ming dynasty ===
The name was changed into "Mingjiao Temple" in the Ming dynasty (1368–1644), which is still in use now.

=== Qing dynasty ===
In 1853, in the ruling of Xianfeng Emperor (1851–1861) in the Qing dynasty (1644–1911), Mingjiao Temple was again devastated by war and rebuilt in 1870, during the Tongzhi era (1862–1874). After the perdition of Taiping Heavenly Kingdom (1851–1864), the former general Yuan Hongmo (袁宏谟) lived in seclusion at the temple and named "Tongyuan" (通圆). He restored the Mahavira Hall in 1886, under the rule of Guangxu period (1875–1908).

=== Republic of China ===
On July 7, 1937, after the Marco Polo Bridge Incident, the Second Sino-Japanese War broke out. In the winter of that same year, part of the halls and rooms in Mingjiao Temple was badly damaged by Japanese fighters. Two years later, Mingjiao Temple was occupied by the Imperial Japanese Army.

=== People's Republic of China ===
Mingjiao Temple has been designated as a National Key Buddhist Temple in Han Chinese Area by the State Council of China in 1983. The temple reactivated its religious activities and was opened for worship in the following year.

Mingjiao Temple has been rebuilt several times since 1949, most recently in 2015.

== Architecture ==
The existing main buildings include the Shanmen, Four Heavenly Kings Hall, Mahavira Hall, Hall of Ksitigarbha, Reception Hall, and other rooms.

=== Mahavira Hall ===
There is a plaque under the eaves with the Chinese characters written by the former Venerable Master of the Buddhist Association of China Zhao Puchu: "Mahavira Hall". The Hall enshrines the statues of Five Tathagatas, which all came from Beijing. The statues of Eighteen Arhats stand on both sides of the hall.
