= Zhiyuan Temple (Panjin) =

Buddhist temple in Panshan, Liaoning, China

- 祗园寺
- Location within Liaoning Location within China

Religion
- Affiliation: Buddhism

Location
- Location: Shaling Town, Panshan County, Liaoning
- Country: China
- Interactive map of Zhiyuan Temple
- Coordinates: 41°05′48″N 122°20′11″E

Architecture
- Style: Chinese architecture
- Established: 19th century
- Completed: August 1998 (reconstruction)

Zhiyuan Temple (simplified Chinese: 祗园寺; traditional Chinese: 祗園寺; pinyin: Zhīyuán Sì) is a Buddhist temple located in Shaling Town of Panshan County, Liaoning, China.

== History ==
Zhiyuan Temple was originally built in the 19th century, during the Guangxu period (1871–1908) of the Qing dynasty (1644–1911), but because of war and natural disasters has been rebuilt numerous times since then. The present version was completed in August 1998.

== Architecture ==
Zhiyuan Temple covers an area of 2,400 square metres (26,000 sq ft) and the total area including temple lands, forests and mountains is over 3,700 square metres (40,000 sq ft). The existing main buildings include the Shanmen, Four Heavenly Kings Hall, Drum Tower, Bell Tower, Mahavira Hall, Guru Hall, and Buddhist Texts Library.

=== Mahavira Hall ===
The Mahavira Hall enshrines three gilded copper statues of Three-Life Buddha, each statue is about 10 metres (33 ft) high. At the back of Sakyamuni's statue is the statue of Guanyin. The statues of Eighteen Arhats stand on both sides of the hall.
