= Xingguo Temple (Jinan) =

Buddhist temple in Jinan, Shandong, China

- 兴国寺
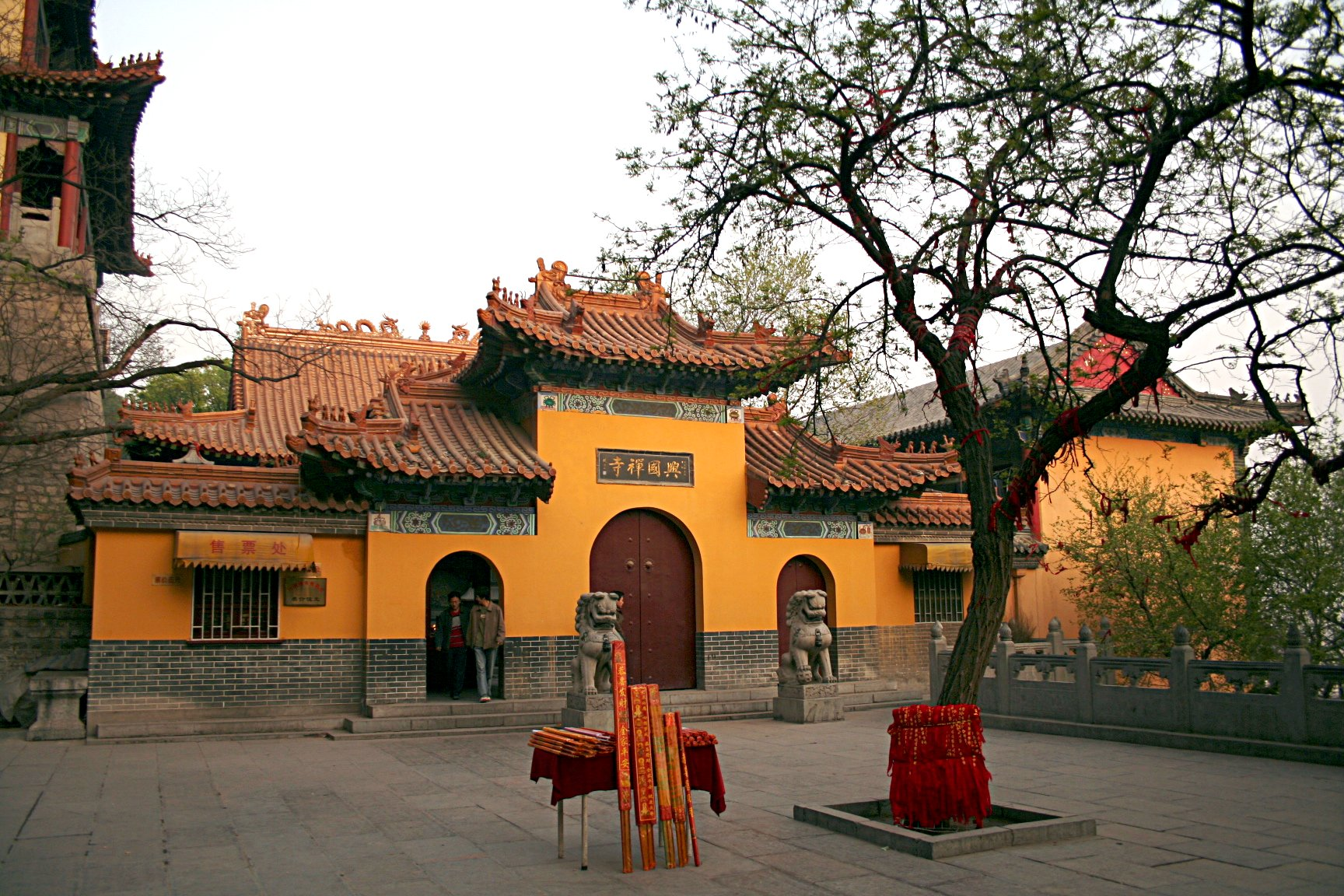
- The Shanmen at Xingguo Temple.

- Location within Shandong

Religion
- Affiliation: Buddhism
- Leadership: Shi Hong'an (释弘庵)

Location
- Location: Zhangqiu District, Jinan, Shandong
- Country: China
- Interactive map of Xingguo Temple
- Coordinates: 36°39′00″N 117°25′39″E

Architecture
- Style: Chinese architecture
- Established: Kaihuang period (581–600)
- Completed: 1468 (reconstruction)

Website
- www.xgcs.org

Xingguo Temple (simplified Chinese: 兴国寺; traditional Chinese: 興國寺; pinyin: Xīngguó Sì) is a Buddhist temple located in Zhangqiu District of Jinan, Shandong, China.

== History ==
Xingguo Temple was originally built in the Kaihuang period (581–600) of Sui dynasty (581–618) with the name of "Thousand Buddha Temple" (千佛寺). The temple had reached unprecedented heyday in the Zhenguan period (627–649) of the Tang dynasty (618–907). Its name was changed into "Xingguo Chan Temple" (兴国禅寺).

After the fall of the Southern Song dynasty (1127–1279), the entire temple was ruined in wars and natural disasters.

In 1468, in the reign of Chenghua Emperor of the Ming dynasty (1368–1644), Su Xian (苏贤) raised funds to restore the temple on the original site. Four Heavenly Kings Hall, Mahavira Hall, bedrooms and storehouse were added to the temple.

It went through two rebuilds in the Qing dynasty (1644–1911), respectively in the Jiaqing period and Xianfeng period.

During the ten-year Cultural Revolution (1966–1976) the Red Guards had attacked the temple, some of the stone statues of Buddha were slightly damaged in the massive movement.

In 1983, it has been designated as a National Key Buddhist Temple in Han Chinese Area by the State Council of China.

== Architecture ==
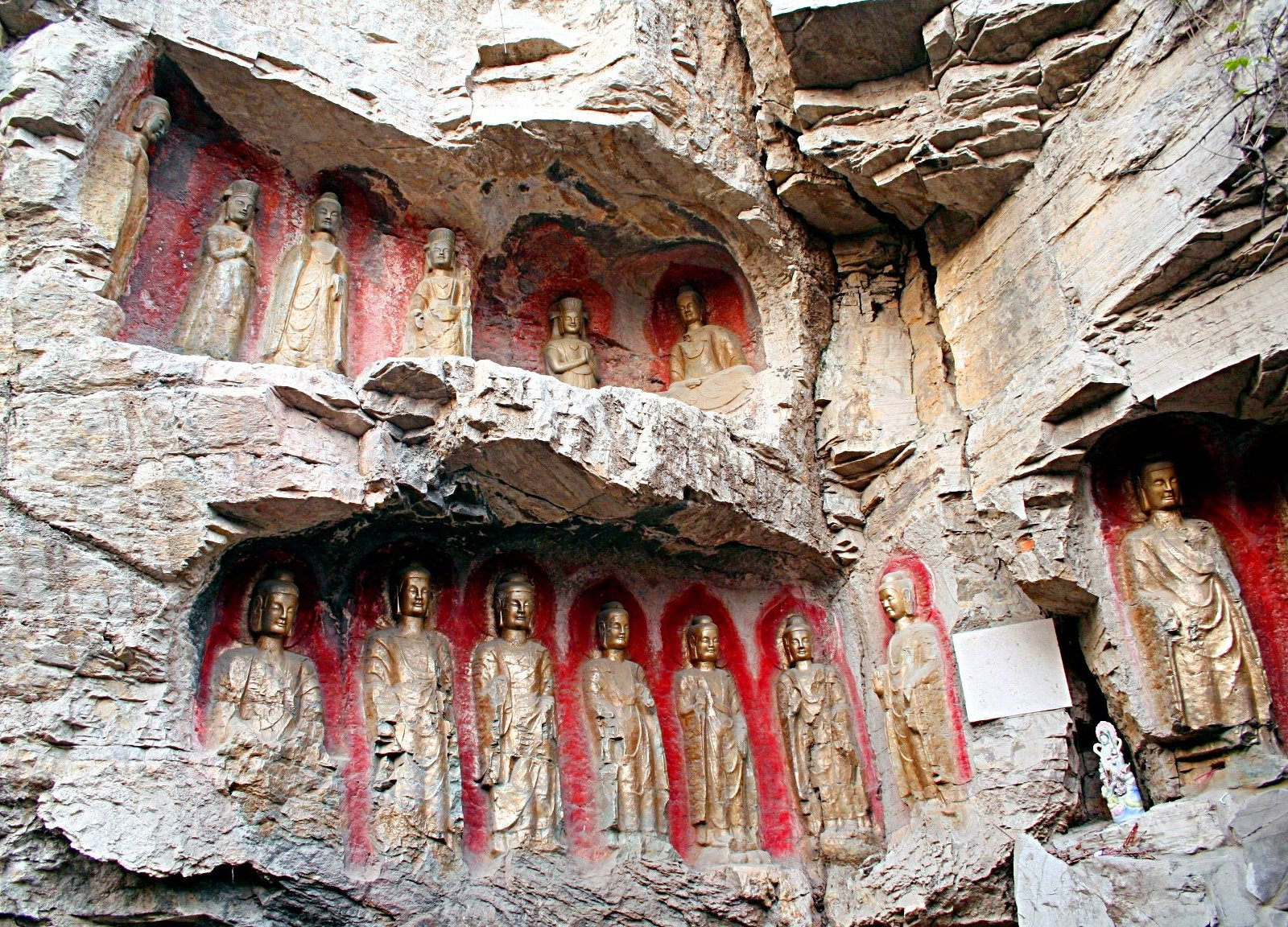
The Thousand Buddha Cliff.

The extant structure is based on the Ming and Qing dynasties building principles and retains the traditional architectural style. Main structures from the Shanmen to the Buddhist Texts Library are aligned with the central axis and divided into four countyards.

=== Shanmen ===
Under the eaves of the Shanmen is a plaque with the Chinese characters "Xingguo Chan Temple" written by former Venerable Master of the Buddhist Association of China Zhao Puchu. In front of the hall, a wooden plaque with a couplet is hung on the two side pillars. It says "暮鼓晨钟，惊醒世间名利客；经声佛号，唤回苦海梦迷人". It was composed and inscribed by Qing dynasty scholar Yang Zhaoqing (杨兆庆).

=== Mahavira Hall ===
The Mahavira Hall enshrining the Three Saints of Huayan (华严三圣). In the middle is Shijiamouni, statues of Wenshu and Puxian stand on the left and right sides of Sakyamuni's statue. In front of Sakyamuni stand Ananda and Kassapa Buddha on the left and right. At the back of Sakyamuni enshrines the statue of Guanyin with Shancai standing on the left and Longnü on the right. The statues of Eighteen Arhats stand on both sides of the hall.

=== Jade Buddha Hall ===
The Mahavira Hall houses statues of Shijiamouni, Dizang and Thousand Armed and Eyed Guanyin. The sitting statue of Sakyamuni is made of jadeite.

=== Thousand Buddha Cliff ===
In the Thousand Buddha Cliff (千佛崖) that is opposite to the temple, there are many stone statues made by artisans in the Sui and Tang dynasties. The over 200 stone statues are carved with integrate structural and exquisite techniques.
