= Geyuan Temple =

Buddhist temple in Laiyuan, China

Coordinates: 39°21′10″N 114°40′55″E

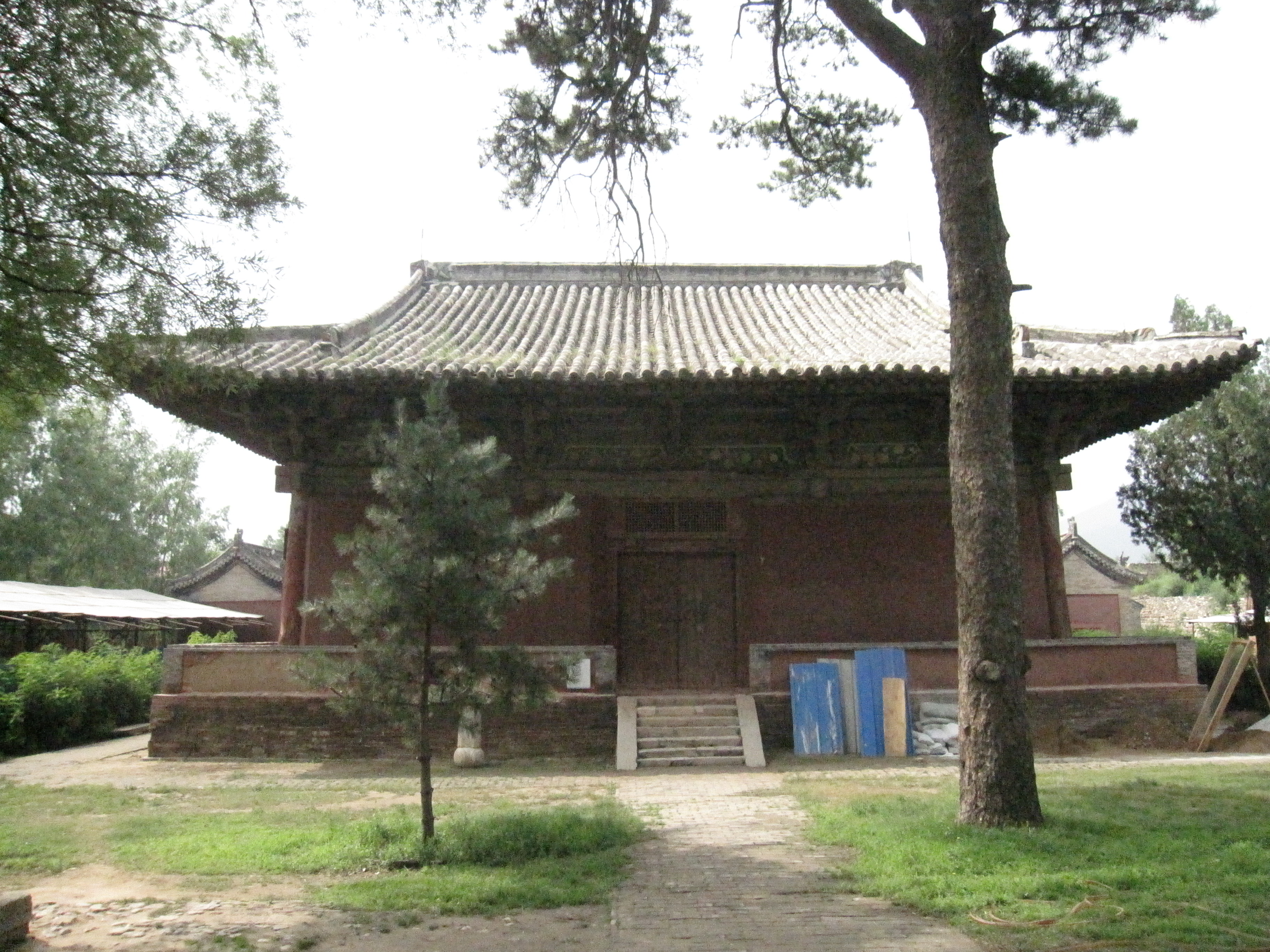
- The Wenshu Hall (Chinese: 文殊殿; pinyin: Wénshū Diàn; lit. 'Hall of Manjusri') of the Geyuan Temple

Religion
- Affiliation: Buddhist
- Province: Hebei

Location
- Location: Laiyuan
- Interactive map of Geyuan Temple

Architecture
- Completed: 10th century

Geyuan Temple (simplified Chinese: 阁院寺; traditional Chinese: 閣院寺; pinyin: Géyuàn Sì; lit. 'Ge Courtyard Temple') is a Buddhist temple located in Laiyuan, Hebei Province, China. The temple consists of three main buildings and other auxiliary structures. The main hall of the temple, the Wenshu Hall dates from 966 CE.

== History ==
Very little is known about the temple's history. Most of what is known have been from studying the stele at the temple and a local historical account written in 1875 called the Laiyuanxian Zhi. Geyuan Temple was first founded in the Han dynasty, destroyed, and then rebuilt during the Tang dynasty. The octagonal pillar at the temple, the oldest of the current structures at the Wenshu Hall, dates to 966 of the Liao dynasty. The temple's construction was funded by a patron called Li Yuanchao, who helped found the Later Tang. Another stele from 1568 also confirms the founding date to be during the Liao dynasty. Repairs were made from 1324 to 1327, during the Ming dynasty, in 1507, and then during the Jiajing period (1522–1567).

Though many ancient temples were surveyed during the 1930s by historians and architects like Liang Sicheng, Geyuan Temple's age and architectural significance were not recognized until 1960, when a study dated the building to be from the Liao dynasty. The late discovery date is explained by Laiyuan's extreme isolation in the mountains of Western Hebei province.

== Layout ==
Geyuan Temple contains three main buildings, the Wenshu Hall, a multistory pavilion used to store sutras and a Tianwang Hall. Unlike the normal Chinese temple layout, in which structures are built along a central axis from south to north, Geyuan temples' buildings face west.

=== Wenshu Hall ===
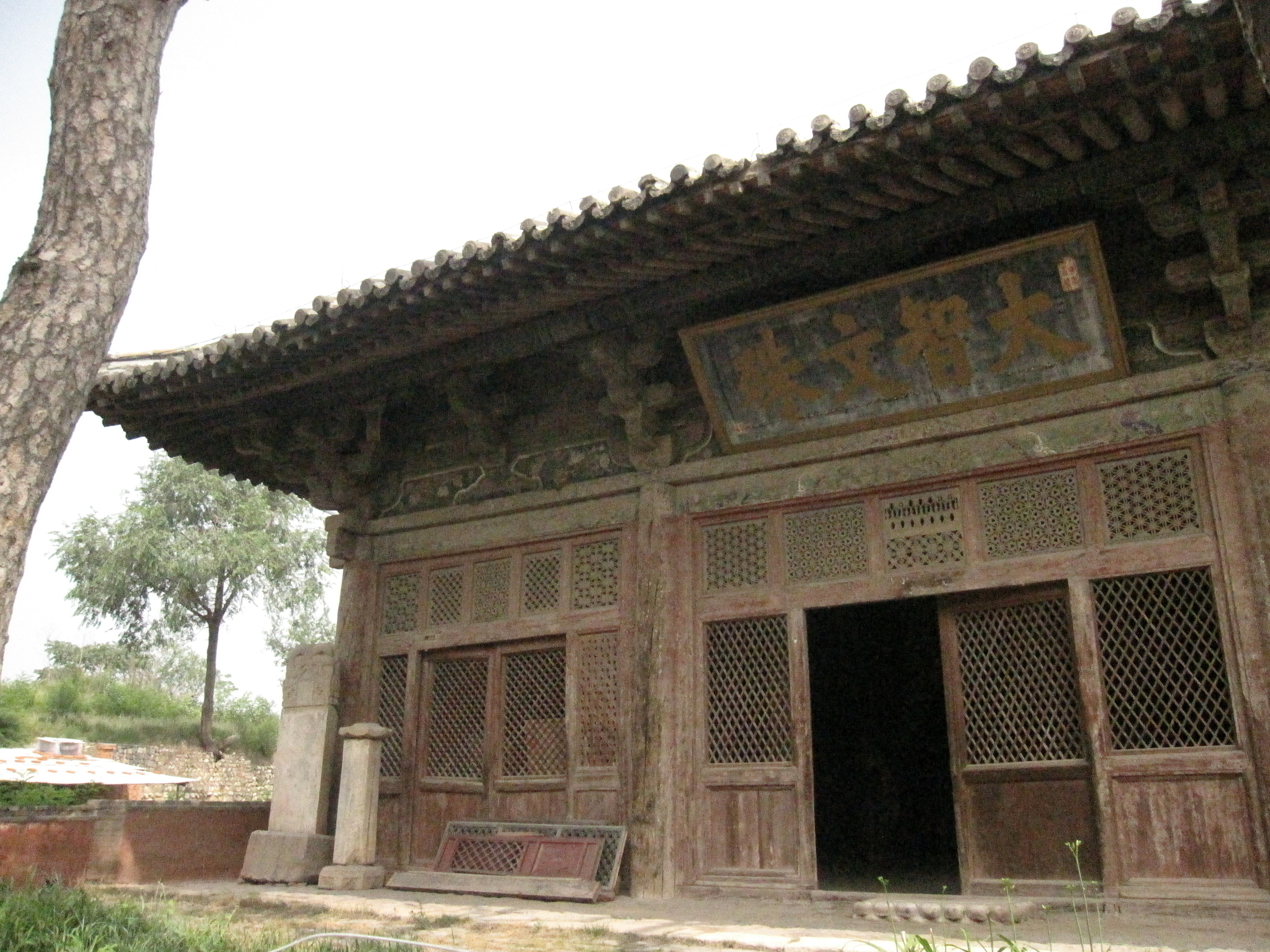
The front of the Wenshu Hall.

Wenshu Hall (Chinese: 文殊殿; pinyin: Wénshū Diàn; lit. 'Hall of Manjusri') was first built in 966 and is the oldest Liao building that is still extant, built 59 years after the dynasty's founding. It is a square structure that is three bays wide and measures 15 by 15.67 meters. Each bay on the front façade contains four door panels, and the hall is built upon a large yuetai. The hall has no ceiling, but has beams that span six rafters and two additional interior pillars for support. Like other buildings dating from the 10th century, all the beams in the hall are completely straight. 5 and 7 rank bracketing is used to support the roof. The doors to the hall retain original 10th-century latticework. Wenshu Hall is one of the Eight Great Architectures of the Liao Dynasty.
