= Yunmen Temple (Hunan) =

Buddhist temple in Xiangxiang, Hunan, China

- 云门寺
- Location within Hunan Location within China

Religion
- Affiliation: Buddhism
- Deity: Chan Buddhism
- Leadership: Shi Fatong (释法通)

Location
- Location: Xiangxiang, Hunan
- Country: China
- Coordinates: 27°44′31″N 112°32′20″E

Architecture
- Style: Chinese architecture
- Established: 1050
- Completed: Daoguang period (1821–1850)

Website
- www.xxyms.com

Yunmen Temple (simplified Chinese: 云门寺; traditional Chinese: 雲門寺; pinyin: Yúnmén Sì) is a Buddhist temple located in Xiangxiang, Hunan, China.

== History ==
The original temple dates back to the 1050, in the reign of Emperor Renzong of the Song dynasty. At that time it initially called "Stone Stele Temple" (石碑寺). It was renamed Yunmen Temple during the Yongle era (1403–1424) of the early Ming dynasty (1368–1644). The present version still maintain the style of the Qing dynasty.

In 1959, the temple has been authorized as the provincial key cultural unit by the Hunan Provincial Government.

In 2005, it was classified as a provincial key Buddhist temple by the Hunan Provincial Government.

== Architecture ==
Now the existing main buildings include Frontal Hall, Middle Hall, Mahavira Hall and Guanyin Hall.

=== Hall of Guanyin ===
The Hall of Guanyin is 17.5 metres (57 ft) wide, 35.4 metres (116 ft) deep and 15 metres (49 ft) high with double eaves gable and hip roof (重檐歇山顶). A 11.4 metres (37 ft) wood carving statue of Thousand Armed and Eyed Guanyin is preserved in the center of the hall, which is the largest wood carving statue of Guanyin in Jiangnan.

The statues of Eighteen Arhats are placed in the corridor of the temple. They were carved in 1893 with stone. Each of them is 1.5 metres (4 ft 11 in) high.

=== Xiangxiang Museum ===
The Xiangxiang Museum is located in the temple. It was constructed in 1959 by Xiangxiang Municipal Government. A total of 7,000 cultural relics houses in the museum.
