= Dizang Temple =

Dizang Temple (Chinese: 地藏寺; pinyin: Dìzàng Sì) may refer to:

- Dizang Temple (Changchun), in Changchun, Jilin, China
- Dizang Temple (Fuzhou), in Fuzhou, Fujian, China
