= Chongshan Temple (Shanxi) =

Buddhist temple in Shanxi, China

- 崇善寺
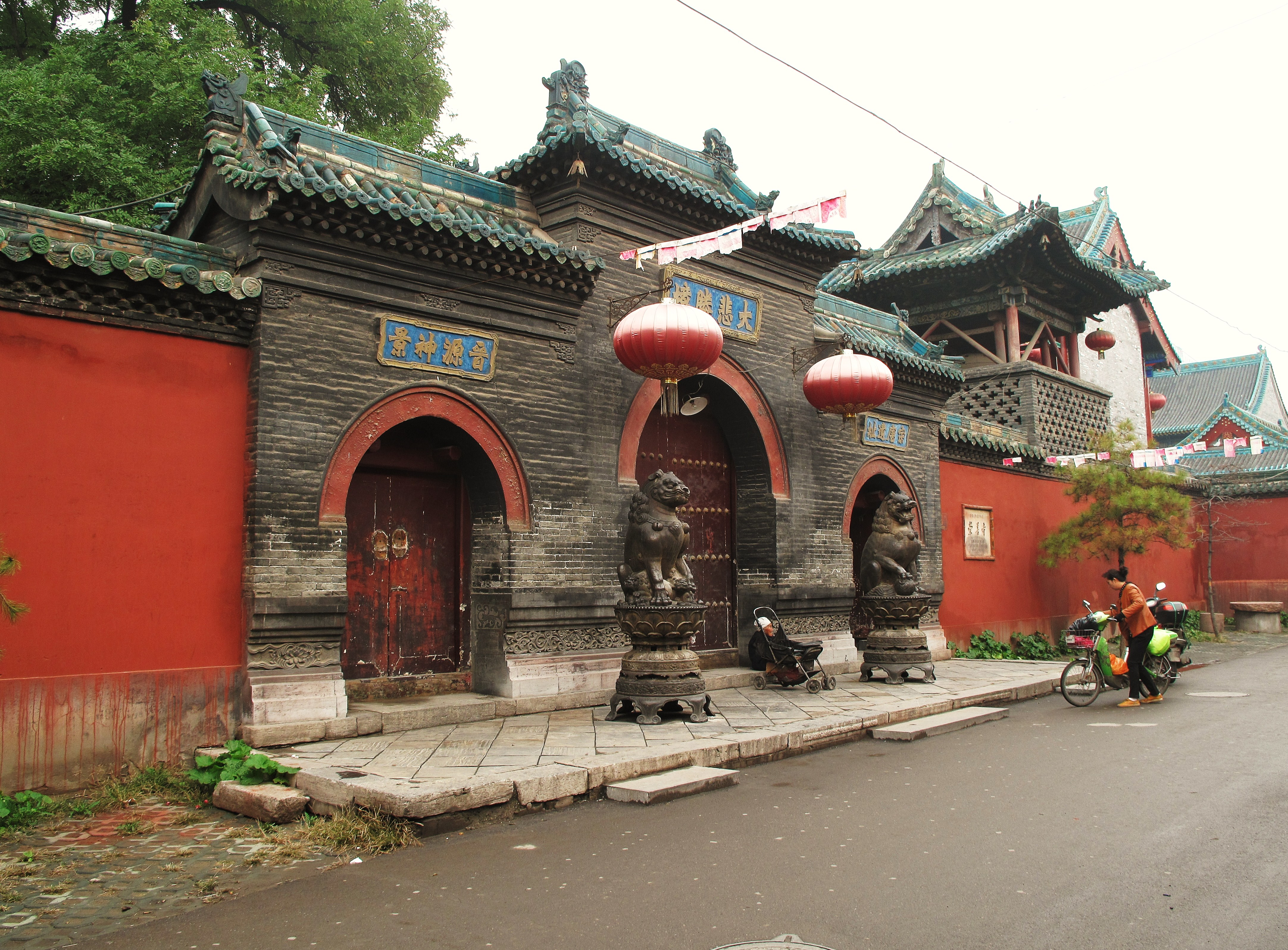
- The Shanmen at Chongshan Temple.

- Location within Shanxi

Religion
- Affiliation: Buddhism
- Sect: Chan Buddhism

Location
- Location: Yingze District, Taiyuan, Shanxi
- Country: China
- Interactive map of Chongshan Temple
- Coordinates: 37°52′23″N 112°35′11″E

Architecture
- Style: Chinese architecture
- Established: Tang dynasty
- Completed: 1381 (reconstruction)

Chongshan Temple (Chinese: 崇善寺; pinyin: Chóngshàn Sì) is a Buddhist temple located in Yingze District of Taiyuan, Shanxi. It is the headquarters of the Buddhist Association of Shanxi.

== History ==
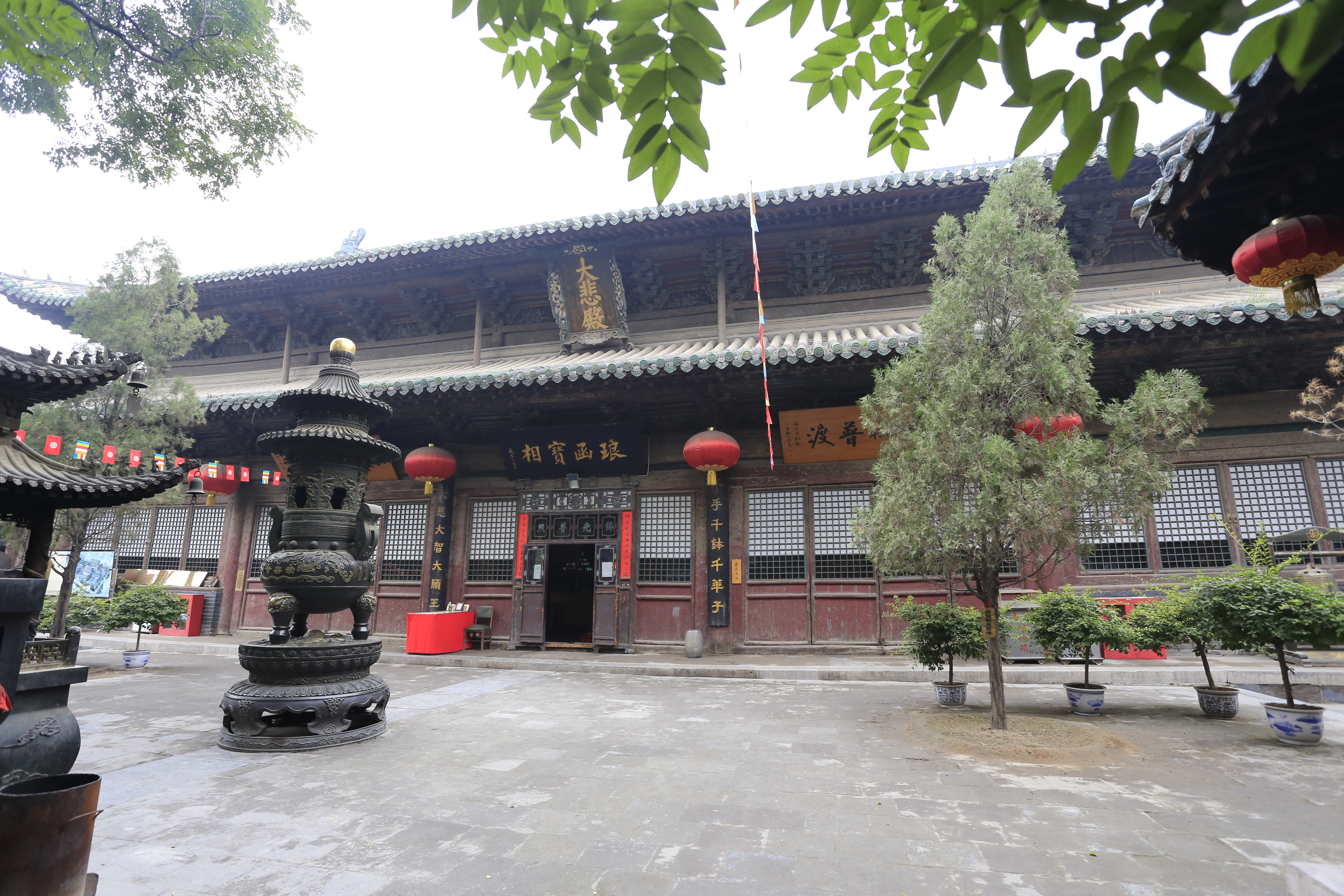
The Hall of Great Compassion at Chongshan Temple

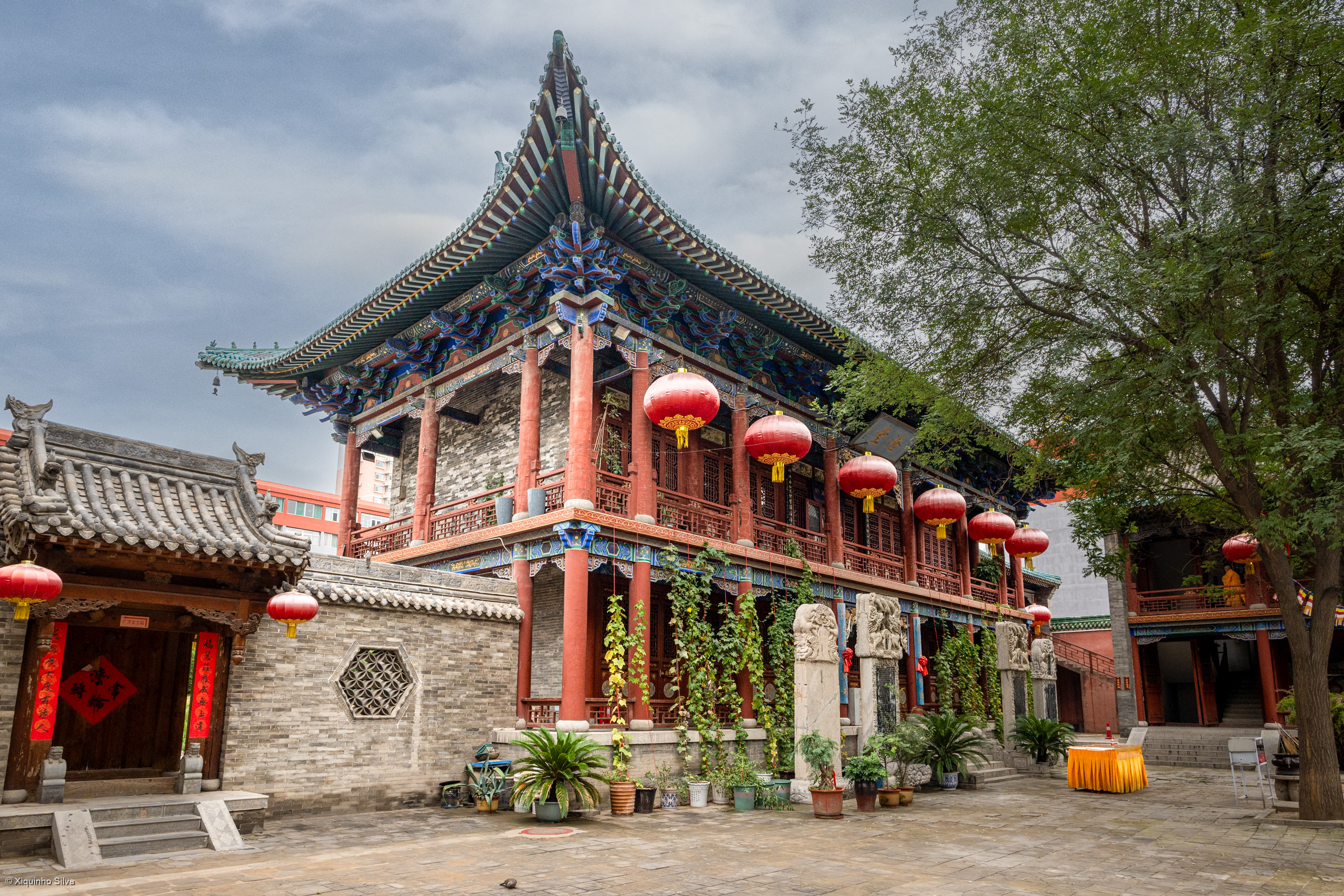
The Dharma Hall at Chongshan Temple

=== Tang dynasty ===
The original temple dates back to the Tang dynasty (618–907). It initially called "White Horse Temple" (白马寺) and later became "Yanshou Temple" (延寿寺) and "Zongshan Temple" (宗善寺). The current name dates to the Ming dynasty (1368–1644).

=== Ming dynasty ===
In 1381, in the 14th year of Hongwu period (1368–1398) in the Ming dynasty, Zhu Gang (朱棡), the third son of Hongwu Emperor, expanded the temple on its ruins in memory of his mother.

=== Qing dynasty ===
In 1864, in the reign of Tongzhi Emperor (1862–1874) in the Qing dynasty (1644–1911), a disastrous fire destroyed most of its buildings with only the Hall of Great Compassion remaining.

In 1881, under the rule of Guangxu Emperor (1875–1908), Zhang Zhidong, the then provincial governor of Shanxi, established a Confucious temple on the ruins.

=== People's Republic of China ===
Chongshan Temple has been designated as a National Key Buddhist Temple in Han Chinese Area by the State Council of China in 1983.

On March 5, 2013, it was listed among the seventh batch of "Major National Historical and Cultural Sites in Shanxi" by the State Council of China.

== Architecture ==
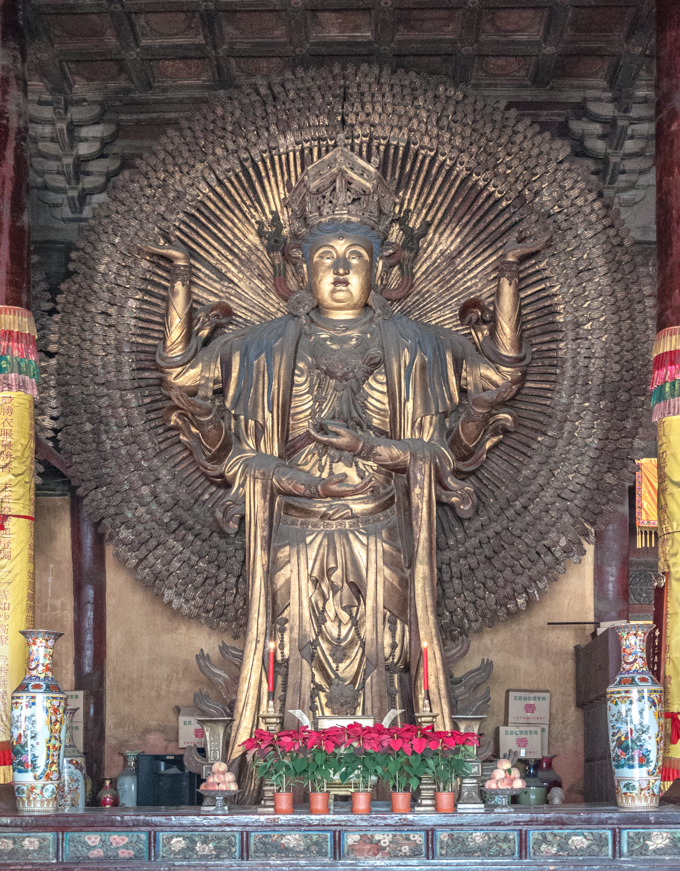
Thousand-armed and bowls Manjusri at the Hall of Great Compassion.

The temple occupies a total area of 140,000-square-metre (1,500,000 sq ft). Now the existing main buildings include Shanmen, Bell tower, Drum tower, Mahavira Hall and Hall of Great Compassion.

=== Hall of Great Compassion ===
The Hall of Great Compassion is seven rooms wide and four rooms deep with double eaves gable and hip roofs. It still preserves the structural and architectural style in the Ming dynasty. In the middle of the hall placed the statue of Thousand-armed and eyed Guanyin with statues of Thousand-armed and bowls Manjusri and Samantabhadra stand on the left and right sides. The statues were made in the Hongwu period of the Ming dynasty. Each of them is 8.5-metre (28 ft) high.

== National Treasures ==
=== Chinese guardian lions ===
A pair of Chinese guardian lions stands on both sides of the Shanmen. They were cast in 1391, in the 24th year of Hongwu period (1368–1398) in the Ming dynasty (1368–1644).

=== Ming dynasty bell ===
An iron bell hanging on the Bell tower. It is 2 metres (6 ft 7 in) high and it is 4,999.5 kilograms (11,022 lb) in weight. Its outside diameter is 1.8 metres (5 ft 11 in). It was cast in 1506, in the Zhengde period (1506–1521) of the Ming dynasty (1368–1644).
