= Cishou Temple =

Buddhist temple on Mount Nang, China

- 慈寿寺

- Location within Fujian

Religion
- Affiliation: Buddhism
- Sect: Chan Buddhism

Location
- Location: Hanjiang District, Putian, Fujian
- Country: China
- Coordinates: 25°30′33″N 119°08′31″E

Architecture
- Style: Chinese architecture
- Founder: Miaoying (妙应)
- Established: 876
- Completed: 20th century (reconstruction)

Cishou Temple (simplified Chinese: 慈寿寺; traditional Chinese: 慈壽寺; pinyin: Císhòu Sì), also known as Nangshan Temple or Temple of Mount Nang (囊山寺), is a Buddhist temple located on Mount Nang (囊山), in Putian, Fujian, China.

== History ==
=== Tang dynasty ===
Cishou Temple was built by an eminent Buddhist monk Miaoying (妙应) in 876, in the ruling of Emperor Xizong (874–888) of the Tang dynasty (618–907). Ten years later, Wang Shenzhi (王审知), the King of Fujian, expanded the temple, in memory of his mother's birthday. Emperor Xizong inscribed and honored the name "Cishou Chan Temple" (慈寿禅寺).

=== Song dynasty ===
Cishou Temple was largely extended and renovated in 1034, in the reign of Emperor Renzong (1023–1063) of the Song dynasty (960–1279). Fangmu Pavilion (放目亭), Yuntao Pavilion (云涛亭), Canngxia Pavilion (苍霞亭), Zhanlü Pavilion (蘸绿亭), Shiping Hall (石屏轩), Songfeng Pavilion (松风阁), Yunwo Hall (云卧堂), Baiyun Hall (白云堂), Haiyue Hall (海月堂), Yanshou Hall (延寿堂) and other halls and pavilions were gradually added to the temple. In the heyday of the temple, hundreds of monks lived in the temple.

=== Yuan dynasty ===
Cishou Temple reduced to ashes by a devastating fire in 1287, in the 24th year of Zhiyuan period (1264–1294) in the Yuan dynasty (1271–1368). Abbot Shengong (深公) restored and refurbished the temple in 1366. After the fall of the Yuan dynasty, Cishou Temple was completely destroyed and went to ruin in wars.

=== Ming dynasty ===
In 1378, in the 11th year of Hongwu period (1368–1398) in the Ming dynasty (1368–1644), abbot Daojie (道杰) rebuilt the Dharma Hall and Guru Hall. Twenty years later, abbot Xiangjiang (湘江) raised funds to restore the Kitchen, Dining Hall and monk's rooms. Pilu Hall (毗卢殿), Lunzang Hall (轮藏殿), Bell tower and Drum tower were reconstructed in 1411 by abbot Yongqing (永清), under the rule of Yongle Emperor (1402–1424). Cishou Temple had been a resurgence of Chan Buddhism in 1433, in the reign of Xuande Emperor (1426–1435).

Since Jiajing Emperor (1522–1566) believed in Taoism, he ordered to demolish Buddhist temples, confiscate temple lands and force monks to return to secular life. Cishou Temple went through three destructive actions, only the Lunzang Hall and Drum tower survived.

=== Qing dynasty ===
During the whole period of the Qing dynasty (1644–1911), Cishou Temple gradually declined and was incredibly disappeared. Abbot Tongyuan (通源) restored the Mahavira Hall in 1885, in the reign of Guangxu Emperor (1875–1908). Dharma Hall, Meditation Hall, Reception Hall, Bell tower, Drum tower, Guru Hall, Merit Hall, Dharma Protectors Hall were gradually established in 1908.

=== Republic of China ===
In 1932, abbot Huaguang and masters Zhengming and Miaoyi founded the Shanmen and Abbot's Hall, which are still well-preserved.

=== People's Republic of China ===
After the establishment of the Communist State, the Fujian Government offered great protection to Cishou Temple.

In 1951, under the support of overseas Chinese monks, a pagoda and Buddhist Texts Library were added to the temple.

During the Cultural Revolution in 1966, the red guards had attacked and badly damaged the temple for ten years and more than thirty resident monks were forced to flee the temple. By 1976, some monks were finally allowed to return to the temple.

After the 3rd plenary session of the 11th Central Committee of the Chinese Communist Party, according to the national policy of free religious belief, Cishou Temple was officially reopened to the public in 1981. In 1982, overseas Chinese monks who were residing in Malaysia and Indonesia provided financial support to rebuild the temple completely.

Cishou Temple has been designated as a National Key Buddhist Temple in Han Chinese Area by the State Council of China in 1983. In 1990, there were about thirty eight monks residing in the temple.
