= Yuanming Jiangtang =

Building in Jing'an District, China

- 圆明讲堂
- Location within Shanghai

Religion
- Affiliation: Buddhism
- Sect: Pure Land Buddhism
- Leadership: Shi Zhaocheng (释照诚)

Location
- Location: Jing'an District, Shanghai
- Country: China
- Coordinates: 31°13′28″N 121°26′40″E

Architecture
- Style: Chinese architecture
- Founder: Yuan Ying
- Established: 1934
- Completed: 1934

Yuanming Jiangtang (simplified Chinese: 圆明讲堂; traditional Chinese: 圓明講堂; pinyin: Yuánmíng Jiǎngtáng; lit. 'Yuanming Lecture Room') is a Buddhist temple located in the Jing'an District of Shanghai.

== History ==
Yuanming Jiangtang was built by first Venerable Master of the Buddhist Association of China Yuan Ying in 1934, where he taught Pure Land Buddhism for almost ten years, and attracted large numbers of practitioners. The Yuanming Lengyan School (圆明楞严专宗学院) and Shanghai Yuanming Buddhist College (上海圆明佛学院) were established in 1945 and 1948 respectively. In 1958, the temple was used as a factory. During the ten-year Cultural Revolution the Red Guards had attacked the temple in 1966. The temple has been designated as a National Key Buddhist Temple in Han Chinese Area by the State Council of China in 1983. That same year, regular sutra lectures, meditation and other features of temple life were resumed.

A Buddhist seminary was re-established in 1997. In 2000, with the Longhua Temple monastery as co-sponsor, a new combined seminary was established under the name of "Hualin Buddhist Seminary" (华林佛学院).

== Architecture ==
The existing main buildings include the Shanmen, Yuanming Lecture Room, Hall of Guanyin, Memorial Hall of Yuan Ying, and Buddhist Texts Library.
