= Fangguang Temple =

Buddhist temple in Taizhou, Zhejiang, China

- 方广寺

- Location within Zhejiang

Religion
- Affiliation: Buddhism
- Sect: Chan Buddhism
- Leadership: Shi Dingrong (释定荣)

Location
- Location: Mount Tiantai, Taizhou, Zhejiang
- Country: China
- Interactive map of Fangguang Temple
- Coordinates: 29°15′07″N 121°02′16″E

Architecture
- Style: Chinese architecture
- Founder: Tanyou (昙猷)
- Established: 363–365
- Completed: 1980s (reconstruction)

Fangguang Temple (simplified Chinese: 方广寺; traditional Chinese: 方廣寺; pinyin: Fāngguǎng Sì) is a Buddhist temple located on Mount Tiantai in Taizhou, Zhejiang, China. The temple is the Bodhimanda of Five Hundred Arhats.

== History ==
=== Eastern Jin dynasty ===
The original temple dates back to the Xingning period (363–365) of the Jin dynasty (266–420), founded by monk Tanyou (昙猷).

=== Tang dynasty ===
In the Tang dynasty (618–907), its name was changed into "Fangguang Shengshou Temple" (方广圣寿寺).

=== Five Dynasties and Ten Kingdoms ===
During the Five Dynasties and Ten Kingdoms (907–960), Qian Chu (929–988), the King of Wuyue (907–978), added the Hall of Five Hundred Arhats to the temple. Since then, Fangguang Temple became the Bodhimanda of Five Hundred Arhats.

=== Song dynasty ===
In the early Song dynasty (960–1279), the emperor inscribed and honored the name "Fangguang Chongchan Temple" (方广崇禅寺). In 1101, in the reign of Emperor Huizong (1101–1125), the temple reduced to ashes by a devastating fire. In 1198, almost a century later, Fangguang Temple was restored and redecorated.

=== Ming dynasty ===
In 1604, in the late Ming dynasty (1368–1644), Ge Yipeng (葛一鹏) supervised the reconstruction of Fangguang Temple. 30 years later, Wang Fuzhi and Xia Rubi (夏汝弼) raised funds to renovate the temple. Renovations and rebuilding to the main building began in 1634 and were completed in 1636.

=== Qing dynasty ===
In the ruling of Daoguang Emperor (1821–1850) in the Qing dynasty (1644–1911), Zeng Guoquan, a general of the Xiang Army, appropriated a large sum of money for refurbishing the temple.

=== People's Republic of China ===
During the ten-year Cultural Revolution, a disastrous fire consumed Fangguang Temple.

A modern restoration of the entire temple complex was carried out in 1980, after the 3rd Plenary Session of the 11th Central Committee of the Chinese Communist Party.

Fangguang Temple has been inscribed as a National Key Buddhist Temple in Han Chinese Area by the State Council of China in 1983.

== Architecture ==
The existing main buildings include the Shanmen, Mahavira Hall, Hall of Five Hundred Arhats, Hall of Ksitigarbha, and wing-rooms.
