= Shifang Temple =

Buddhist temple in Shanxi, China

Shifang Temple Guangren Temple
- 十方堂
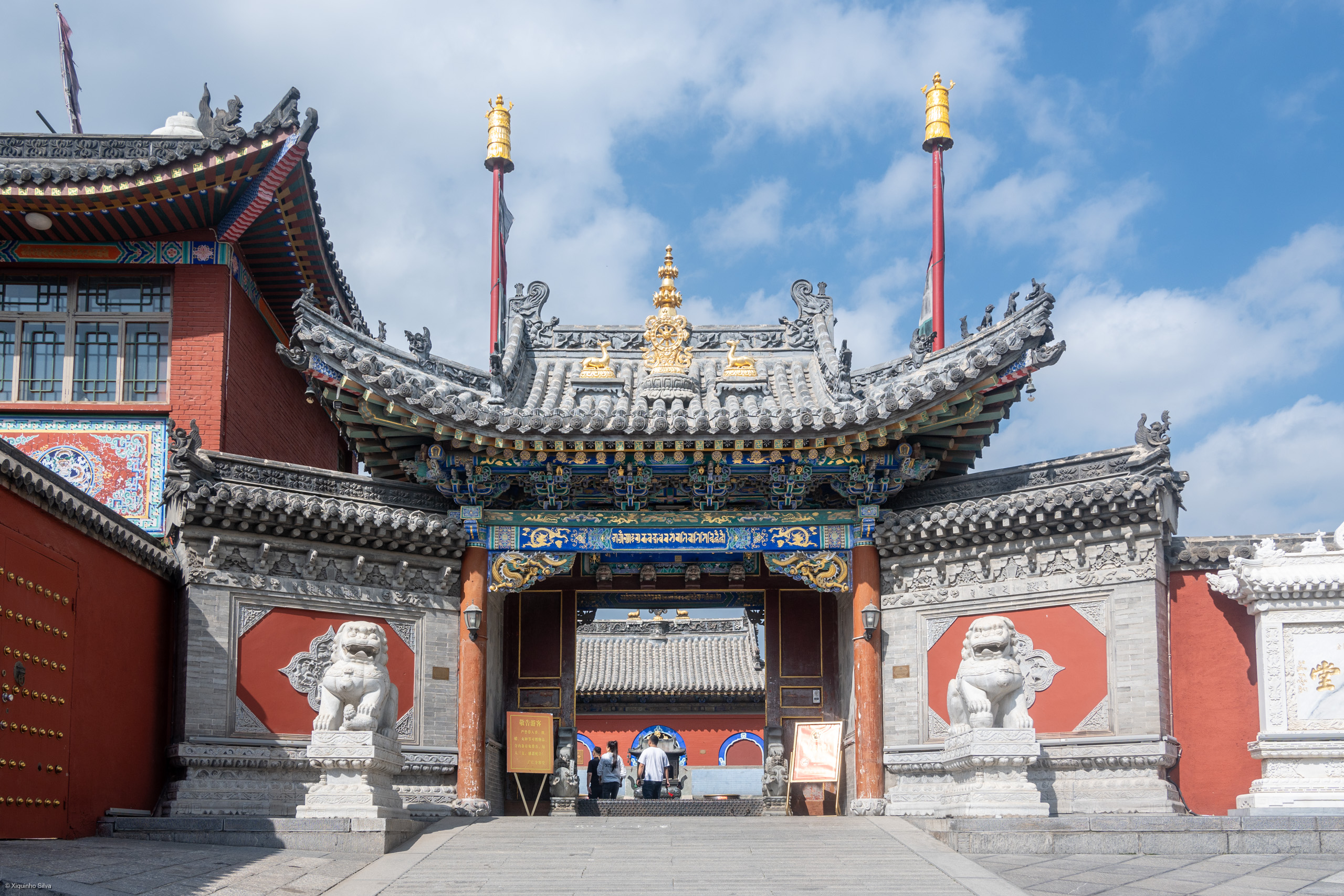

- Location within Shanxi

Religion
- Affiliation: Buddhism
- Sect: Gelug

Location
- Location: Mount Wutai, Xinzhou, Shanxi
- Country: China
- Interactive map of Shifang Temple; Guangren Temple
- Coordinates: 39°00′52″N 113°36′18″E

Architecture
- Style: Chinese architecture
- Established: 1821–1850

Shifang Temple (Chinese: 十方堂; pinyin: Shífāng Táng), also known as Guangren Temple (simplified Chinese: 广仁寺; traditional Chinese: 廣仁寺; pinyin: Guǎngrén Sì), is a Buddhist temple located on Mount Wutai, in Taihuai Town of Wutai County, Shanxi, China.

== History ==
The temple was first established in the Daoguang period (1821–1850) of the Qing dynasty (1644–1911).

In 1983, it has been designated as a National Key Buddhist Temple in Han Chinese Area by the State Council of China.

== Architecture ==
The temple occupies an area of 3,645 square metres (39,230 sq ft) with 54 rooms and halls. The extant structure is based on the Qing dynasty building principles and retains the traditional architectural style. The temple is divided into three countyards with three halls, namely the Hall of Four Heavenly Kings, Hall of Maitreya and Hall of Je Tsongkhapa.

=== Hall of Maitreya ===
The Hall of Maitreya enshrining Maitreya Buddha, who is regarded as the future Buddha and Sakyamuni's successor.

A set of Kangyur which was printed between 1821 and 1850 is preserved in the hall.

=== Hall of Je Tsongkhapa ===
The Hall of Je Tsongkhapa houses a copper statue of Je Tsongkhapa, who was a famous teacher of Tibetan Buddhism whose activities led to the formation of the Gelug school of Tibetan Buddhism. In the two interior walls one thousand miniature Buddha statues are inlaid in the alcoves.
