= Huayan Temple (Ningde) =

Buddhist temple in Fujian, China

- 华严寺

- Location within Fujian

Religion
- Affiliation: Buddhism
- Sect: Chan Buddhism

Location
- Location: Jiaocheng District, Ningde, Fujian
- Country: China
- Coordinates: 26°49′18″N 119°23′36″E

Architecture
- Style: Chinese architecture
- Founder: Shi Yuanbiao (释元表)
- Established: 971

Website
- www.zhitishan.org

Huayan Temple (simplified Chinese: 华严寺; traditional Chinese: 華嚴寺; pinyin: Huáyán Sì) is a Buddhist temple located on Mount Zhiti (支提山), in Jiaocheng District of Ningde, Fujian, China. It is the ashram of the Bodhisattva Ratnakūta (天冠菩薩).

== History ==
The temple was built in 971 by an exceptional Buddhist monk Shi Yuanbiao (释元表) from Goryeo, under the Northern Song dynasty (960–1127). Over the course of 1,200 years, the temple had several names, including "Huayan Chan Temple" (华严禅寺), "Yongxi Chan Temple" (雍熙禅寺), "Huazang Chan Temple" (华藏禅寺), and "Wanshou Chan Temple" (万寿禅寺).

== Architecture ==
The existing main buildings include the Shanmen, Four Heavenly Kings Hall, Mahavira Hall, Hall of Guru and Buddhist Texts Library.

Huayan Temple has been classified as a National Key Buddhist Temple in Han Chinese Area by the State Council of China in 1983.

=== Mahavira Hall ===
The Mahavira Hall enshrining the Three Saints of Hua-yan (华严三圣). In the middle is Sakyamuni, statues of Manjushri on the back of a green lion and Samantabhadra on the back of a white elephant stand on the left and right sides of Sakyamuni's statue. A 500-kilogram (1,100 lb) weight bronze statue of Vairocana enshrined in the hall is solemn and majestical. It was cast in 1597, in the reign of Wanli Emperor of the Ming dynasty. He wears heavenly crown and sitting on a lotus throne.

=== Buddhist Texts Library ===
The Buddhist Texts Library preserves a set of Chinese Buddhist canon, which are printed in 1599, in the 27th year of Wanli period (1573–1620) in the Ming dynasty (1368–1644).

=== National Treasures ===
A Ming dynasty purple kasaya is houses in the temple.

A total of 947 Ming dynasty stone statues of Bodhisattva Ratnakūta with different looks and manners are collected in the temple.
