= Langya Temple =

Building in Langya District, China

- 琅琊寺
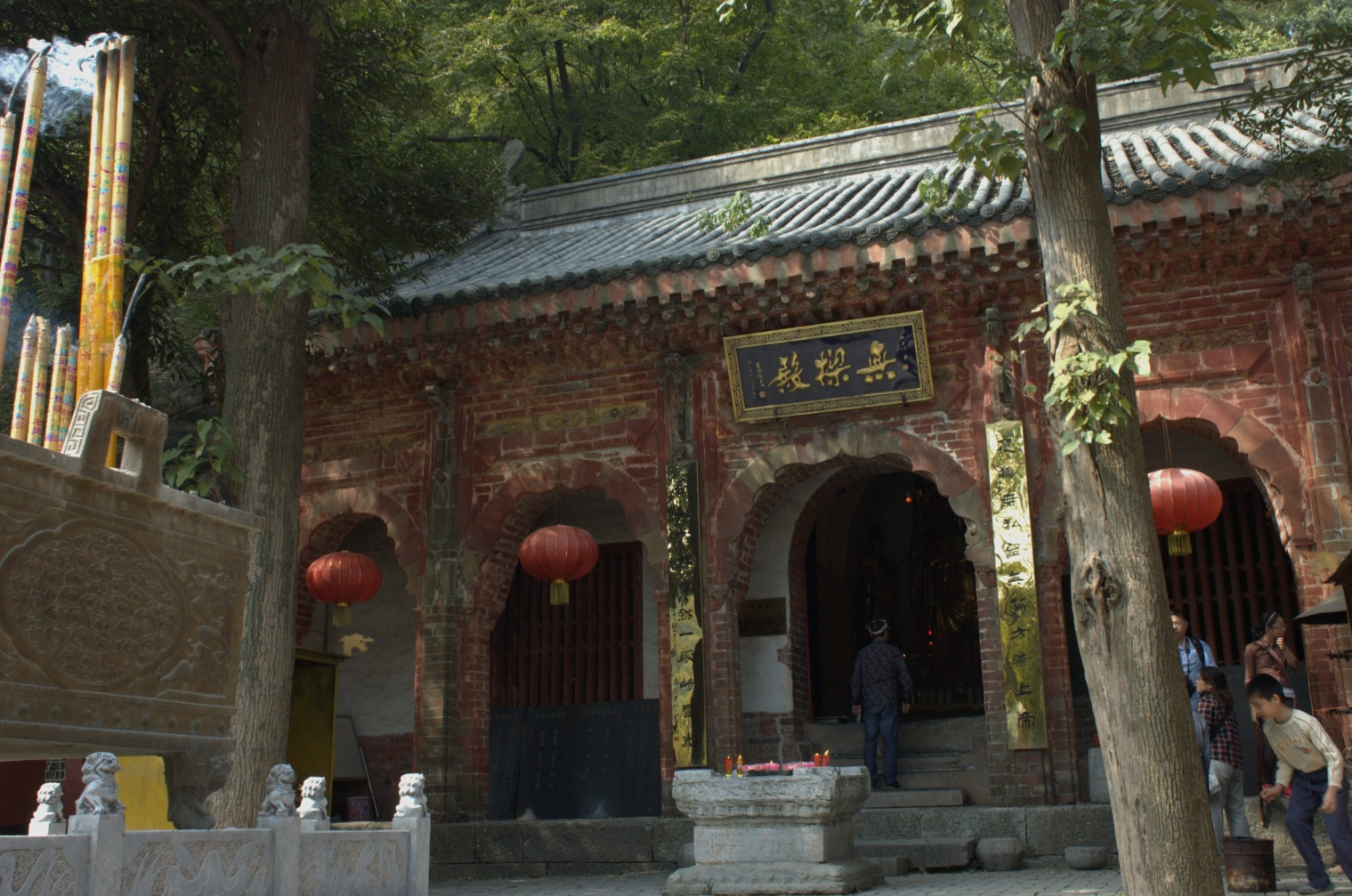
- Langyasi

Religion
- Affiliation: Buddhism
- Sect: Chan Buddhism

Location
- Location: Langya District of Chuzhou, Anhui, China
- Interactive map of Langya Temple
- Coordinates: 32°16′51″N 118°17′26″E

Architecture
- Style: Chinese architecture
- Founder: Li Youqing (李幼卿); Fachen (法琛)
- Established: 766–770
- Completed: 1904 (reconstruction)

Langya Temple (simplified Chinese: 琅琊寺; traditional Chinese: 瑯琊寺; pinyin: Lángyá Sì) is a Buddhist temple located on Mount Langya (琅琊山), in Langya District of Chuzhou, Anhui, China.

== History ==
=== Tang dynasty ===
The temple was first built by the then provincial governor of Chuzhou Li Youqing (李幼卿) and monk Fachen (法琛) between 766 and 770, during the reign of Dali period (766–779) in the Tang dynasty (618–907). After construction, Emperor Daizong (763–779) honored the name "Baoying Temple" (宝应寺).

=== Five Dynasties and Ten Kingdoms ===
The temple was devastated by war between 954 and 960, during the Five Dynasties and Ten Kingdoms (907–960), but was soon rebuilt by the provincial governor Wang Zhu (王著).

=== Song dynasty ===
In 978, in the 3rd year of Taiping Xingguo period (976–984) in the Song dynasty (960–1279), Emperor Taizong (976–997) inscribed and renamed it "Kaihua Chan Temple" (开化禅寺), more commonly known as "Langya Temple" (琅琊寺).

=== Yuan dynasty ===
Langya Temple was badly damaged by war between the Mongolian and the Red Turban Rebellion in the late Yuan dynasty (1291–1368).

=== Ming dynasty ===
After Zhu Yuanzhang (1368–1398) ascending the throne, the founder of the Ming dynasty (1368–1644), also adopted the policy to protect Buddhism. In 1373, monks Shaoning (绍宁) and Wuwei (无为) restored and refurbished the temple under the support of the government.

=== Qing dynasty ===
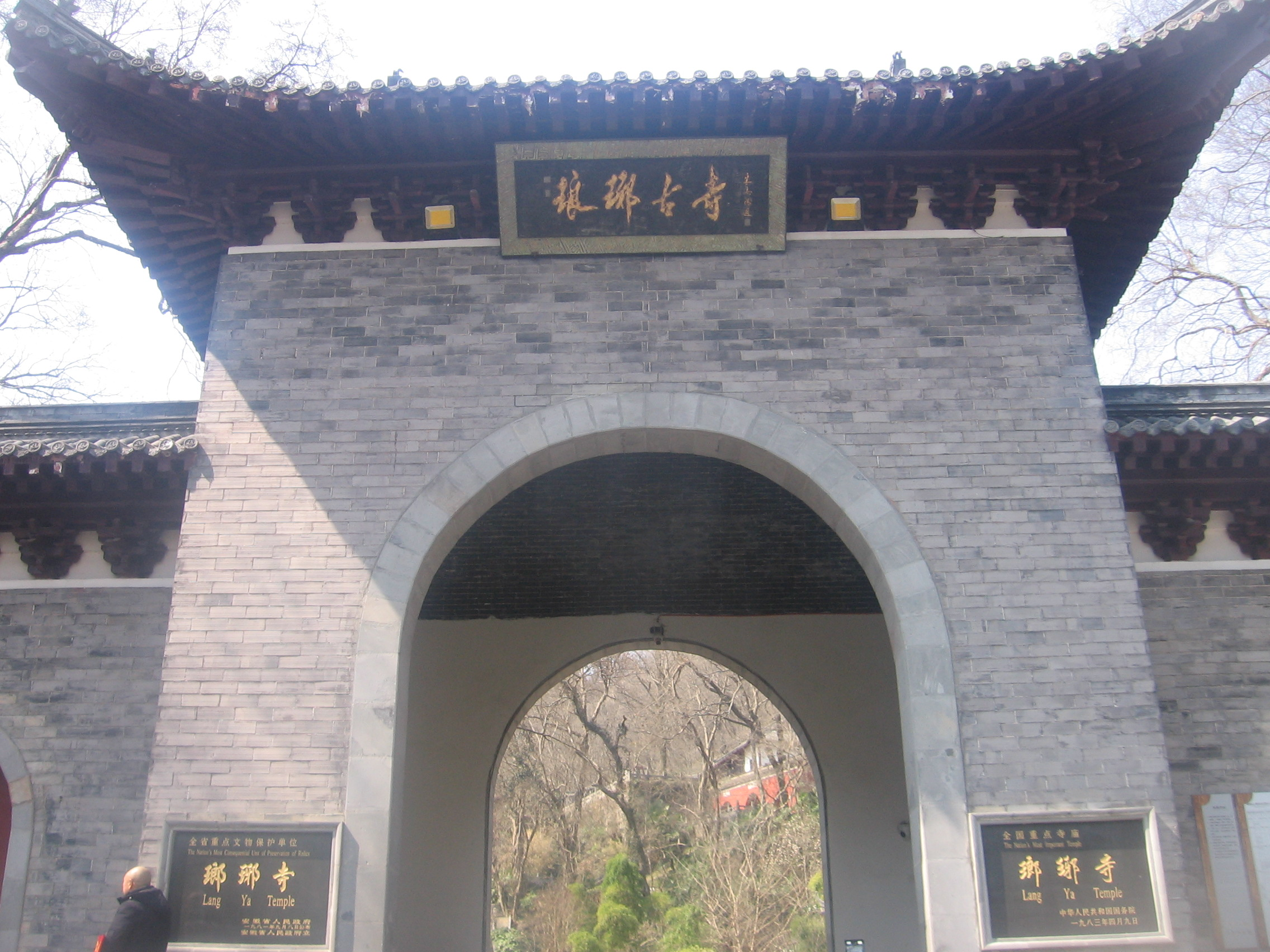
Langya Temple

In the ruling of Jiaqing Emperor (1796–1820) in the Qing dynasty (1644–1911), master Haoqing (皓清) renovated and redecorated the temple. The name was changed into "Kaihualü Temple" (开化律寺).

Langya Temple became dilapidated during the war between the Taiping Rebellion and the Qing army under the rule of Xianfeng Emperor (1851–1861).

In 1904, in the reign of Guangxu Emperor (1862–1874), master Daxiu (达修) raised funds to rebuild the temple.

=== People's Republic of China ===
After the establishment of the Communist State in 1952, the Chuzhou Municipal Government has allocated moneys for the renovation project.

The temple was inscribed to the Provincial-level Cultural Heritage List of Anhui by the Anhui Provincial Government in 1956.

Langya Temple has been designated as a National Key Buddhist Temple in Han Chinese Area by the State Council of China in 1983.

In June 1990, the Temple of Ultimate Happiness in Yangon, Myanmar presented a 1.2-metre (3 ft 11 in) high sitting statue of Sakyamuni to the temple.

== Architecture ==
The existing main buildings include the Shanmen, Four Heavenly Kings Hall, Bell tower, Drum tower, Mahavira Hall and Buddhist Texts Library.
