= Guanyin Ancient Temple =

Buddhist temple in Jilin, China

- 观音古刹

- Location within Jilin Location within China

Religion
- Affiliation: Buddhism
- Sect: Chan Buddhism

Location
- Location: Chuanying District, Jilin City, Jilin, China
- Interactive map of Guanyin Ancient Temple
- Coordinates: 43°51′15″N 126°33′39″E

Architecture
- Style: Chinese architecture
- Established: 1753
- Completed: 1938 (reconstruction)

Guanyin Ancient Temple (simplified Chinese: 观音古刹; traditional Chinese: 觀音古剎; pinyin: Guānyīn Gǔchà) is a Buddhist temple located in Chuanying District of Jilin City, Jilin, China.

== History ==
Guanyin Ancient Temple was built in 1753 in the 18th year of Emperor Qianlong's reign during the Qing dynasty (1644–1911), and underwent two renovations, respectively in 1938 and in 1980. In 1983, the temple was listed among the National Key Buddhist Temples in Han Chinese Area by the State Council of China.

== Architecture ==
Now the well-preserved buildings include the Shanmen, Tianwang Hall, Guanyin Hall, Daxiongbao Hall, Cangjing-ge, Fatang, etc.

=== Zangjing-ge ===
The Cangjing-ge ("Tower of Buddhist Texts"), storing a collection of 720 volumes of the Chinese Buddhist canon, which was printed in 1735 in the 13th year of Yongzheng era of the Qing dynasty (1644–1911). There are only two sets of 1735 woodcut prints Chinese Buddhist canon in China.
