= Ciyun Temple (Chongqing) =

Buddhist temple in Chongqing, China

- 慈云寺
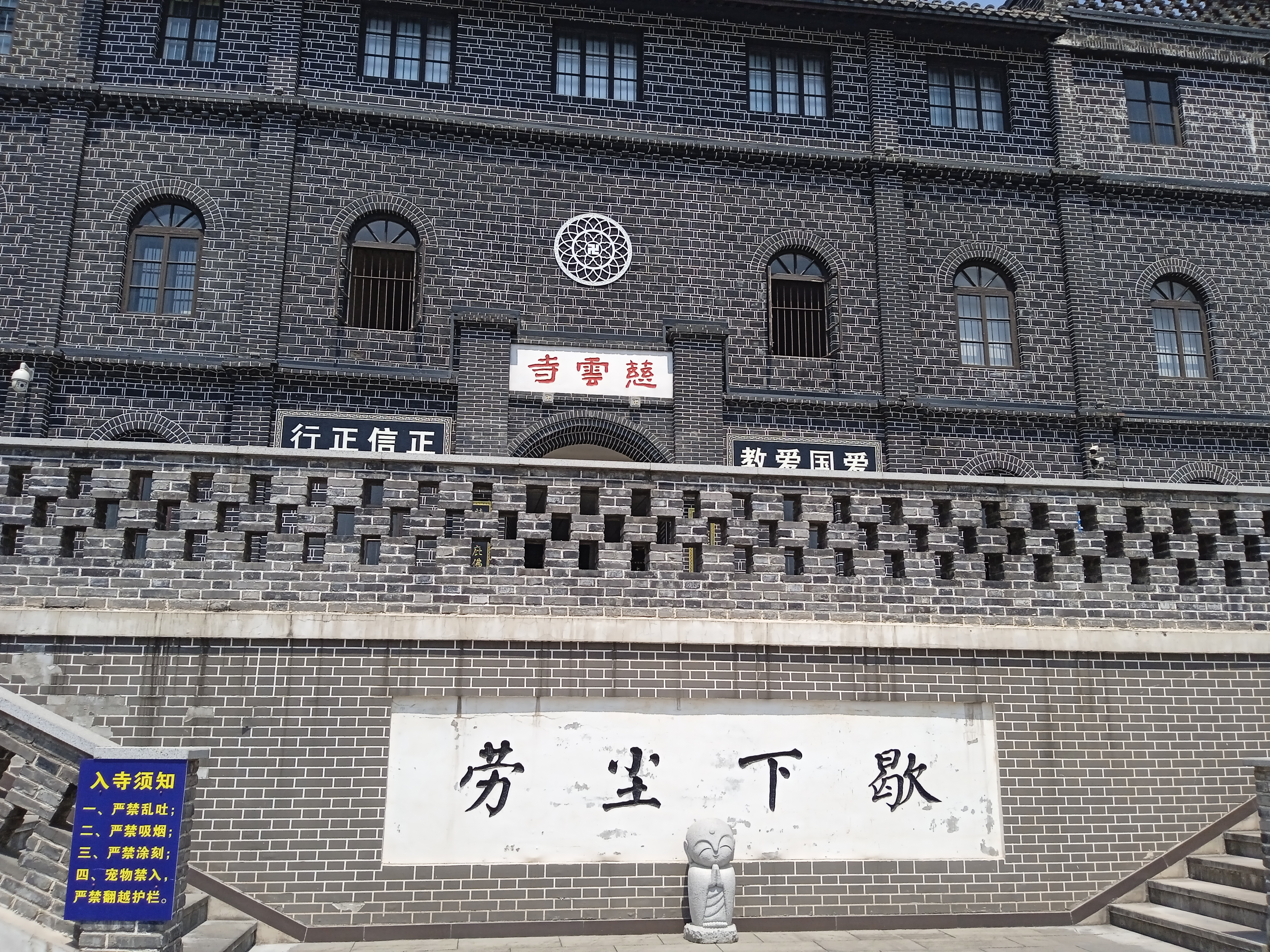
- Ciyun Temple

- Location within Chongqing

Religion
- Affiliation: Buddhism
- Sect: Chan Buddhism–Linji school
- Leadership: Zhengcheng (正澄)

Location
- Location: Nan'an District, Chongqing
- Country: China
- Coordinates: 29°34′19″N 106°36′04″E

Architecture
- Style: Chinese architecture
- Established: Tang dynasty (618–907)
- Completed: 1757 (reconstruction)

Ciyun Temple (simplified Chinese: 慈云寺; traditional Chinese: 慈雲寺; pinyin: Cíyún Sì) is a Buddhist temple located at the foot of Mount Lion (狮子山) in Nan'an District, Chongqing.

== History ==
The original temple dates back to the Tang dynasty (618–907). The modern temple was founded in 1757 during the reign of Qianlong Emperor in the Qing dynasty (1644–1911) and initially called "Temple of Guanyin" (观音庙). It was enlarged in 1927 by Chan master Yunyan (云岩) and would later become the "Ciyun Temple". Ciyun Temple has been designated as a National Key Buddhist Temple in Han Chinese Area by the State Council of China in 1983. A modern restoration of the entire temple complex was carried out in April 2016.

== Architecture ==
Now the existing main buildings include Shanmen, Heavenly Kings Hall, Mahavira Hall, Hall of Samantabhadra, Hall of Guanyin, Hall of Manjushri, etc. Most of the halls and rooms still maintain the architectural style of the Tang dynasty (618–907).

=== Mahavira Hall ===
The Mahavira Hall is the main hall in the temple. A 1.87-metre (6 ft 2 in) high and 1,500-kilogram (3,300 lb) weight jade statue of Sakyamuni is enshrined in the center of the hall. It was bought from Myanmar in 1931. It is one of the four largest jade statues of Sakyamuni in China. Statues of Eighteen Arhats lines up on both sides.
