= Shangchan Temple =

Buddhist temple in Anhui, China

- 上禅堂
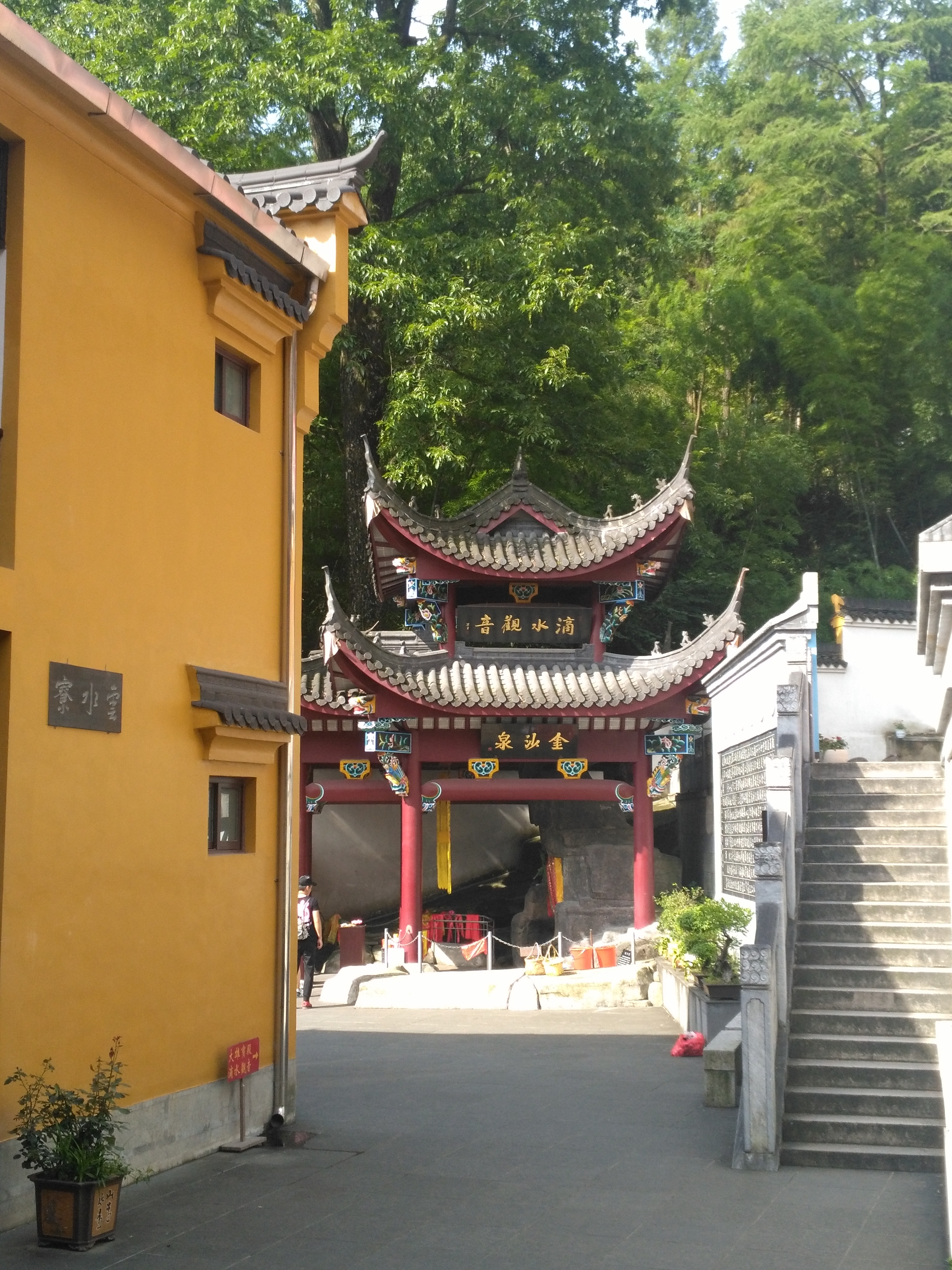

Religion
- Affiliation: Buddhism
- Sect: Chan Buddhism
- Leadership: Shi Guozhuo (释果卓)

Location
- Location: Mount Jiuhua, Qingyang County, Anhui
- Country: China
- Interactive map of Shangchan Temple
- Coordinates: 30°28′55″N 117°48′21″E

Architecture
- Style: Chinese architecture
- Founder: Zongyan (宗衍)
- Established: 1667
- Completed: 1862 (reconstruction)

Website
- www.jhssct.com

Shangchan Temple (simplified Chinese: 上禅堂; traditional Chinese: 上禪堂; pinyin: Shàngchán Táng) is a Buddhist temple located on Mount Jiuhua in Qingyang County, Anhui, China.

== History ==
=== Qing dynasty ===
The temple was first established by Zongyan (宗衍) in 1667, under the Qing dynasty (1644–1911). In 1758, in the reign of Qianlong Emperor (1736–1795), abbot Tianshi (忝石) added the Hall of Guanyin to the temple. It was devastated by war between the Qing army and the Taiping Rebellion during ruling of Xianfeng Emperor (1851–1861). In 1862 abbot Kaitai (开泰) renovated and refurbished it. In the Guangxu period (1875–1908), Chan master Qingyong (清镛) erected the Hall of Thousand Buddhas.

=== Republic of China ===
During the Republic of China in 1928, abbot Zhifang redecorated the Mahavira Hall.

=== People's Republic of China ===
After the founding of the Communist State in 1956, local government repaired the temple, but one year later, the Hall of Guanyin turned to ashes by a catastrophic fire. In 1983 it has been designated as National Key Buddhist Temple in Han Chinese Area by the State Council of China. A modern reconstruction of the entire temple complex was carried out in 1987.

== Architecture ==
The existing main buildings include the Shanmen, Four Heavenly Kings Hall, Mahavira Hall, Hall of Guanyin and Buddhist Texts Library.
