= National Key Buddhist Temples in Han Chinese Area =

- Traditional Chinese: 漢族地區佛教全國重點寺院
- Simplified Chinese: 汉族地区佛教全国重点寺院
Transcriptions
Standard Mandarin
- Hanyu Pinyin: Hánzú dìquū Fójiào quánguó zhòngdiǎn sìyuàn

National Key Buddhist Temples in Han Chinese Area are national key ("important") Buddhist temples in areas traditionally associated with the Han Chinese in the People's Republic of China (excluding Inner Mongolia, Tibet, and Xinjiang). The list was originally released on 9 April 1983 by the State Council, and included 142 Buddhist temples, of which all in the original list are listed below.

== List ==
=== North China ===
- Beijing: Guangji Temple, Fayuan Temple, Lingguang Temple, Guanghua Temple (Beijing), Tongjiao Temple, Yonghe Temple, Xihuang Temple
- Tianjin: Temple of Great Compassion
- Hebei:
  - Zhengding County: Linji Temple
  - Chengde: Puning Temple
- Shanxi:
  - Taiyuan: Chongshan Temple
  - Datong: Huayan Temple
  - Jiaocheng County: Xuanzhong Temple
  - Mount Wutai: Xiantong Temple, Tayuan Temple, Pusading, Shuxiang Temple, Luohou Temple, Jinge Temple, Guangzong Temple, Bishan Temple, Shifang Temple, Dailuoding, Xixian Temple

=== Northeast China ===
- Liaoning
  - Shenyang: Bore Temple, Ci'en Temple
- Jilin:
  - Changchun: Bore Temple, Dizang Temple
  - Jilin City: Guanyin Ancient Temple
- Heilongjiang
  - Harbin: Jile Temple

=== East China ===
- Shanghai: Jade Buddha Temple, Jing'an Temple, Longhua Temple, Chenxiang Pavilion, Yuanming Jiangtang
- Jiangsu:
  - Nanjing: Linggu Temple, Qixia Temple
  - Suzhou: Xiyuan Temple, Hanshan Temple, Lingyanshan Temple
  - Zhenjiang: Jinshan Temple, Dinghui Temple
  - Changshu: Tianning Temple (Changzhou), Xingfu Temple
  - Nantong: Guangjiao Temple
  - Yangzhou: Daming Temple, Gaomin Temple
  - Jurong: Longchang Temple
- Zhejiang:
  - Hangzhou: Lingyin Temple, Jingci Temple
  - Ningbo: Qita Temple, Tiantong Temple, Temple of King Ashoka
  - Xinchang County: Dafo Temple (Xinchang)
  - Mount Putuo: Puji Temple, Fayu Temple, Huiji Temple
  - Tiantai County: Guoqing Temple, Gaoming Temple, Fangguang Temple
  - Wenzhou: Jiangxin Temple
- Anhui:
  - Hefei: Mingjiao Temple
  - Anqing: Yingjiang Temple
  - Qianshan County: Sanzu Temple
  - Chuzhou: Langya Temple
  - Wuhu: Guangji Temple (Wuhu)
  - Mount Jiuhua: Huacheng Temple, Shrine of Living Buddha, Baisui Palace, Ganlu Temple, Zhiyuan Temple, Tiantai Temple, Zhantanlin, Huiju Temple, Shangchan Temple
- Shandong:
  - Jinan: Xingguo Temple
  - Qingdao: Zhanshan Temple

=== South East China ===
- Jiangxi:
  - Jiujiang: Nengren Temple, Donglin Temple (Jiangxi)
  - Yongxiu County: Zhenru Temple
  - Ji'an: Jingju Temple
- Fujian:
  - Fuzhou: Yongquan Temple, Xichan Temple, Linyang Temple, Dizang Temple
  - Minhou County: Chongsheng Temple
  - Xiamen: South Putuo Temple
  - Putian: Guanghua Temple (Putian), Cishou Temple, Guangxiao Temple (Putian)
  - Fuqing: Wanfu Temple
  - Quanzhou: Kaiyuan Temple
  - Jinjiang: Longshan Temple (Jinjiang)
  - Zhangzhou: Nanshan Temple (Zhangzhou)
  - Ningde: Huayan Temple.

=== South Central China ===
- Henan:
  - Luoyang: White Horse Temple
  - Dengfeng: Shaolin Temple
- Hubei:
  - Wuhan: Guiyuan Temple, Baotong Temple
  - Huangmei County: Wuzu Temple
  - Dangyang: Yuquan Temple
- Hunan:
  - Changsha: Lushan Temple, Kaifu Temple
  - Mount Heng: Zhusheng Temple, Fuyan Temple, Nantai Temple, Shangfeng Temple
- Guangdong:
  - Guangzhou: Temple of the Six Banyan Trees
  - Shaoguan: Nanhua Temple
  - Ruyuan County: Yunmen Temple
  - Zhaoqing: Qingyun Temple
  - Shantou: Lingshan Temple
  - Chaozhou: Kaiyuan Temple

=== Southwest China ===
- Guangxi:
  - Guiping: Xishi Temple.
- Chongqing: Luohan Temple, Ciyun Temple
  - Liangping County: Shuanggui Temple
- Sichuan:
  - Chengdu: Zhaojue Temple, Wenshu Temple, Baoguang Temple
  - Leshan: Wuyou Temple
  - Mount Emei: Baoguo Temple, Wannian Temple, Hongchunping Temple, Xixiang Chi, Jinding
- Guizhou:
  - Guiyang: Hongfu Temple, Qianming Temple
- Yunnan:
  - Kunming: Yuantong Temple, Qiongzhu Temple, Huating Temple
  - Binchuan County: Zhusheng Temple, Tongwadian.

=== Northwest China ===
- Shaanxi:
  - Xi'an: Daci'en Temple, Daxingshan Temple, Wolong Temple, Guangren Temple, Xingjiao Temple, Xiangji Temple, Jingye Temple
  - Hu County: Caotang Temple
- Ningxia:
  - Yinchuan: Temple of Haibao Pagoda
