= Huiju Temple =

Buddhist temple in Anhui, China

- 慧居寺

Religion
- Affiliation: Buddhism
- Sect: Chan Buddhism
- Leadership: Shi Daci (释大慈)

Location
- Location: Mount Jiuhua, Qingyang County, Anhui
- Country: China
- Interactive map of Huiju Temple
- Coordinates: 30°28′27″N 117°49′20″E

Architecture
- Style: Chinese architecture
- Established: Qing dynasty (1644–1911)
- Completed: 1982 (reconstruction)

Website
- www.huijusi.com

Huiju Temple (Chinese: 慧居寺; pinyin: Huìjū Sì) is a Buddhist temple located on the slope of Mount Jiuhua in Qingyang County, Anhui, China.

== History ==
The original temple was first established as "Huiqing'an" (慧庆庵) in the Qing dynasty (1644–1911), which was the last feudal dynasty in China, the modern temple was founded in 1938 by abbot Puming (普明) and initially called "Huiju Chan Temple" (慧居禅寺).

During the Second Sino-Japanese War, the Qingyang High School relocated to here and the temple was used as its campus.

After the 3rd Plenary Session of the 11th Central Committee of the Chinese Communist Party in 1982, the local government restored and refurbished the temple. In the following year, Huiju Temple was inscribed as a National Key Buddhist Temple in Han Chinese Area by the State Council of China.

In 1986, Wuchan (悟禅) was proposed as the new abbot of the temple. He supervised the reconstruction of Shanmen, Hall of Skanda, Hall of Guru, and Buddhist Texts Library.

== Architecture ==
The complex include the following halls: Shanmen, Mahavira Hall, Hall of Four Heavenly Kings, Hall of Guanyin, Bell tower, Drum tower, Hall of Guru, Dharma Hall, Buddhist Texts Library, etc.

=== Mahavira Hall ===
The Mahavira Hall is 12 metres (39 ft) long, 15 metres (49 ft) wide and 10 metres (33 ft) high. The hall enshrining the Three-Life Buddha, namely Sakyamuni, Amitabha and Bhaisajyaguru. In front of Sakyamuni stand Manjushri and Samantabhadra on the left and right.
