= Lingshan Temple (Shantou) =

Buddhist temple in Shantou, China

- 灵山寺

- Location within Guangdong Location within China

Religion
- Affiliation: Buddhism
- Sect: Chan Buddhism
- Leadership: Shi Yaoru (释耀瑜)

Location
- Location: Chaoyang District, Shantou, Guangdong
- Country: China
- Coordinates: 23°19′41″N 116°26′53″E

Architecture
- Style: Chinese architecture
- Founder: Chaozhou Dadian
- Established: 791
- Completed: 1706 (reconstruction)

Lingshan Temple (simplified Chinese: 灵山寺; traditional Chinese: 靈山寺; pinyin: Língshān Sì) is a Buddhist temple located in Chaoyang District, Shantou, Guangdong, China.

== History ==
=== Tang dynasty ===
This temple was built by a Chan master, Chaozhou Dadian, in 791, in the 7th year of the Zhenyuan period of the Tang dynasty (618–907). After studying Buddhism from Shitou Xiqian, Chaozhou Dadian came to Chaozhou, where he founded the original temple. In 819, Han Yu, a poet and writer, was publicly disgraced and sent into exile. Han Yu became a friend of Chaozhou Dadian and often came to talk with him. In 822, Emperor Muzong inscribed and honored the name "Lingshan Huguo Chan Temple" (灵山护国禅寺).

=== Song dynasty ===
In 1012, in the reign of Emperor Zhenzong of the Song dynasty (960–1279), monk Jueran (觉然) restored and redecorated the temple. It was renamed "Lingshan Kaishan Chan Temple" (灵山开善禅院) in 1029, during the reign of Emperor Renzong.

=== Ming dynasty ===
In 1369, at the dawn of the Ming dynasty (1368–1644), monk Kongshan (空山) refurbished the temple. Lingshan Temple was devastated in 1521 with only one hall and the Shanmen remaining.

In 1633, in the reign of the Chongzhen Emperor, magistrate Yang Zhuo (杨灼) supervised the reconstruction of Lingshan Temple.

=== Qing dynasty ===
In 1701, in the Kangxi era of the Qing dynasty (1644–1911), magistrate Peng Xiangsheng (彭象升) appropriated a large sum of money for constructing the temple. Under the leadership of Xinru (信如), the reconstruction was completed in 1706.

=== People's Republic of China ===
After the establishment of the Communist State in 1949, Lingshan Temple has been dilapidated by neglect.

During the ten-year Cultural Revolution, the red guards damaged the temple and caused massive losses of valuable cultural relics.

After the 3rd Plenary Session of the 11th Central Committee of the Chinese Communist Party, according to the national policy of free religious belief, monks returned to Lingshan Temple, and regular scripture lectures, meditation, and other features of temple spiritual practices were resumed.

Lingshan Temple has been inscribed as a National Key Buddhist Temple in Han Chinese Area by the State Council of China in 1983.

== Architecture ==
=== Thousand Buddha Pagoda ===
Square in shape, the octagonal-based Chinese pagoda has seven stories with a height of 19 metres (62 ft). It is made of granite. Over 1,000 niches with small statues of Buddha are carved on the body of the pagoda.
