= Bo're Temple (Shenyang) =

Buddhist temple in Liaoning, China

- 般若寺
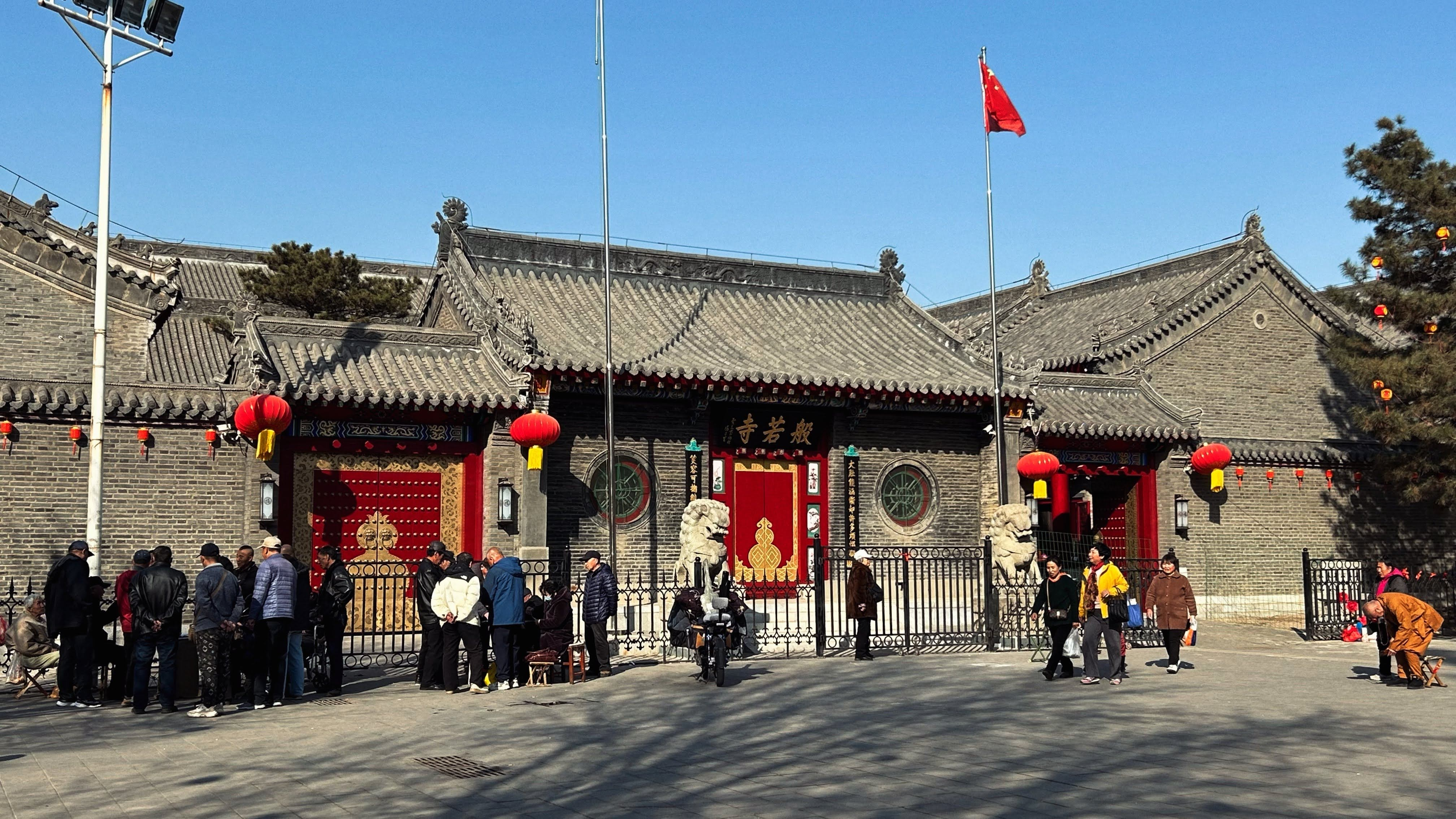

- Location within Liaoning Location within China

Religion
- Affiliation: Buddhism
- Sect: Chan Buddhism

Location
- Location: Shenhe District, Shenyang, Liaoning, China
- Coordinates: 41°47′19″N 123°27′57″E

Architecture
- Style: Chinese architecture
- Founder: Shi Gulin (释古林)
- Established: 1684
- Completed: 1924 (reconstruction)

The Bo're Temple (Chinese: 般若寺; pinyin: Bōrě Sì; lit. 'Prajna Temple') is a Buddhist temple located in Shenhe District of Shenyang, Liaoning, China. The temple occupies an area of 1,000-square-metre (11,000 sq ft) and the total area including temple lands, forests and mountains is over 3,600-square-metre (39,000 sq ft). It is a Bhikkhuni temple.

== History ==
The Bo're Temple was first established by monk Shi Gulin (释古林) in 1684, in the reign of Kangxi Emperor in the Qing dynasty (1644–1912). The temple has been rebuilt two times in 1909 and 1924 successively.

In 1966, Mao Zedong launched the Cultural Revolution, most parts of Bo're Temple were slightly damaged under the attack of the Red Guards.

After the 3rd Plenary Session of the 11th Central Committee of the Chinese Communist Party, according to the national policy of free religious belief, Bo're Temple reactivated its religious activities and was officially reopened to the public. In 1983, Bo're Temple was authorized as a National Key Buddhist Temple in Han Chinese Area by the State Council of China. The local government repaired and renovated the complex. Bo're Temple was designated as a municipal level cultural relic preservation organ in 1985 and a provincial level key cultural heritage in 2015.

== Architecture ==
The entire temple faces south and divided into two courtyards. The extant buildings include the Hall of Four Heavenly Kings, Mahavira Hall and Buddhist Texts Library.

=== Shanmen ===
There is a plaque under the eaves of Shanmen written by calligrapher Feng Ri'an: 冯日庵 ("Bo're Temple").

=== Hall of Four Heavenly Kings ===
The Maitreya Buddha, Skanda and Four Heavenly Kings' statues are enshrined in the Hall of Four Heavenly Kings.

=== Mahavira Hall ===
The Mahavira Hall is the second but most important hall in the temple. Statues of Sakyamuni (middle), Amitabha (left) and Bhaisajyaguru (right) are enshrined in the middle of the hall. At the back of their statues are paintings of Guanyin, Manjushri and Samantabhadra. In front of Sakyamuni stand Ananda and Kassapa Buddha, to the left and right. Stone rubbings of Sixteen Arhats hang on both sides of the hall. There is a plaque centered under the eaves of the hall written by calligrapher Huo Anrong: (霍安荣 (""Mahavira Hall").

=== Hall of Guru ===
The Hall of Guru was built in 1676. Paintings of 28 Buddhas are enshrined in the hall.
