= Baotong Temple =

Buddhist temple in Wuhan, China

- 宝通寺
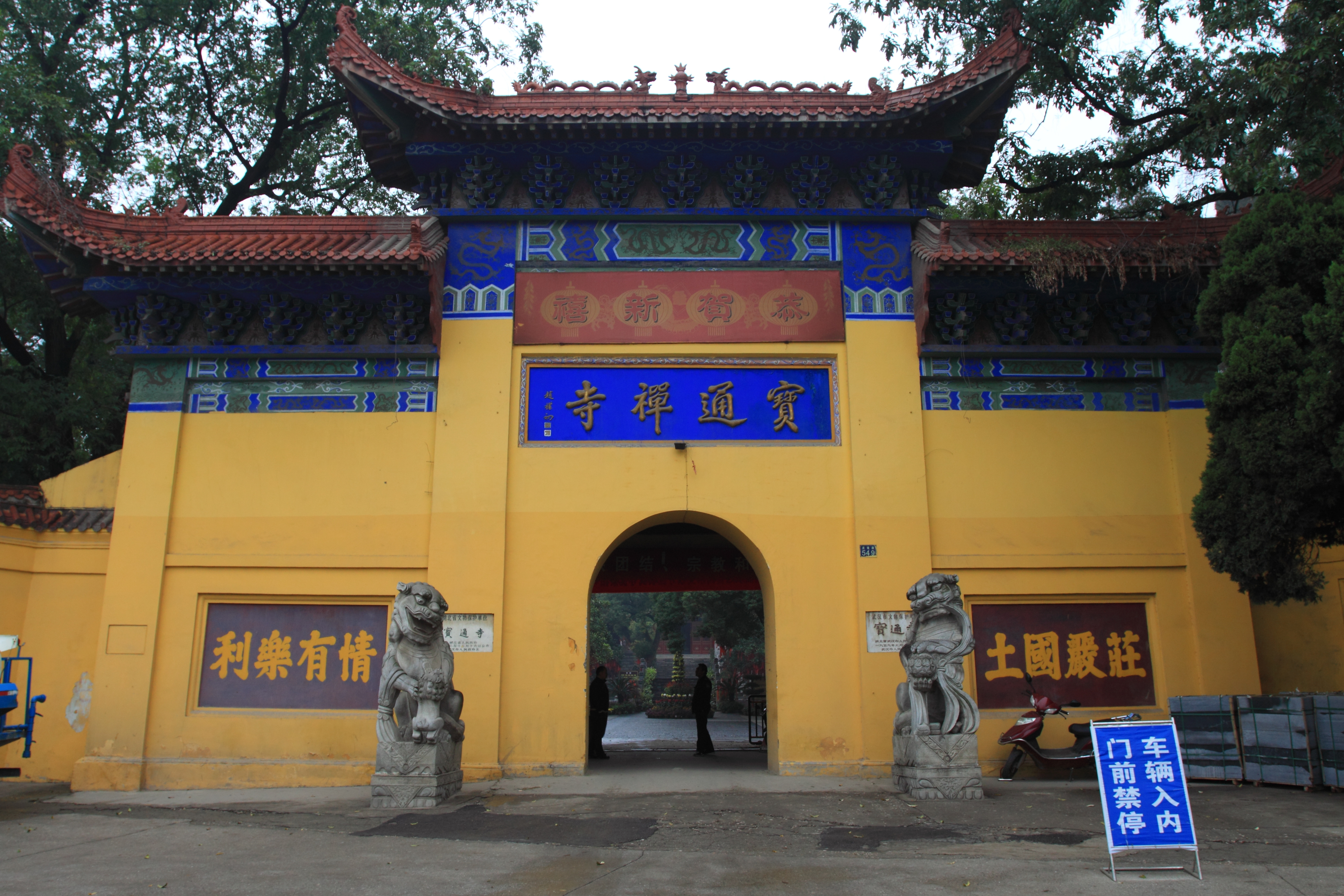
- The Shanmen of Baotong Temple.

- Location within Hubei Location within China

Religion
- Affiliation: Buddhism
- Sect: Chan Buddhism
- Leadership: Shi Longxing (释隆醒)

Location
- Location: Wuchang District, Wuhan, Hubei
- Country: China
- Interactive map of Baotong Temple
- Coordinates: 30°32′12″N 114°20′51″E

Architecture
- Style: Chinese architecture
- Established: Liu Song dynasty (420–479)

Baotong Temple (simplified Chinese: 宝通寺; traditional Chinese: 寶通寺; pinyin: Bǎotōng Sì) is a Buddhist temple located on the south hillside of Mount Hong, in Wuchang District of Wuhan, Hubei, China. It is one of the "Four Buddhist Temples" in Wuhan.

== History ==
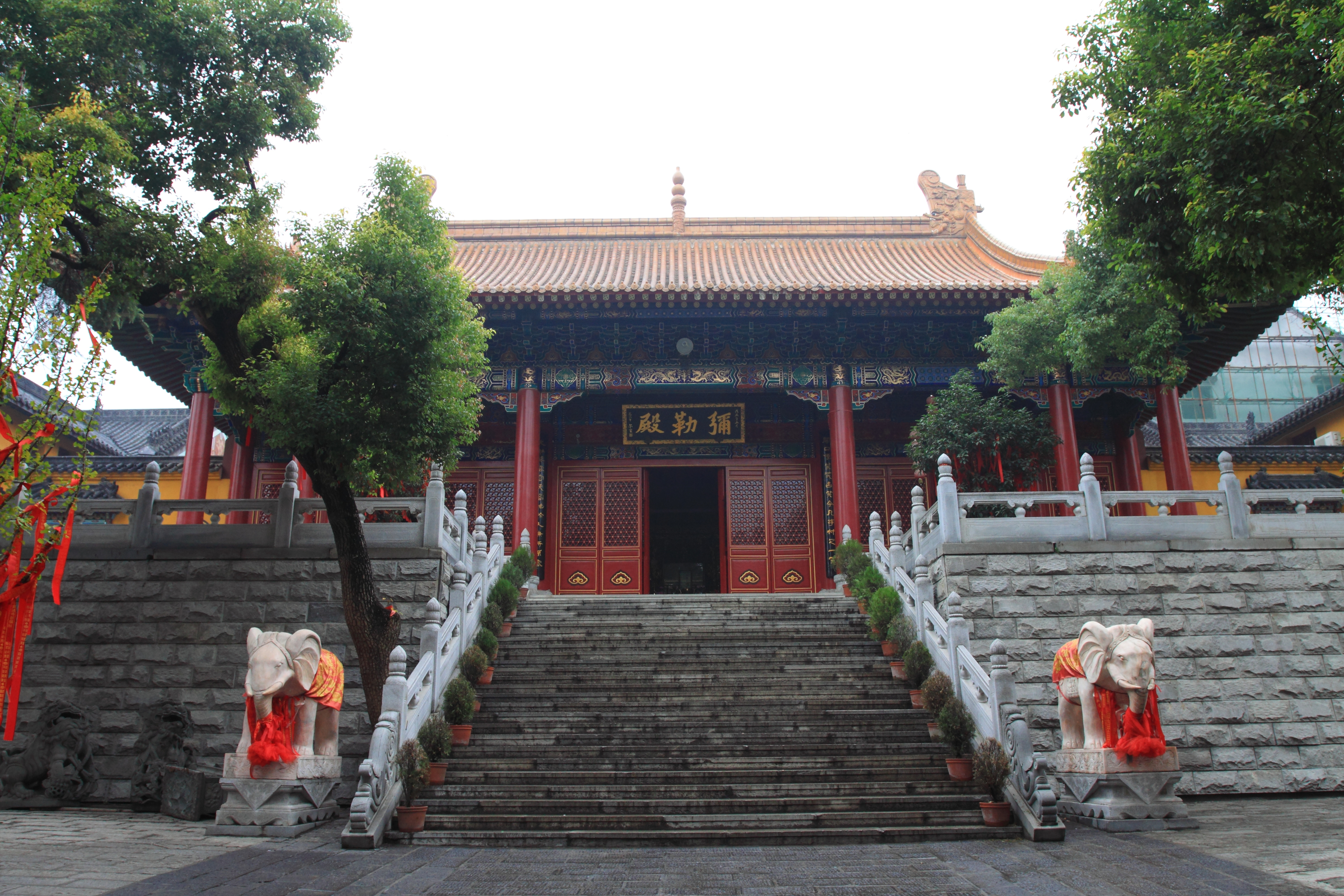
The Hall of Maitreya.

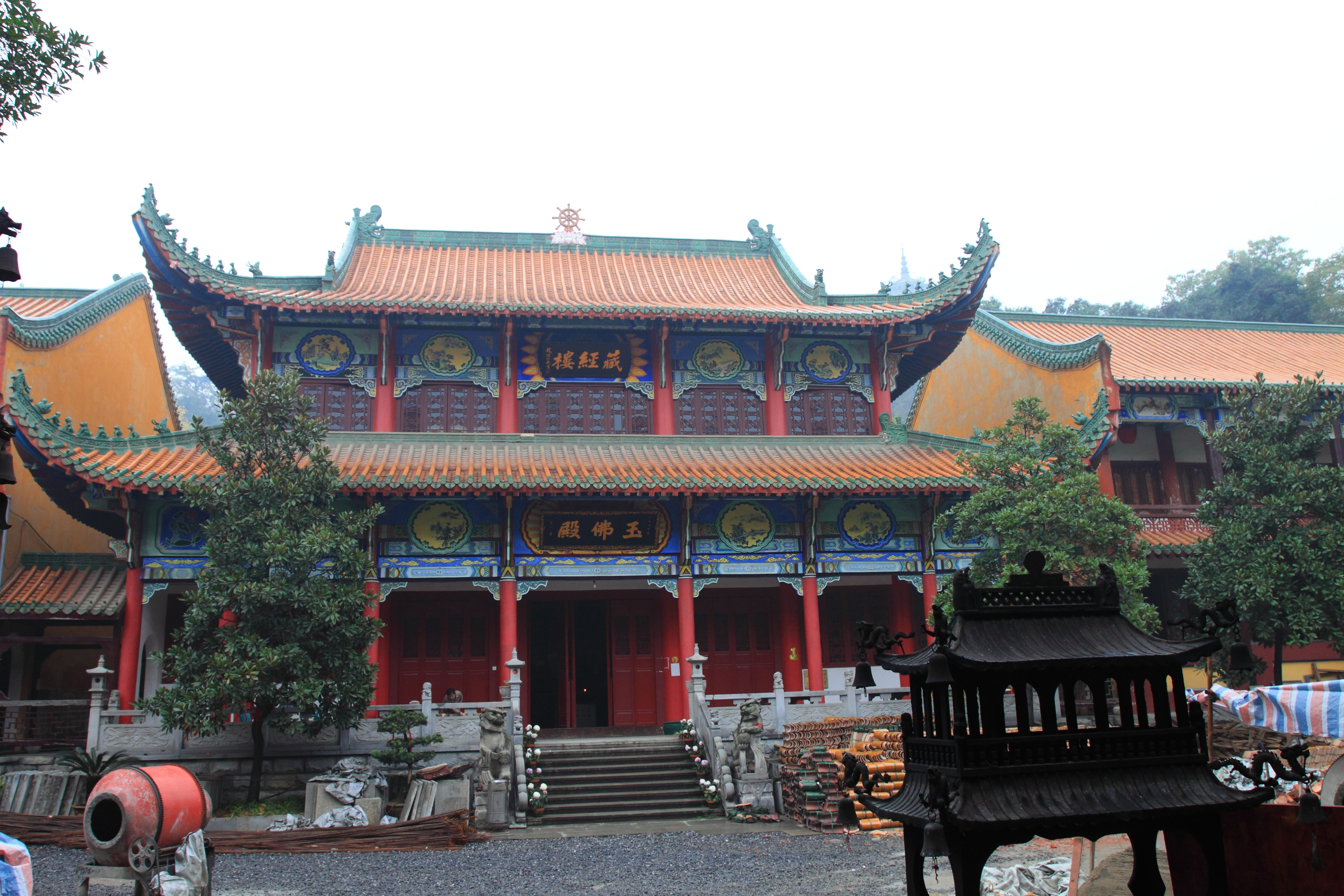
The Hall of Jade Buddha.

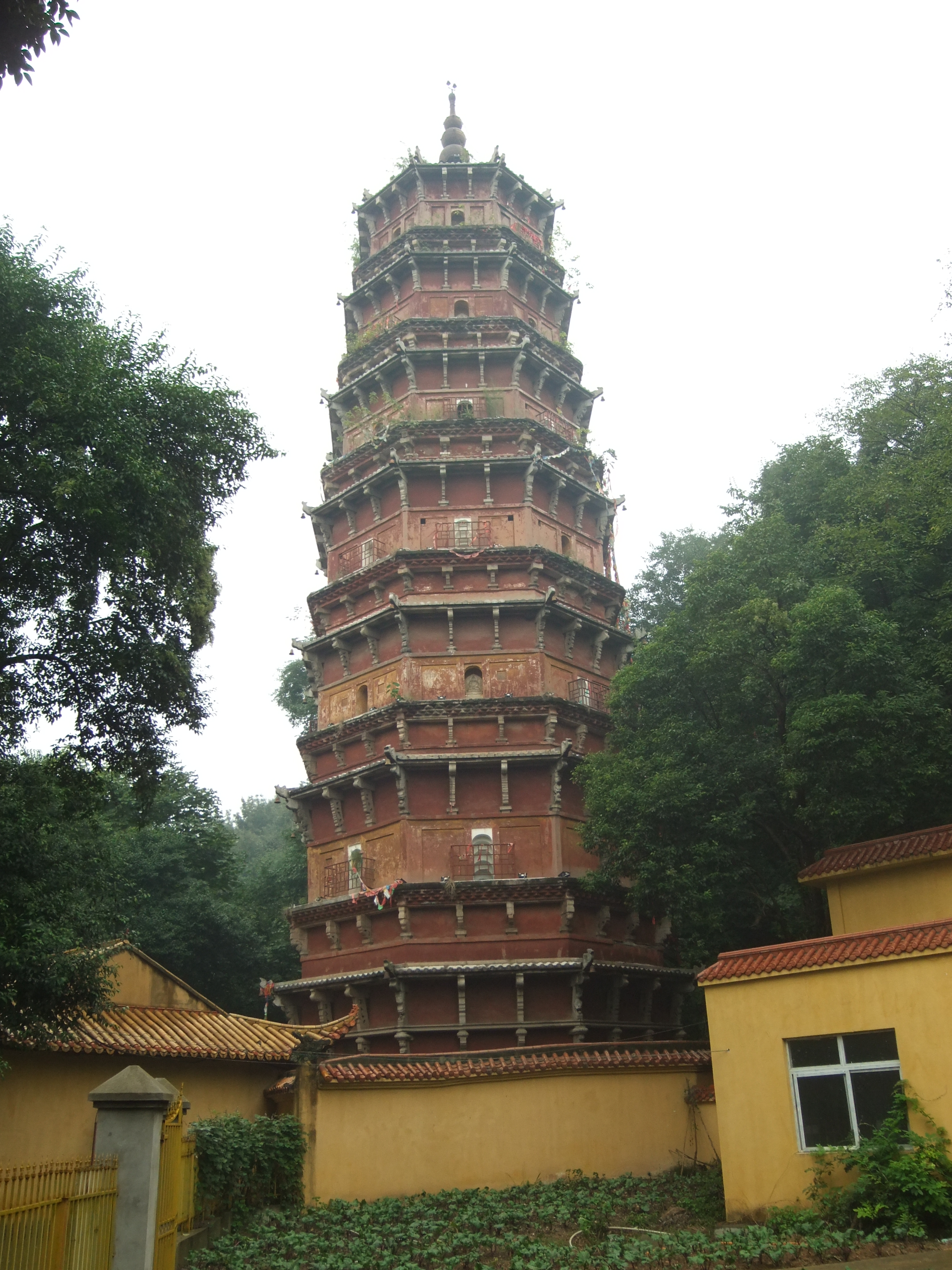
Hongshan Pagoda.

=== Northern and Southern dynasties ===
The temple was first built in the Liu Song dynasty (420–479) with the name of "Dongshan Temple" (东山寺; 'Eastern Mountain Temple') and was renamed "Mituo Temple" (弥陀寺; 'Maitreya Temple') in the reign of Emperor Taizong of the Tang dynasty (618–907).

=== Song dynasty ===
In the Duanping period (1234–1236) of the Song dynasty (960–1279), Emperor Lizong honored the name "Chongning Wanshou Chan Temple" (崇宁万寿禅寺)

=== Yuan dynasty ===
In the Yuan dynasty (1271–1368), a seven-storey Chinese pagoda was built.

=== Ming dynasty ===
In 1381, in the 14th year of Hongwu period in the Ming dynasty (1368–1644), Zhu Zhen, a son of Hongwu Emperor, restored the temple on Mount Hong. The Mahavira Hall was added in 1457 by Prince Zhu Jun'e (朱均讹). Baotong Temple was largely extended in 1485 and its name was changed into "Baotong Chan Temple" (宝通禅寺), which is still in use now.

=== Qing dynasty ===
Baotong Temple underwent three renovations in the Qing dynasty (1644–1911), respectively in the ruling of Kangxi Emperor (1676), in the reign of Qianlong Emperor (1792) and in the Tongzhi and Guangxu periods (1865–1879). In the heyday of the temple, it had more than 1,500 monks.

=== Republic of China ===
In 1911, during the Xinhai Revolution, the revolutionary army were here to garrison. Then Cheng Qian donated property to repair the temple but it was demolished by wars soon.

In 1932, abbot Wenxian (问贤) refurbished and redecorated the temple.

On November 24, 1935, the President Li Yuanhong's surpassing ceremony was held in Baotong Temple.

=== People's Republic of China ===
After the founding of the Communist State in 1952, Wuhan Municipal Government has allocated a large sum of money for constructing the temple. During the disastrous Cultural Revolution, all Buddha images were destroyed and resident monks were forcefully disrobed. A pair of exquisite stone lions from Ming dynasty were also destroyed.

Baotong Temple has been inscribed as a National Key Buddhist Temple in Han Chinese Area by the State Council of China in 1983.

In 1994, the Wuchang Buddhist College was elected in Baotong Temple.

The Mahavira Hall was completed in April 2005.

== Architecture ==
Now the existing main buildings include Shanmen, Heavenly Kings Hall, Mahavira Hall, Hall of Guru, Free Life Pond, Jade Buddha Hall, Meditation Hall, Dharma Hall, Hall of Maitreya, Reception Hall, etc.

=== Hongshan Pagoda ===
Construction to the Hongshan Pagoda began in 1280 and was completed in 1291 during the Yuan dynasty (1271–1368), in memory of the prominent monk Lingji Ciren (灵济慈忍). It initially called "Lingji Pagoda" (灵济塔) and renamed "Baotong Pagoda" (宝通塔) in 1485 during the Ming dynasty (1368–1644). Because it is located on Mount Hong, the pagoda is also known as the "Hongshan Pagoda" (洪山塔; 'Pagoda of Mount Hong'). The seven-story, 44.1-metre-tall (145 ft), octagonal-based pagoda is made of brick and stone. Its pedestal is 37.3 metres (122 ft) wide. The pagoda features a facade of doors and windows, as well as columns, rafters, and brackets.
