= Chenxiang Pavilion =

Buddhist nunnery in Shanghai, China

- 沉香阁
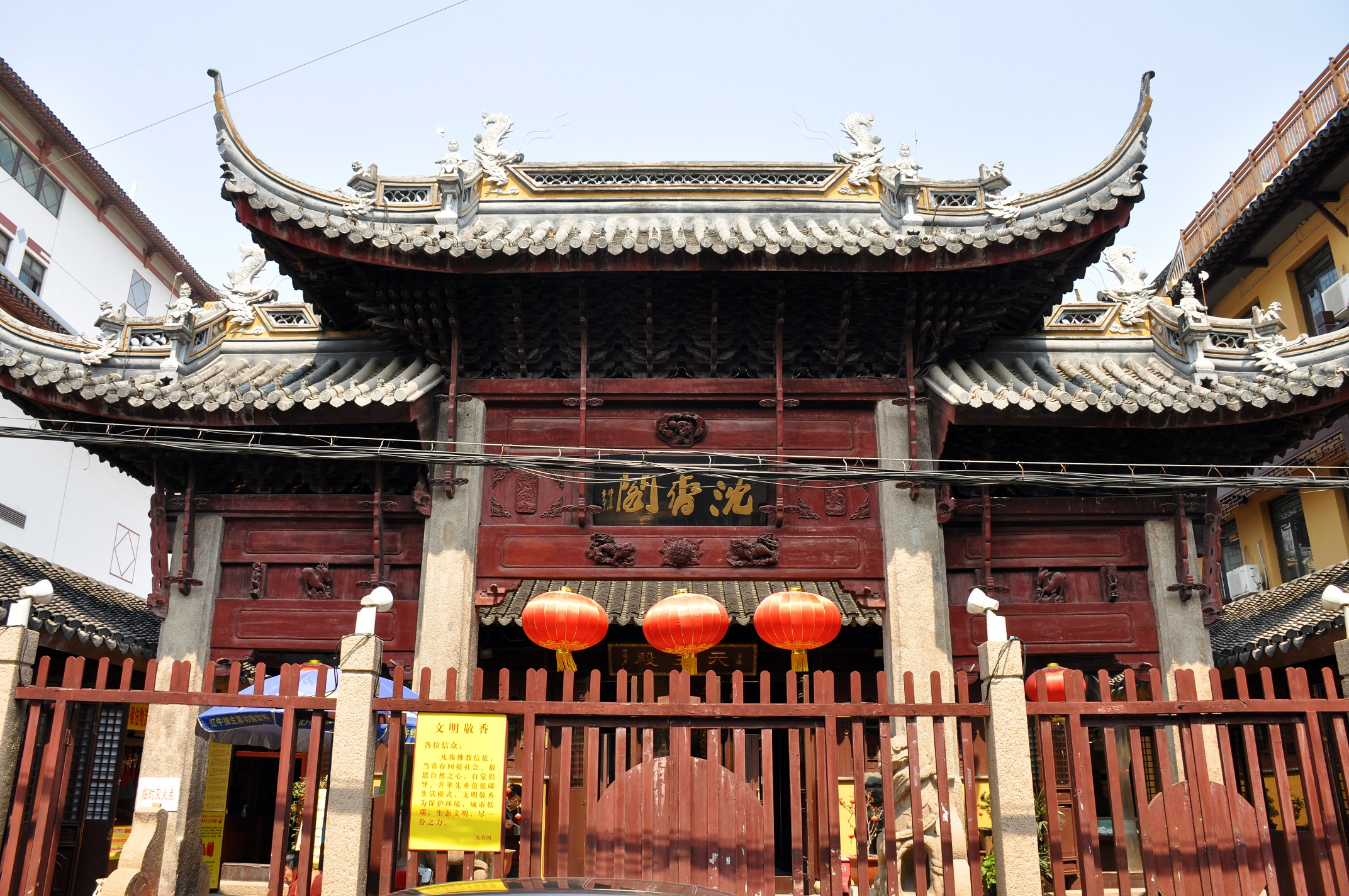
- Entrance of Chenxiang Pavilion.

- Location within Shanghai

Religion
- Affiliation: Buddhism
- Sect: Chan Buddhism
- Leadership: Shi Dinghui (释定慧)

Location
- Location: Huangpu District, Shanghai
- Country: China
- Coordinates: 31°13′58″N 121°29′46″E

Architecture
- Style: Chinese architecture
- Founder: Pan Yunduan (潘允端)
- Established: 1600
- Completed: 1815 (reconstruction)

Chenxiang Pavilion or Chenxiangge Nunnery (simplified Chinese: 沉香阁; traditional Chinese: 沉香閣; pinyin: Chénxiāng Gé) is a Buddhist temple located in the Huangpu District of Shanghai. It is currently serving as a nunnery for Buddhist nuns.

== History ==
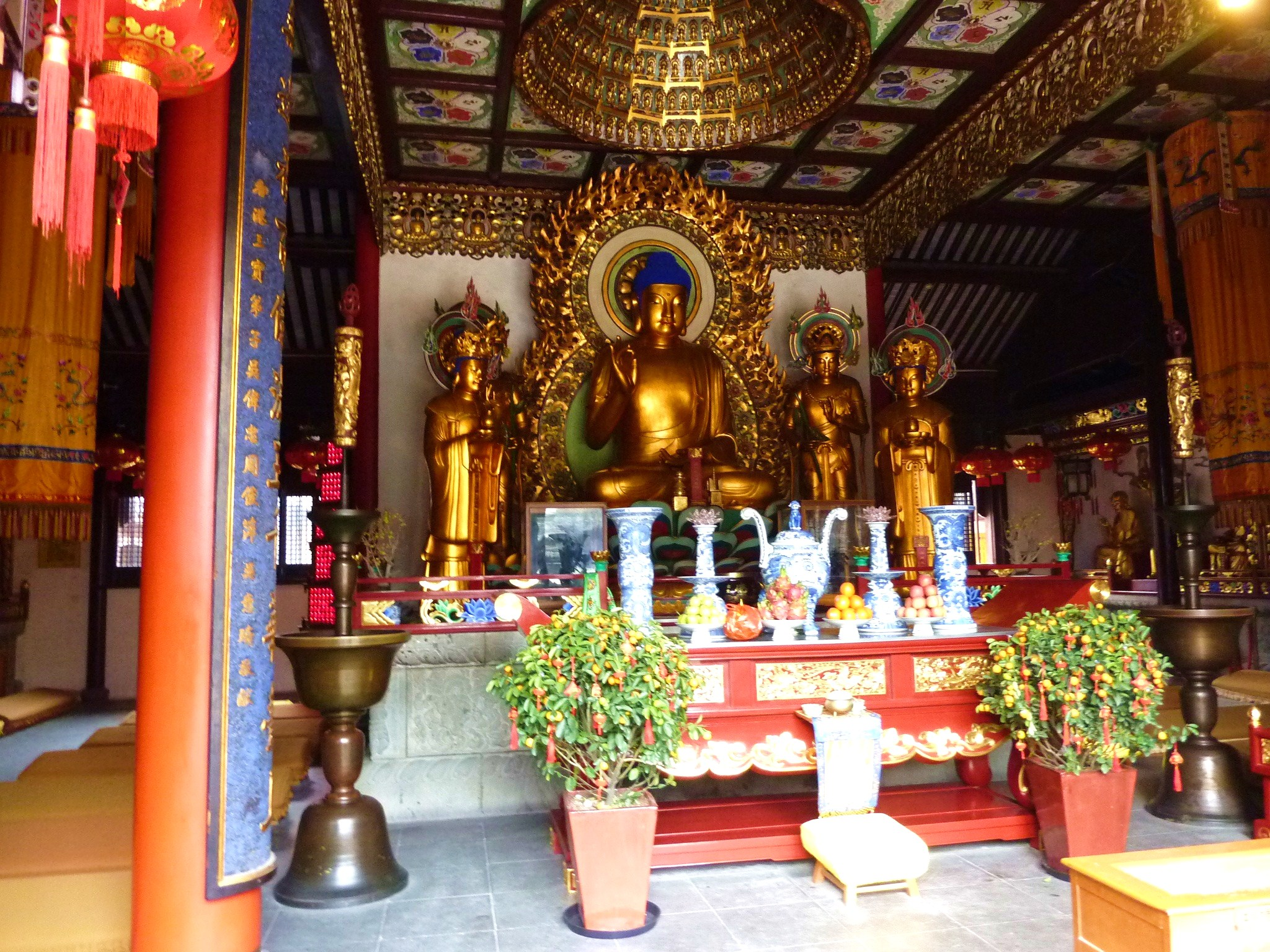
Statue of Sakyamuni at the temple.

The temple was first established by an official named Pan Yunduan (潘允端) in 1600, under the rule of Wanli Emperor in the late Ming dynasty (1368–1644), the current temple was founded in 1815 during the Qing dynasty (1644–1911) and initially called "Ciyun Chan Temple" (慈云禅院).

On May 26, 1959, Chenxiang Pavilion was inscribed to the Shanghai Municipal Cultural Preservation Unit List by the Shanghai Municipal Government.

In 1966, Mao Zedong launched the ten years Cultural Revolution, the red guards attacked the temple and Chenxiang Pavilion was dilapidated with huge losses of the religious and cultural relics, including a Ming dynasty exquisite wooden statue of Guanyin. Then The temple was used as a factory.

Chenxiang Pavilion has been designated as a National Key Buddhist Temple in Han Chinese Area by State Council of China in 1983.

On November 20, 1996, it was listed among the fourth batch of "Major National Historical and Cultural Sites in Shanghai" by the State Council of China.

== Architecture ==
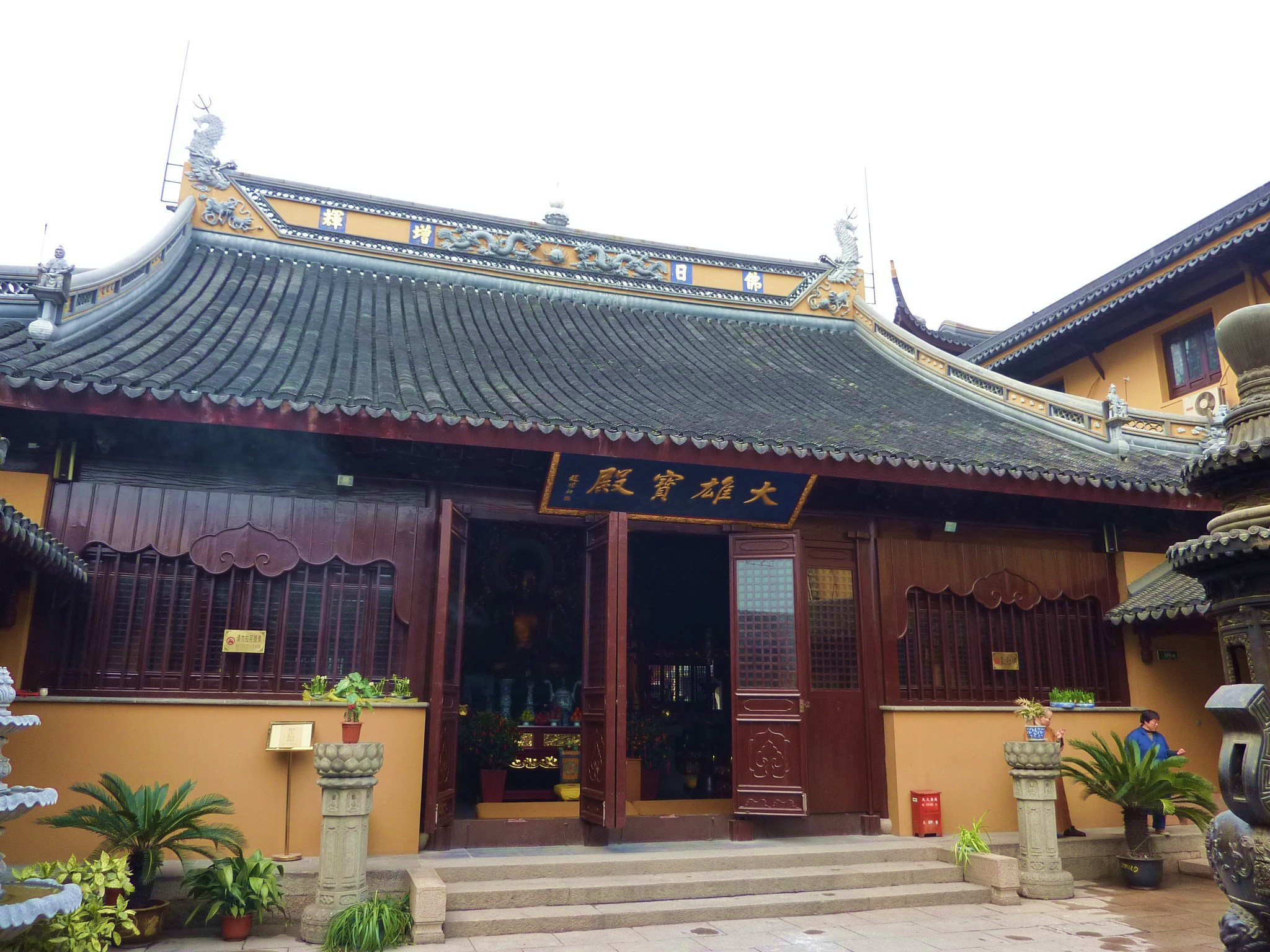
The Mahavira Hall at the temple.

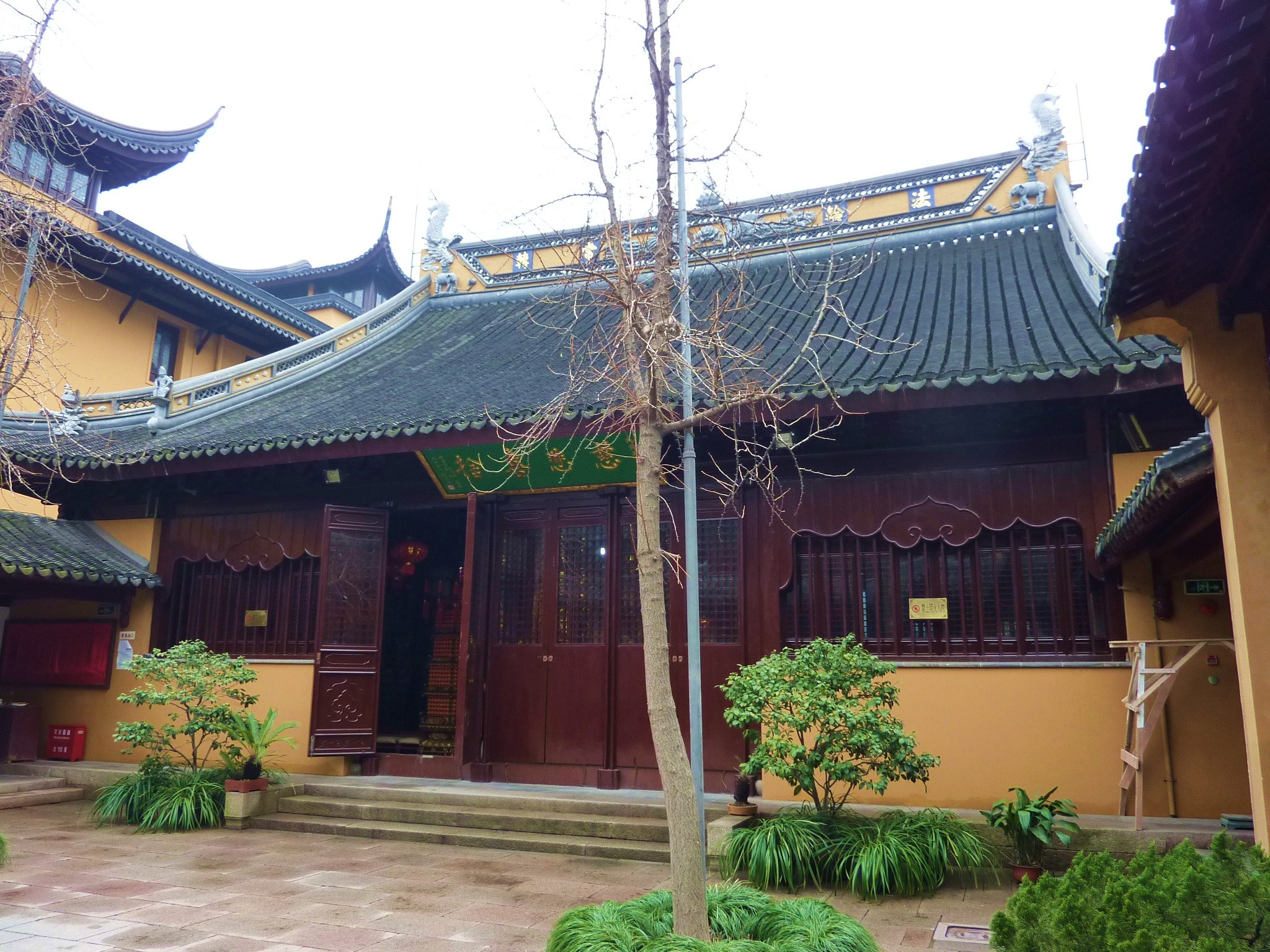
A hall at the temple.

The temple occupies a total area of 2,378 square metres (25,600 sq ft). The extant structure is based on the Qing dynasty (1644–1911) building principles and retains the traditional architectural style. Main structures from the Shanmen to the Hall of Guanyin are aligned with the central axis and divided into three courtyards. At the very front is Paifang, followed by the Four Heavenly Kings Hall, Mahavira Hall, and finally Hall of Guanyin in the rear. On both sides of the central axis are Hall of Dharma Protectors and Memorial Hall of Master Yingci (应慈法师纪念堂).

=== Hall of Four Heavenly Kings ===
Maitreya is enshrined in the Hall of Four Heavenly Kings and at the back of his statue is a statue of Skanda. Statues of Four Heavenly Kings are enshrined in the left and right side of the hall.

=== Mahavira Hall ===
The Mahavira Hall enshrining the Three Saints of Hua-yan (华严三圣). In the middle is Sakyamuni, statues of Manjushri and Samantabhadra stand on the left and right sides of Sakyamuni's statue. Statues of Brahma and Indra are placed on both sides of statues of Manjushri and Samantabhadra. At the back of the hall enshrines the statue of Guanyin with Shancai standing on the left and Longnü on the right. The statues of Eighteen Arhats sitting on the seats before both sides of the gable walls.

=== Hall of Guanyin ===
A 1-metre (3 ft 3 in) high wood carving statue of Guanyin is placed in the middle of the hall. The original statue was carved in 1600 during the Ming dynasty (1368–1644) but was completely destroyed during the ten-year devastating cultural revolution. The present version was presented by Hong Kong Buddhist devotees.

=== Hall of Dharma Protectors ===
The Hall of Dharma Protectors (伽蓝殿), for the worship of Lord Guan, a famous general during the Three Kingdoms era and honoured as the protector of Sangharama.
