= Tongjiao Temple =

Buddhist temple in Beijing, China

Tongjiao
- 通教寺
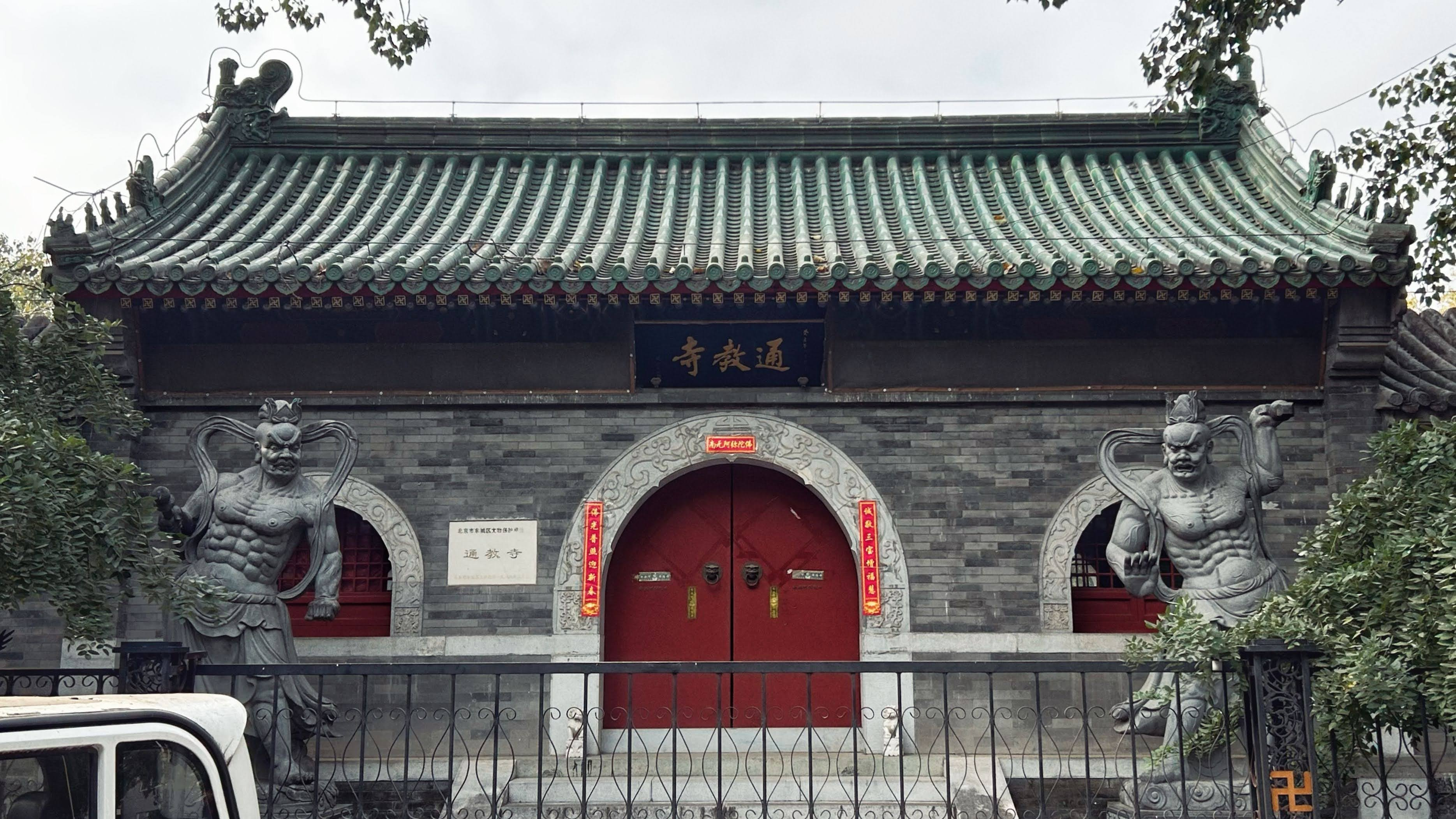
- Tongjiao Temple, Beijing

- Location within Beijing Location within Beijing

Religion
- Affiliation: Buddhism
- Sect: Pure Land Buddhism

Location
- Location: Dongcheng District, Beijing
- Country: China
- Coordinates: 39°57′02″N 116°25′58″E

Architecture
- Style: Chinese architecture
- Founder: An eunuch
- Established: Ming dynasty (1368–1644)

Tongjiao Temple (Chinese: 通教寺; pinyin: Tōngjiào Sì) is a Buddhist temple located in Dongcheng District of Beijing. It covers an area of 700 square metres (7,500 sq ft). Currently it is the only Bhikkhuni temple in Beijing. It was inscribed to the National Key Buddhist Temples in Han Chinese Area's list in 1983.

== History ==
Tongjiao Temple was first established by an eunuch in the Ming dynasty (1368–1644). The modern temple was founded in the Qing dynasty (1644–1911), initially called "Tongjiao Chanlin" (通教禅林), and it served as a practice center for Bhikkhuni.

At the dawn of the Republic of China (1912-1949), the temple became dilapidated due to neglect. In 1941, they only had a Bhikkhuni named Yinhe (印和). In 1942, eminent Bhikkhuni Cizhou's (慈舟) disciples Kaihui (开慧), Tongyuan (通愿) and Shengyu (胜雨) began to rebuild the temple. The South Hall, North Hall, Recitation Hall, and Wuguan Hall were added to the temple. The temple was renamed "Tongjiao Temple". They founded "Bajing Xueyuan" (八敬学苑), a Buddhist school which became well-known at that time.

In 1956, in order to avoid the vigorous movement of socialism in Beijing at that time, Kaihui and Tongyuan moved to Mount Wutai, where Kaihui died in the mid-1960s.

During the Cultural Revolution, the Red Guards had attacked the temple. Buddhist statues and Buddhist scriptures were destroyed and Bhikkhuni were forced to resume secular life.

After the 3rd plenary session of the 11th Central Committee of the Chinese Communist Party, according to the national policy of free religious belief, Tongjiao Temple was reopened and rebuilt soon.

In 1983, Tongjiao Temple was listed among the first group of the National Key Buddhist Temple in Han Chinese Area by the State Council of China.

In January 1984, Tongjiao Temple was categorized as a municipal level key cultural heritage in Beijing.

== Architecture ==
Tongjiao Temple has more than 10 buildings. The complex includes the following halls: Shanmen, Mahavira Hall, Hall of Sangharama Palace, Reception Hall, Dining Hall, Hall of Guru, and Bedrooms.
