= Dailuoding =

Buddhist temple in Taihuai, China

- 黛螺顶
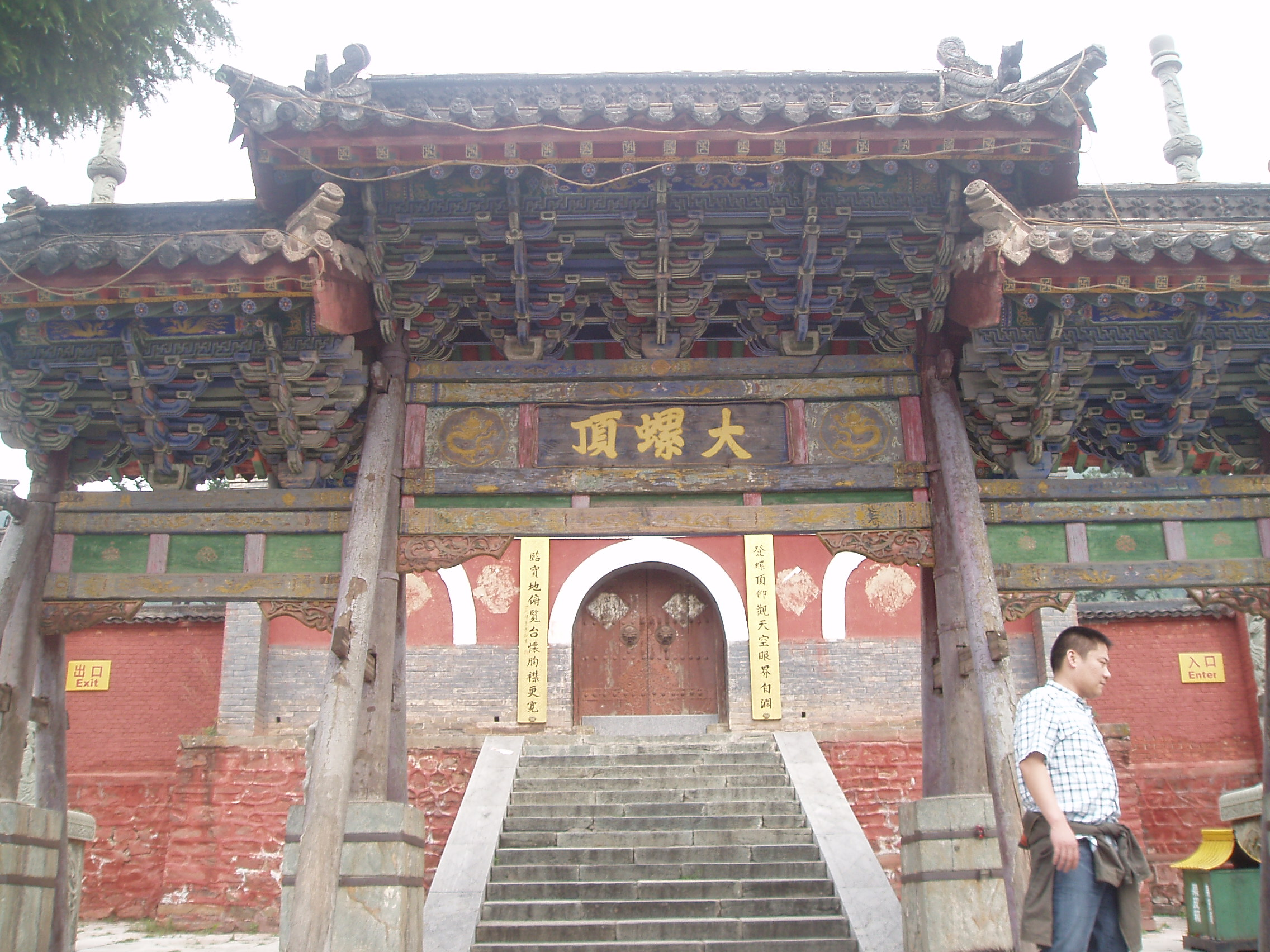
- A paifang at Dailuoding.

- Location within Shanxi Location within China

Religion
- Affiliation: Buddhism
- Sect: Chan Buddhism
- Leadership: Changshan (昌善)

Location
- Location: Mount Wutai, Wutai County, Shanxi
- Country: China
- Interactive map of Dailuoding
- Coordinates: 39°00′55″N 113°36′50″E

Architecture
- Style: Chinese architecture
- Established: Tang dynasty (618–907)
- Completed: Qing dynasty (reconstruction)

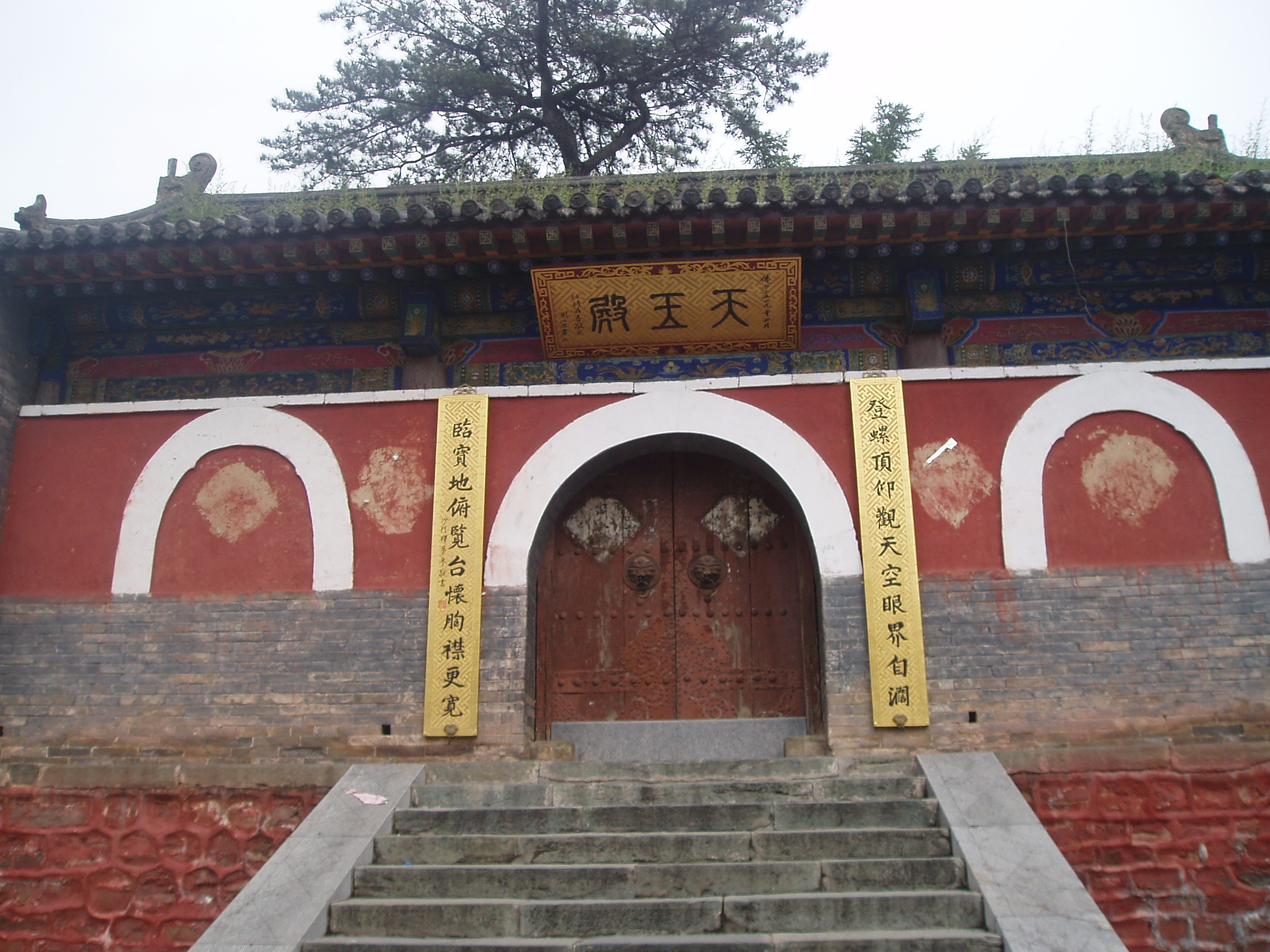
The Four Heavenly Kings Hall.

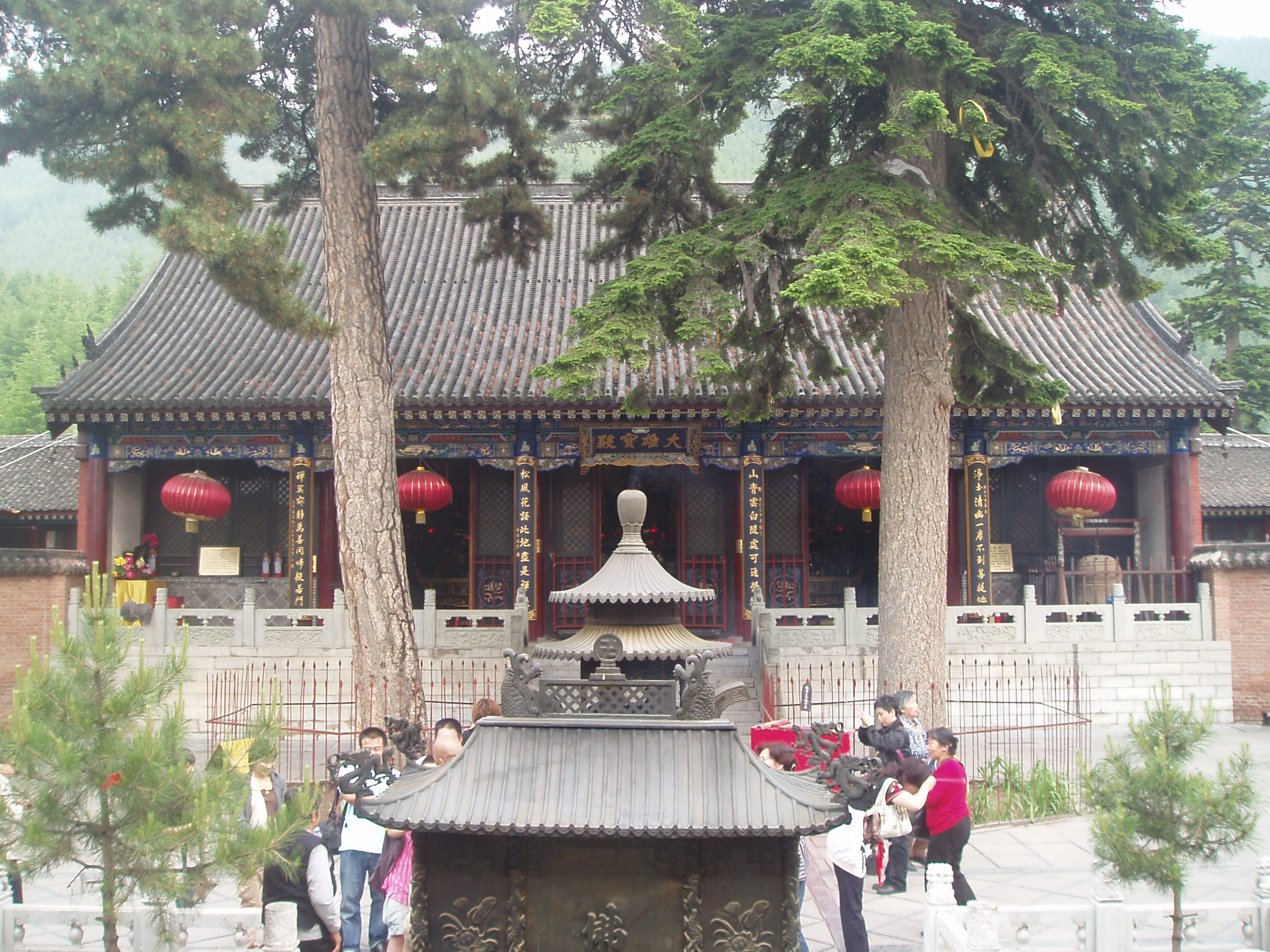
The Mahavira Hall.

Dailuoding (simplified Chinese: 黛螺顶; traditional Chinese: 黛螺頂; pinyin: Daìluódǐng) is a Buddhist temple located on Mount Wutai of Taihuai Town, in Wutai County, Shanxi, China. The temple has been listed among the first group of National Key Buddhist Temples in Han Chinese Area in 1983.

== History ==
According to the Records of Mount Qingliang, the temple was originally called "Foding'an" (佛顶庵; 'Buddha Summit Temple') in the Tang dynasty (618–907) and changed to "Daluoding" (大螺顶) in 1592 during the Wanli era of the Ming dynasty (1368–1644). In 1750, in the region of Qianlong Emperor of the Qing dynasty (1644–1911), the temple was renamed "Dailuoding" (黛螺顶) which is still in use now.

== Architecture ==
The temple is built along the hillside. Along the central axis of the temple stand five buildings including the Paifang, Four Heavenly Kings Hall, Danchan Hall, Manjushri Hall and Mahavira Hall.

=== Manjushri Hall ===
The Manjushri Hall is 16.5 metres (54 ft) wide and 11 metres (36 ft) deep with a single eave gable and hip roof (单檐歇山顶). Five statues of Manjushri with different appearance enshrined in the hall. In the spring of 1750, Qianlong Emperor visited Mount Wutai and wrote a poem to eulogize the hall.

=== Mahavira Hall ===
Behind the Manjushri Hall is the Mahavira Hall enshrining the statues of Sakyamuni, Amitabha and Bhaisajyaguru. The two disciples' statues are placed in front of the statue of Sakyamuni, the older is called Kassapa Buddha and the middle-aged is called Ananda. The statues of Eighteen Arhats stand on both sides of the hall.
