= Xichan Temple (Fujian) =

Buddhist temple in Fuzhou, Fujian, China

- 西禅寺
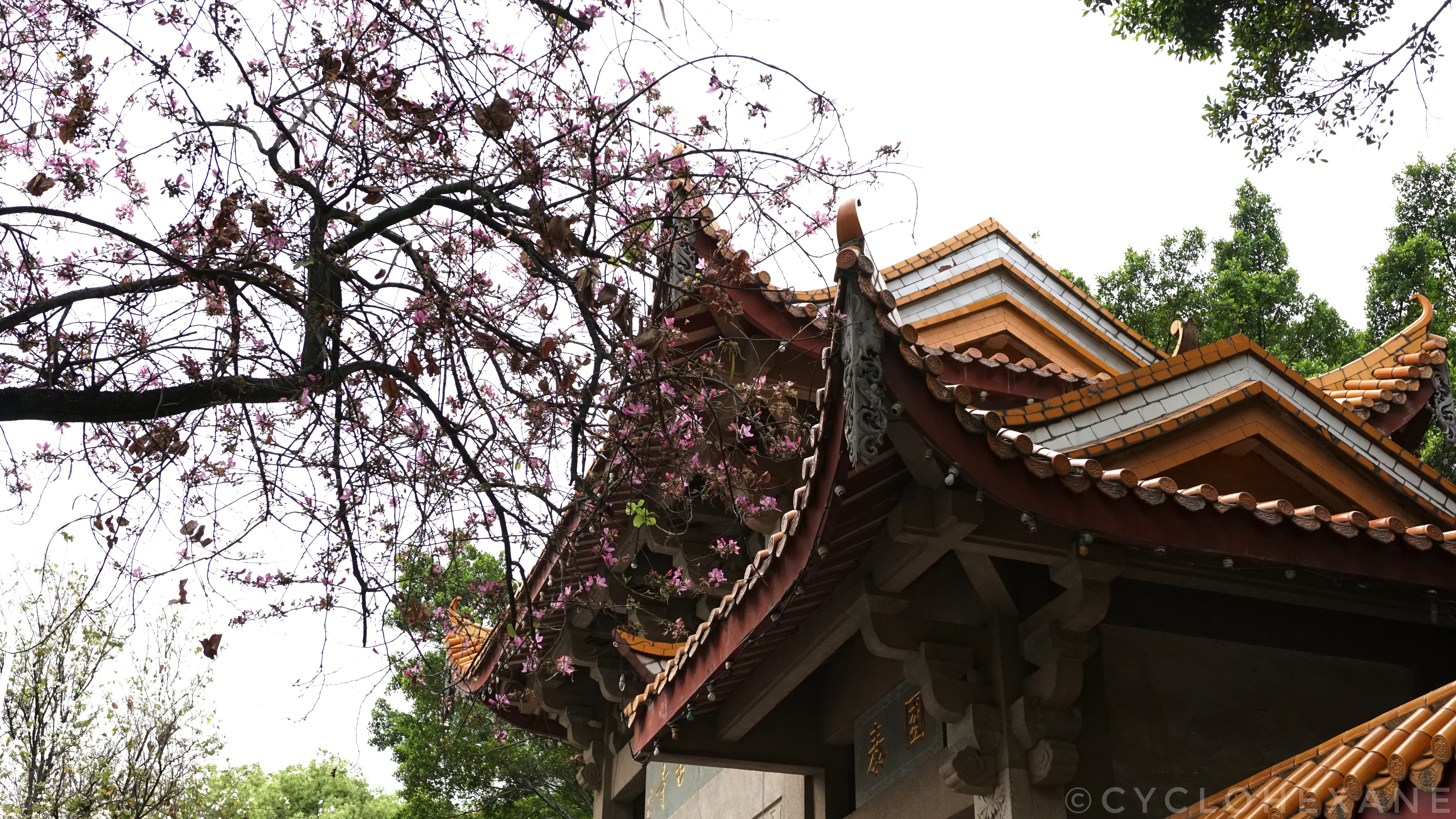
- A hall at Xichan Temple.

- Location within Fujian

Religion
- Affiliation: Buddhism
- Sect: Chan Buddhism

Location
- Location: Gulou District, Fuzhou, Fujian
- Country: China
- Coordinates: 26°4′29.50″N 119°16′16.36″E

Architecture
- Style: Chinese architecture
- Founder: Da'an (大安)
- Established: 867
- Completed: 20th century (reconstruction)

Xichan Temple (simplified Chinese: 西禅寺; traditional Chinese: 西禪寺; pinyin: Xīchán Sì) is a Buddhist temple located on the slope of Mount Yi (怡山), in Gulou District, Fuzhou, Fujian.

== History ==
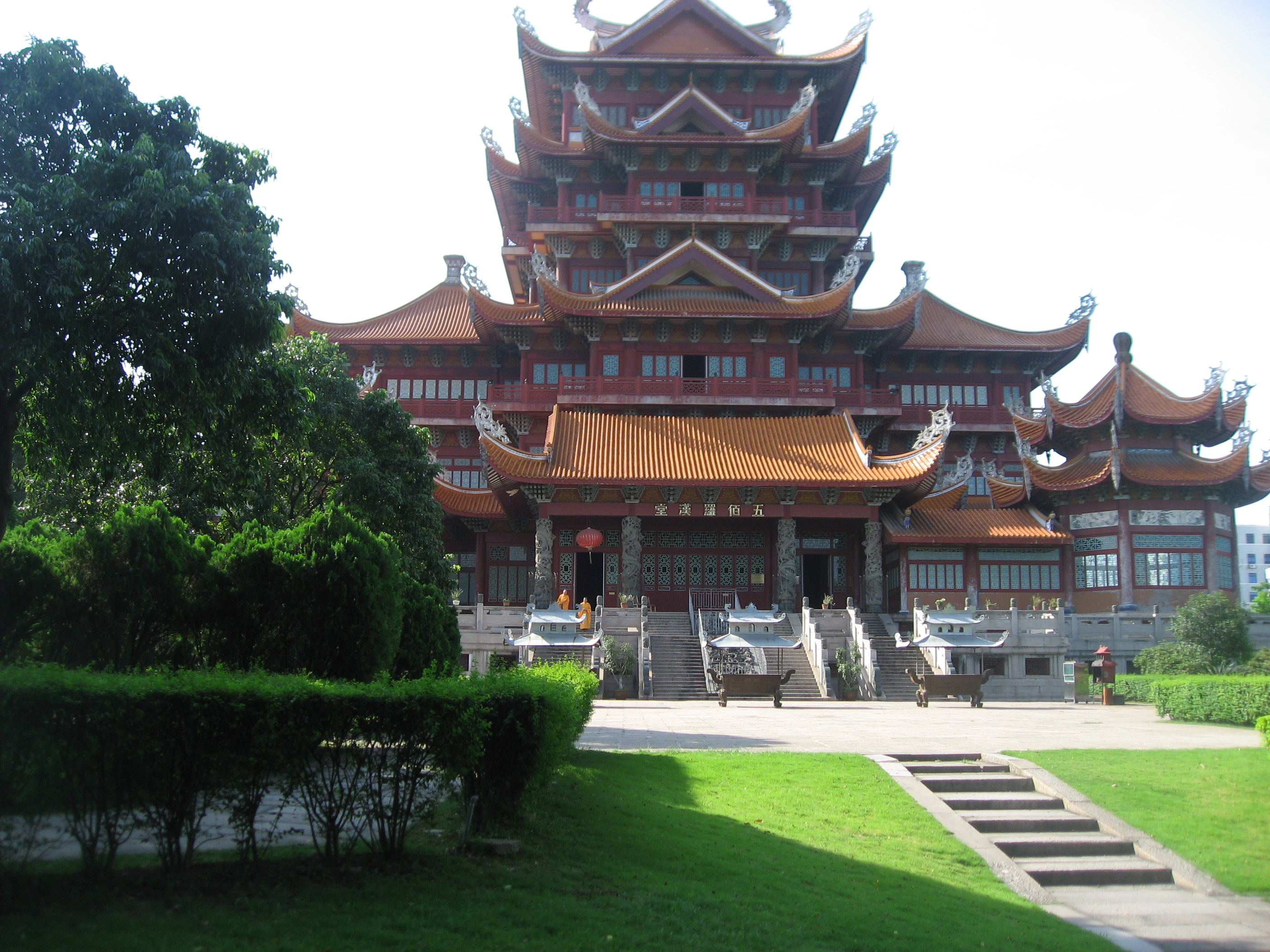
Hall of Five Hundred Arhat.

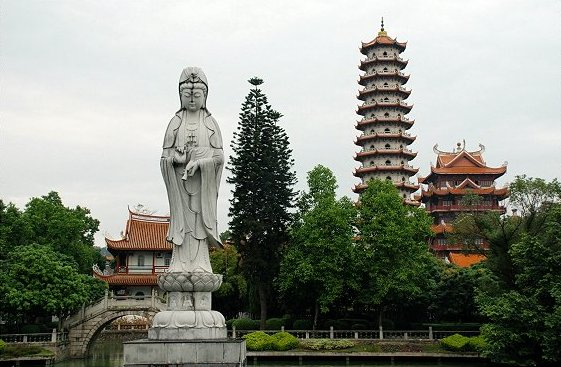
Statue of Guanyin in front of Xichan Temple.

=== Tang dynasty ===
The original temple dates back to 867, in the reign of Emperor Yizong (860–874) of Tang dynasty (618–907).

=== Five Dynasties and Ten Kingdoms ===
In 933, under the Five Dynasties and Ten Kingdoms (907–960), the temple was renamed "Changqing Temple" (长庆寺).

=== Song dynasty ===
The temple underwent two renovations in the Song dynasty (960–1279), respectively in the ruling of Emperor Renzong (1023–1063) and in the reign of Emperor Lizong (1225–1264).

=== Yuan dynasty ===
In 1349 in the Mongolian-ruling Yuan dynasty (1271–1368), monks refurbished and redecorated the temple.

=== Ming dynasty ===
In 1437, in the 2nd year of Zhengtong period (1436–1449) in the Ming dynasty (1368–1644), monk Dingxin (定心) supervised the reconstruction of Xichan Temple.

In 1637, in the 10th year of Chongzhen era (1628–1644) of the late Ming dynasty, monk Mingliang (明梁) renovated the temple.

=== Qing dynasty ===
In the reign of Guangxu Emperor (1875–1908) of the Qing dynasty (1644–1911), master Weimiao (微妙) headed the temple, he raised funds to restore it. Mahavira Hall, Dharma Hall and Hall of Four Heavenly Kings were gradually rebuilt.

=== Republic of China ===
In 1937, after the Marco Polo Bridge Incident, the Second Sino-Japanese War broke out. Xichan Temple was devastated by war between the Nationalists and the Imperial Japanese Army.

=== People's Republic of China ===
After the establishment of the Communist State in 1949, local government restored and redecorated the temple.

In 1966, Mao Zedong launched the ten-year Cultural Revolution, the Red Guards had attacked the temple, volumes of sutras, historical documents, statues of Buddha, and other works of art were either removed, damaged or destroyed in the massive movement.

After the 3rd Plenary Session of the 11th Central Committee of the Chinese Communist Party, according to the national policy of free religious belief, Xichan Temple was officially reopened to the public in 1979.

Xichan Temple has been inscribed as a National Key Buddhist Temple in Han Chinese Area by the State Council of China in 1983.
