= Xishi Temple =

Buddhist temple in Xishan Town, China

- 洗石庵

- Location within Guangxi Location within China

Religion
- Affiliation: Chan Buddhism
- Leadership: Shi Changhui (释昌慧)

Location
- Location: Xishan Town, Guiping, Guangxi
- Country: China
- Interactive map of Xishi Temple
- Coordinates: 23°24′13″N 110°03′56″E

Architecture
- Style: Chinese architecture
- Established: 1646

Xishi Temple (Chinese: 洗石庵; pinyin: Xǐshí Ān) is a Buddhist temple located in Xishan Town of Guiping, Guangxi, China. Xishi Temple was listed among the National Key Buddhist Temple in Han Chinese Area in 1983. It is a renowned Bhikkhuni temple in southwest China's Guangxi Zhuang Autonomous Region. Xishi Temple is known for the Xishan Tea (西山茶; 'Western Mountain Tea'), which have been exported to many countries and regions over the world.

== History ==
Xishi Temple was built in the year 1646 at the nascent Qing dynasty (1644-1911). Xishi Temple was restored and renovated in both Yongzheng and Qianlong periods. The present version was completed in 1809 in the Jiaqing period.

In 1983, Xishi Temple was classified as a National Key Buddhist Temple in Han Chinese Area by the State Council of China.

== Architecture ==
Occupying an area of 1,021 square metres (10,990 sq ft), Xishi Temple has more than ten buildings. The most important halls include the Shanmen, Mahavira Hall, Three-Saint Hall, Jade Buddha Hall, Guanyin Hall, and Faxiang Hall (法相堂).

=== Mahavira Hall ===
The Mahavira Hall is the main hall of the temple. The statue of Sakyamuni is enshrined in the center with Manjushri and Samantabhadra standing on both sides.
