= Dizang Temple (Changchun) =

Buddhist temple in Changchun, China

- 地藏寺
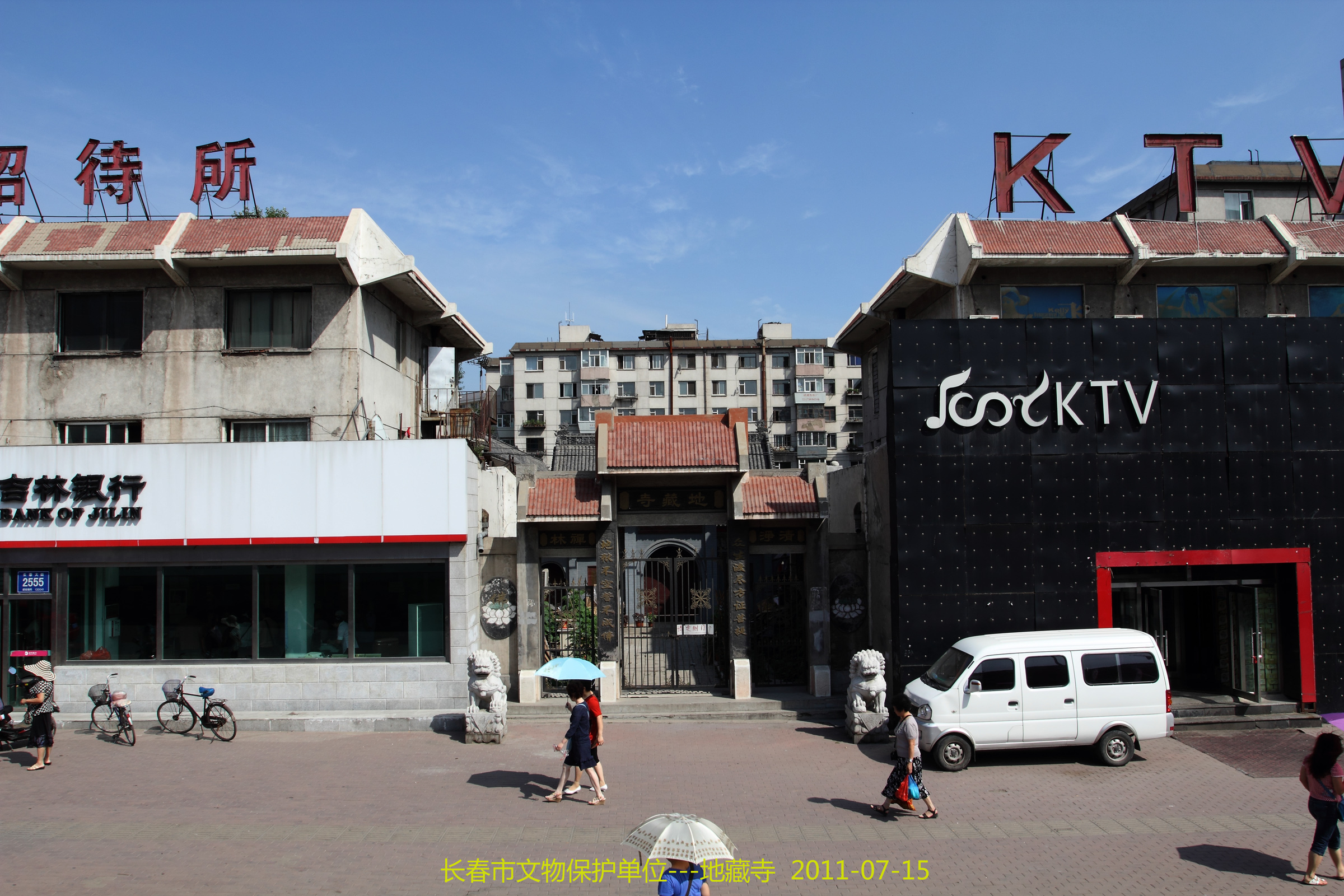

- Location within Jilin Location within China

Religion
- Affiliation: Buddhism
- Sect: Chan Buddhism
- Leadership: Shi Anhong (释安宏)

Location
- Location: Nanguan District, Changchun, Jilin, China
- Interactive map of Dizang Temple
- Coordinates: 43°54′11″N 125°21′36″E

Architecture
- Style: Chinese architecture
- Founder: Zuyuan (祖圆)
- Established: 1926
- Completed: 1938 (reconstruction)

Dizang Temple (Chinese: 地藏寺; pinyin: Dìzàng Sì; lit. 'Temple of Ksitigarbha') is a Buddhist temple located in Nanguan District of Changchun, Jilin, China. Dizang Temple is named after Kṣitigarbha, one of the "Four Bodhisattva in Chinese Buddhism". The temple is a Bhikkhuni temple.

== History ==
Dizang Temple was first established in 1926 by Bhikkhuni Zuyuan (祖圆). In 1937, after the Marco Polo Bridge Incident broke out, the temple moved to the present site and was completed in 1938.

In 1956 and 1964, the local government refurbished the temple.

In 1966, Mao Zedong launched the Cultural Revolution, the Red Guards had attacked the temple, statues of Buddha were smashed and the building were used as a factory attached to No. 101 Middle School.

After the 3rd Plenary Session of the 11th Central Committee of the Chinese Communist Party, according to the national policy of free religious belief, Dizang Temple reactivated its religious activities.

Dizang Temple has been inscribed to the National Key Buddhist Temples in Han Chinese Area List in 1983.

In July 2002, the temple was designated as a municipal level cultural heritage by the Changchun Municipal Government.

== Architecture ==
Now the existing buildings of Dizang Temple are the Shanmen, Hall of Four Heavenly Kings, Mahavira Hall, Hall of Kṣitigarbha and Buddhist Texts Library.

=== Hall of Four Heavenly Kings ===
The Maitreya Buddha, Skanda and Four Heavenly Kings' statues are enshrined in the Hall of Four Heavenly Kings.

=== Mahavira Hall ===
The Mahavira Hall is the main hall in the temple enshrining the statues of Sakyamuni, Guanyin and Kṣitigarbha. Ananda and Kassapa Buddha stand on both left and right side of the statue of Sakyamuni.

== Abbot ==
Shi Anhong (释安宏) is the abbot of Dizang Temple. She was born Zhang Yujie (张玉杰) on March 26, 1967, in Changchun, Jilin, received ordination as a Bhikkhuni in 1978, and graduated from Wanshilian Buddhist College in Xiamen, Fujian in 1988.
