= Dizang Temple (Fuzhou) =

Buddhist nunnery in Fuzhou, China

- 地藏寺

- Location within Fujian Location within China

Religion
- Affiliation: Buddhism
- Sect: Caodong school

Location
- Location: Fuzhou, Fujian
- Country: China
- Interactive map of Dizang Temple
- Coordinates: 26°05′54″N 119°19′35″E

Architecture
- Style: Chinese architecture
- Established: 527
- Completed: 19th century (reconstruction)

Dizang Temple (Chinese: 地藏寺; pinyin: Dìzàng Sì; lit. 'Temple of Kṣitigarbha') is a Buddhist temple located in Fuzhou, Fujian, China. It is currently a well-known nunnery for Buddhist nuns of Caodong school.

== History ==
=== Imperial China ===
Originally built in 527 during the reign of Emperor Wu of the Liang dynasty (502–557), it was called "Falin Bhiksuni Temple" (法林尼寺). The temple was restored in 894, in the 1st year of Qianning period of the Tang dynasty (618–907). It was renamed "Bao'en Temple" (报恩寺) in the mid-5th century during the Five Dynasties (907–979). After the reconstruction in 1864 in the Tongzhi era of the Qing dynasty (1644–1911), its name was changed to "Dizang Temple" (地藏寺).

=== Modern China ===
During the Republic of China, it became a nunnery of Pure Land Buddhism. During the devastating Cultural Revolution, the red guards attacked the temple and nuns. The Buddhist nuns were forced to disrobe and the nunnery was turned into a factory. After the 3rd plenary session of the 11th Central Committee of the Chinese Communist Party, according to the national policy of free religious belief, the temple was finally allowed to resume its religious activities. Dizang Temple has been designated as a National Key Buddhist Temple in Han Chinese Area by the State Council of China in 1983.

== Architecture ==
Now the existing main buildings include Shanmen, Heavenly Kings Hall, Mahavira Hall, Dabei Hall (Hall of Great Compassion), Kṣitigarbha Hall, Maitreya Hall, Skanda Hall, Guanyin Hall, Reception Hall, Dining Hall, etc.
