= Tang Yongtong =

Chinese educator, philosopher, and scholar of Chinese Buddism

- 湯用彤
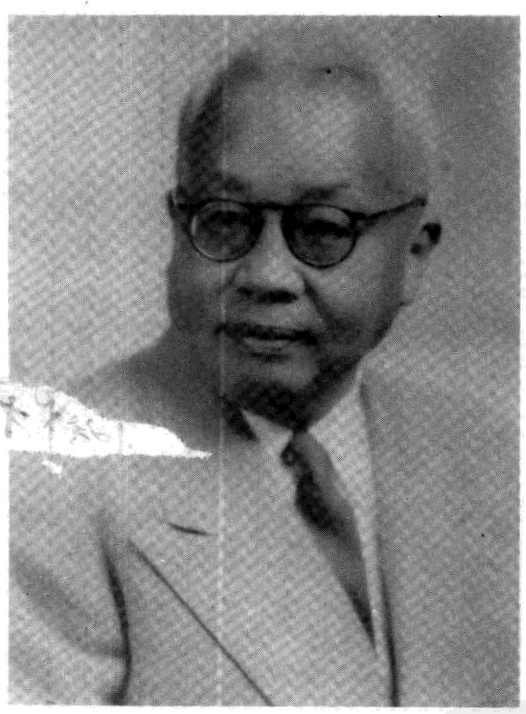
- Tang Yongtong.
- Born: August 4, 1893; Weiyuan County, Gansu, Qing China
- Died: May 1, 1964 (aged 70); Beijing, China
- Resting place: Babaoshan
- Education: Tsinghua School; Shuntian School; Harvard University
- Occupations: Educator, scholar, philosopher
- Organization: Academia Sinica
- Spouse: Zhang Jingping
- Children: Four, including Tang Yijie
- Parent: Tang Lin (father)

Chinese name
- Traditional Chinese: 湯用彤
- Simplified Chinese: 汤用彤
Transcriptions
Standard Mandarin
- Hanyu Pinyin: Tāng Yòngtóng

Xiyu
- Traditional Chinese: 錫予
- Simplified Chinese: 锡予
Transcriptions
Standard Mandarin
- Hanyu Pinyin: Xīyǔ

Tang Yongtong (Chinese: 湯用彤; pinyin: Tāng Yòngtóng; 4 August 1893 – 1 May 1964) was a Chinese educator, philosopher and scholar best known for studying Chinese Buddhism. Tang was proficient in Sanskrit, Pali, English and Japanese.

Tang attended the Tsinghua School and Shuntian School before he pursued advanced studies in the United States. While studying at Harvard University, he became known as "one of the three Outstanding Persons of Harvard" along with Chen Yinke and Wu Mi.

He was an academician of the Academia Sinica. He was a member of the 1st National Committee of the Chinese People's Political Consultative Conference. He was also a delegate to the 1st, 2nd and 3rd National People's Congress.

== Biography ==
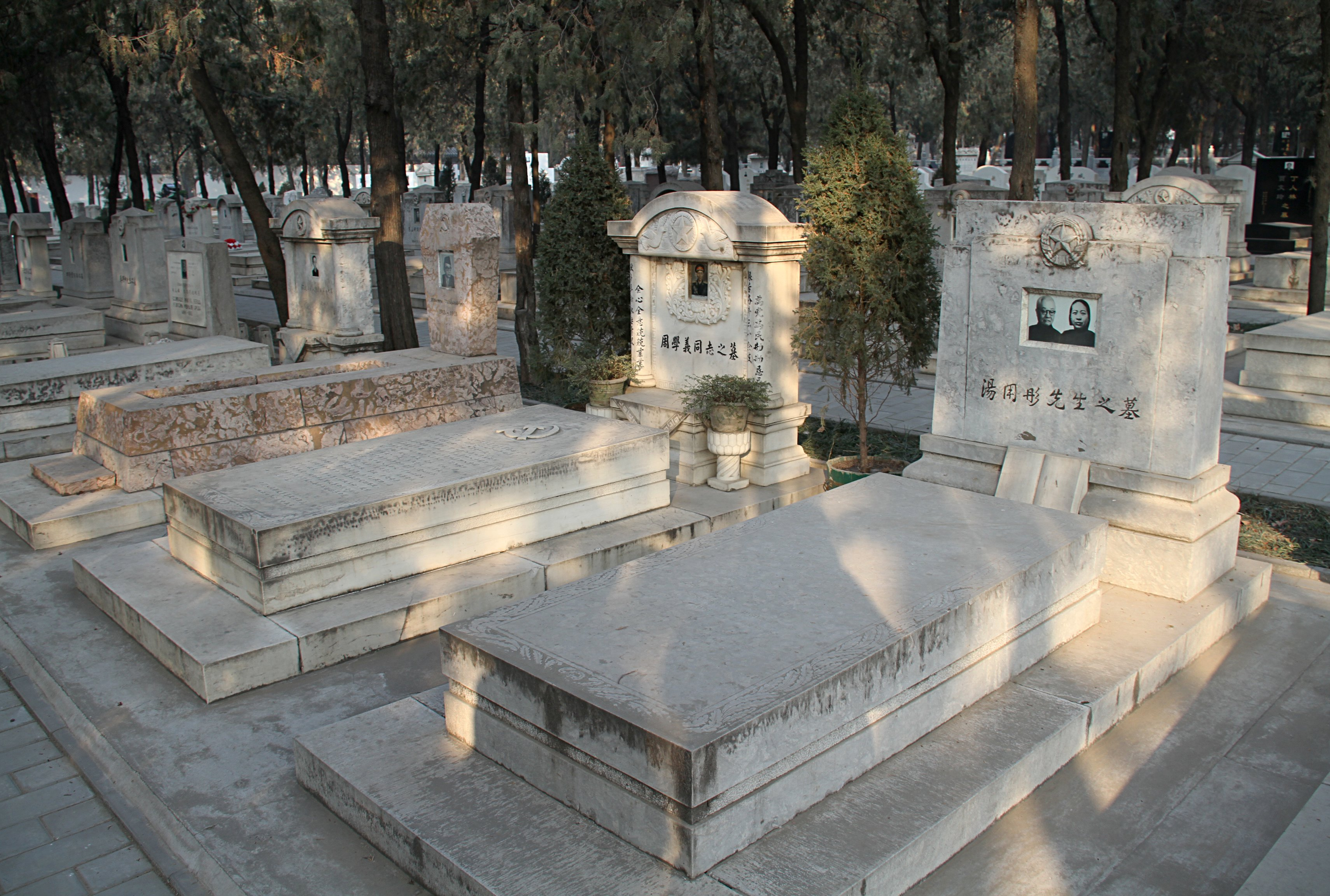
Tomb of Tang Yongtong in Babaoshan, Beijing.

Tang was born in Weiyuan County, Gansu on August 4, 1893, while his ancestral home in Huangmei County, Hubei. His father Tang Lin (湯霖) was a scholar in the late Qing dynasty. In 1908 he attended the Shuntian School. In 1911, he enrolled at the Tsinghua School, where he graduated in 1916. Tang arrived in the United States in 1918 at the age of 25 to begin his education at Harvard University in Cambridge, Massachusetts.

He returned to China after graduation in 1922 and that same year became professor of National Southeast University. After a short period of teaching students in Nankai University, he returned to Nanjing, where he was a professor at National Central University. In 1931, he moved to Peking University as a professor at the Department of Philosophy, where he was promoted to dean of College of Liberal Arts in 1946. In the following 1947 he went to the University of California, Berkeley, where he lectured the History of Chinese Buddhism. In 1948 he was elected a fellow of the Academia Sinica. In December 1948 he refused to go to Taipei, Taiwan, while Chiang Kai-shek invited him to follow the Nationalists. In January 1949 he was proposed as the new chairman of Peking University.

In 1949, the year of the defeat of the Communists over the Nationalists in the Chinese Civil War, Tang stayed on Peking University in Beijing. He was appointed vice-president of Peking University in 1951. Two years later, he was elected a member of the newly established Chinese Academy of Sciences. In 1954, he was diagnosed with intracerebral hemorrhage and then stayed in bed for a long time. Tang died in Beijing on May 1, 1964.

== Personal life ==
Tang married Zhang Jingping (張敬平). The couple had two sons and two daughters, in order of birth: Tang Yimei (湯一梅; died young), Tang Yijie (湯一介), Tang Yixuan (湯一玄) and Tang Yiping (湯一平). Their elder son, Tang Yijie (1927–2014), was a Peking University professor, who had been described as China's top scholar on philosophy and Chinese studies.

Educational offices
Preceded by Hu Shih	President of Peking University; 1949–1951	Succeeded by Ma Yinchu
