= Bo're Temple =

Bo're Temple (Chinese: 般若寺; pinyin: Bōrě Sì) may refer to:

- Bo're Temple (Changchun), in Changchun, Jilin, China
- Bo're Temple (Shenyang), in Shenyang, Liaoning, China
- Bo're Temple (Dujiangyan), in Puyang Town of Dujiangyan, Sichuan, China
- Bo're Temple (Neijiang), in Dongxing District of Neijiang, Sichuan, China
- Bo're Temple (Xianyang), in Chengguan Town of Qian County, Xianyang, Shaanxi, China
- Bo're Temple (Fenyang), in Yangcheng Township of Fenyang, Shanxi, China
- Bo're Temple (Shaoxing), in Shangyu District of Shaoxing, Zhejiang, China
- Bo're Temple (Shiyan), in Shiyan, Hubei, China
