= Bo're Temple (Changchun) =

Buddhist temple in Changchun, Jilin, China

- 般若寺
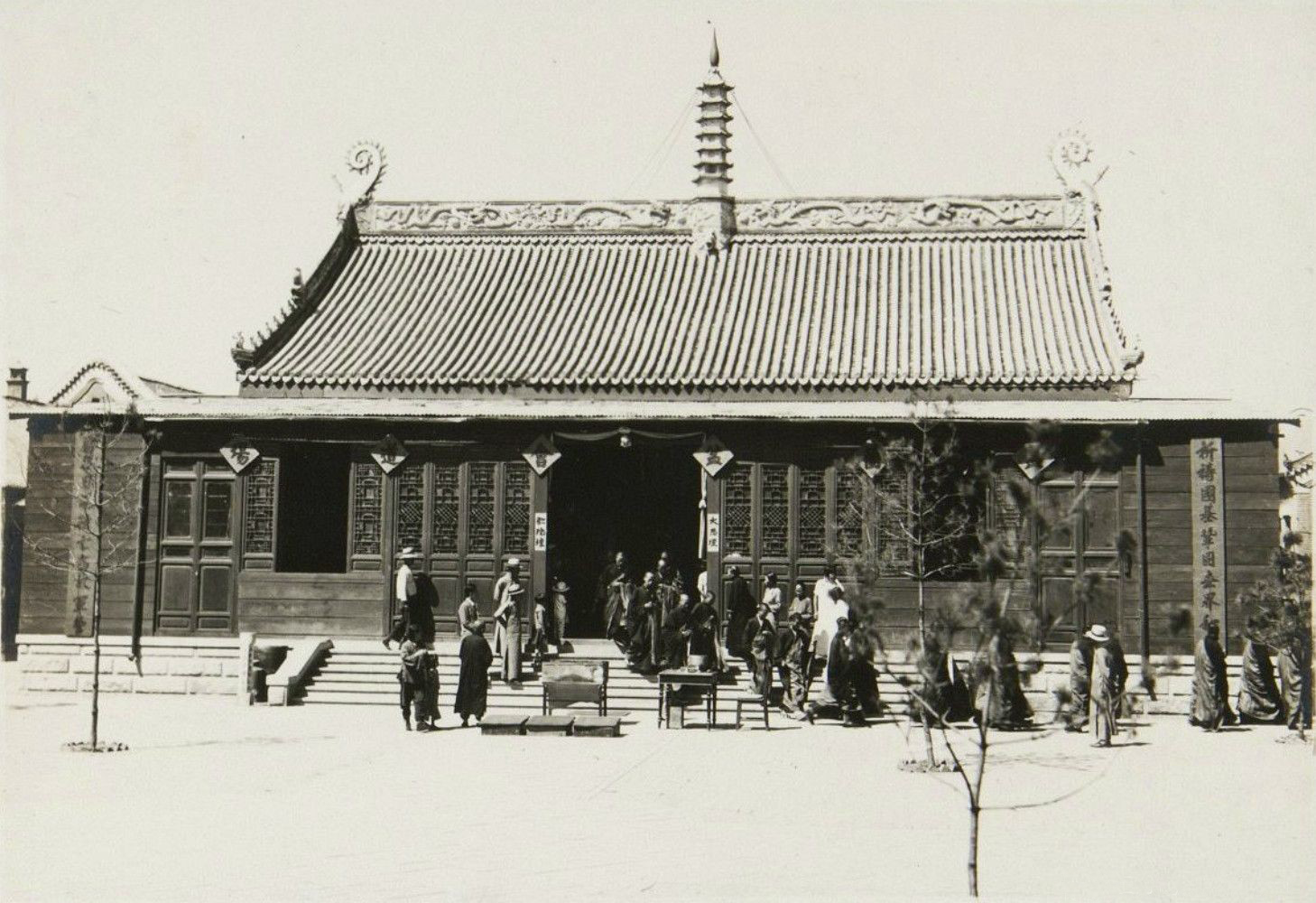
- Bo're Temple

- Location within Jilin Location within China

Religion
- Affiliation: Buddhism
- Sect: Tiantai

Location
- Location: Nanguan District, Changchun, Jilin
- Country: China
- Interactive map of Bo're Temple
- Coordinates: 43°53′42″N 125°20′05″E

Architecture
- Style: Chinese architecture
- Founder: Tanxu
- Established: 1923
- Completed: 1936 (reconstruction)

Website
- www.ccbrs.com

The Bo're Temple (Chinese: 般若寺; pinyin: Bōrě Sì; lit. 'Prajna Temple') is a Buddhist temple located in Nanguan District of Changchun, Jilin, China.

== History ==
In 1923, master Tanxu went to Changchun, capital of Jilin province, to teach the Heart Sutra, and founded the Bo're Temple subsequently. On September 18, 1931, the September 18th incident broke out, then the Japanese army occupied Changchun. In order to build a railway, they demolished Bo're Temple. The temple was moved to Changchun Street and renamed "Huguo Bo're Temple" (护国般若寺) in 1934. In 1936, the Shanmen, Tianwang Hall and Daxiongbao Hall were successively completed. Master Tanxu held a consecration ceremony.

In 1983, Bo're Temple has been designated as a National Key Buddhist Temple in Han Chinese Area by the State Council of China.

== Architecture ==
The temple occupies an area of 14,000 square metres (150,000 sq ft) and is the largest Buddhist temples in Changchun. The entire complex divided into three courtyards. Along the central axis of the temple stand seven buildings including the Shanmen, Tianwang Hall, Mi Le Hall, Daxiongbao Hall, Xifang Sansheng Hall, and Zangjing Ge. Subsidiary structures were built on both sides of the central axis including the Drum Tower, Bell Tower, and wing-rooms.

=== Shanmen ===
In the center of the eaves of the Shanmen is a plaque, on which there are the words "Huguo Bo're Temple" (护国般若寺). On both sides of the shanmen there are two Chinese guardian lions.

=== Tianwang Hall ===
The bodhisattva Mi Le is enshrined in the Tianwang Hall, or Hall of the Four Heavenly King, and at the back of his statue is a statue of Weituo. Statues of the Four Heavenly Kings are enshrined in the left and right side of the hall.

=== Daxiongbao Hall ===
The Daxiongbao Hall is the main hall in the temple. In the middle of the hall placed the statue of Shijiamouni, with statue of Guanyin at his back. The statues of Eighteen Arhats stand on both sides of the hall.

=== Xifang Sansheng Hall ===
The Xifang Sansheng Hall, or Hall of the Three Sages of the West (西方三圣殿), enshrines the triad of Sukhavati Known as the Three Saints of the West), namely Amituofo, Guanyin and Dashizhi.

== List of abbots ==
English title	Chinese title	Entered office	Left office
Tanxu	倓虚	1923	1932
Shupei	澍培	1932	1983
Chenggang	成刚	1983	2017
