= Tang Yijie =

Chinese philosopher (1927–2014)

Tang Yijie 汤一介
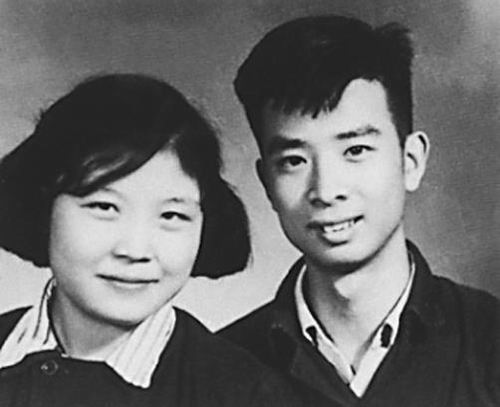
- Tang Yijie with wife Yue Daiyun in 1953
- Born: 16 February 1927; Tianjin, China
- Died: 9 September 2014 (aged 87); Beijing
- Education: Peking University
- Spouse: Yue Daiyun (乐黛云)
- Scientific career
- Fields: Philosophy; Sinology
- Workplaces: Peking University

Tang Yijie (Chinese: 汤一介; pinyin: Tāng Yījiè; Wade–Giles: T'ang I-chieh; 16 February 1927 − 9 September 2014) was a Chinese scholar and professor at Peking University, who has been described as China's top scholar on philosophy and Chinese studies. He spearheaded the Confucian Canon project, seeking to compile important classical works on Confucianism, and was the first director of the Institute of Confucian Studies at Peking University.

== Life and career ==
Tang was born in Tianjin in 1927. His father, Tang Yongtong, was a scholar of Chinese traditional philosophy and President of Peking University (PKU). Tang Yijie entered PKU in 1946 and graduated in 1951. While at PKU, he was in the same class with Shen Chong, although he did not know her personally. He participated in the nationwide anti-American protests in 1946 after Shen was allegedly raped by American soldiers.

In 1958, Tang was affected by the Anti-Rightist Movement, when he objected to his wife being declared a "Rightist" and expelled from the Chinese Communist Party (CCP). After the start of the Cultural Revolution in 1966, he lost his teaching position at Peking University and was sent to the countryside to perform manual labour. In 1973, he became part of the "Liang Xiao" (梁效) criticism group, and was investigated after the end of the Cultural Revolution. He was not able to resume teaching until 1980, when he was 51.

Tang wrote more than two dozen books on schools of Chinese philosophy. In the last decade of his life, he led the monumental "Confucian Canon" (儒藏) project, which involves 400 scholars. The project seeks to compile important classical works on Confucianism, estimated to comprise more than 5,000 works with approximately a billion Chinese characters. The project is due to be finished in 2025. In 2010, the Institute of Confucian Studies was established at Peking University, and Tang Yijie was named its first director. In May 2014, CCP general secretary Xi Jinping visited Tang at Peking University, and lauded him for his "exceptional contribution" to the promotion of traditional Chinese culture.

== Political views ==
Tang Yijie supported political reforms in China. During the 1989 Tiananmen Square protests and massacre, he joined a group of eminent scholars to plead to the government for leniency for the dissident Wei Jingsheng, who had been imprisoned for a decade for advocating democracy.

== Family ==
Tang Yijie met Yue Daiyun, a fellow student at Peking University, in 1949, and married her in 1952. They remained married until his death. Yue is a scholar of comparative literature. The couple have a son and a daughter.

== Death ==
Tang Yijie fell ill in 2013 and died on 9 September 2014 in Beijing, at the age of 87.
