= Cham Shan Monastery =

Buddhist monastery in Hong Kong

Coordinates: 22.297186°N 114.294019°E

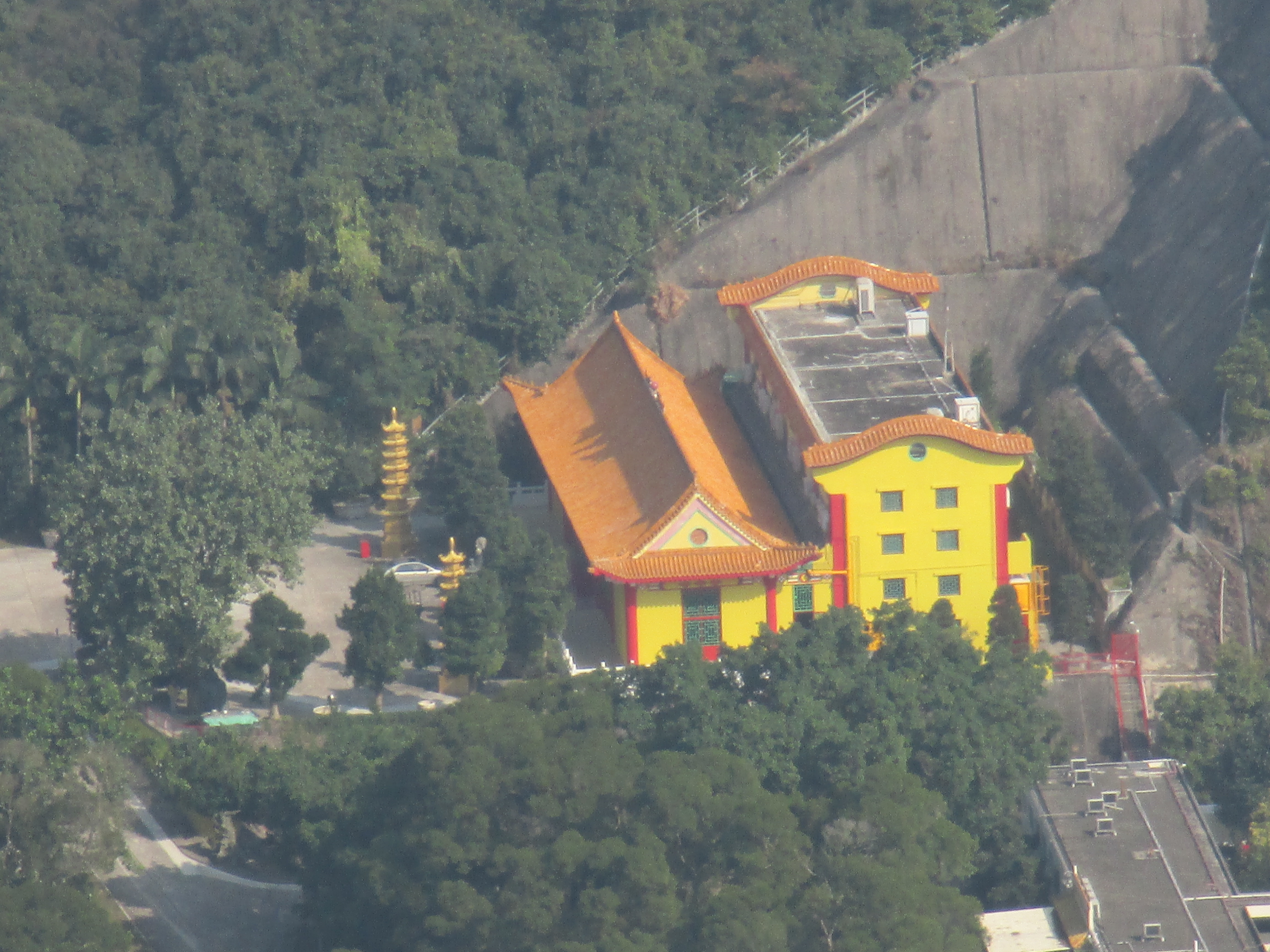
Cham Shan Monastery viewed from High Junk Peak

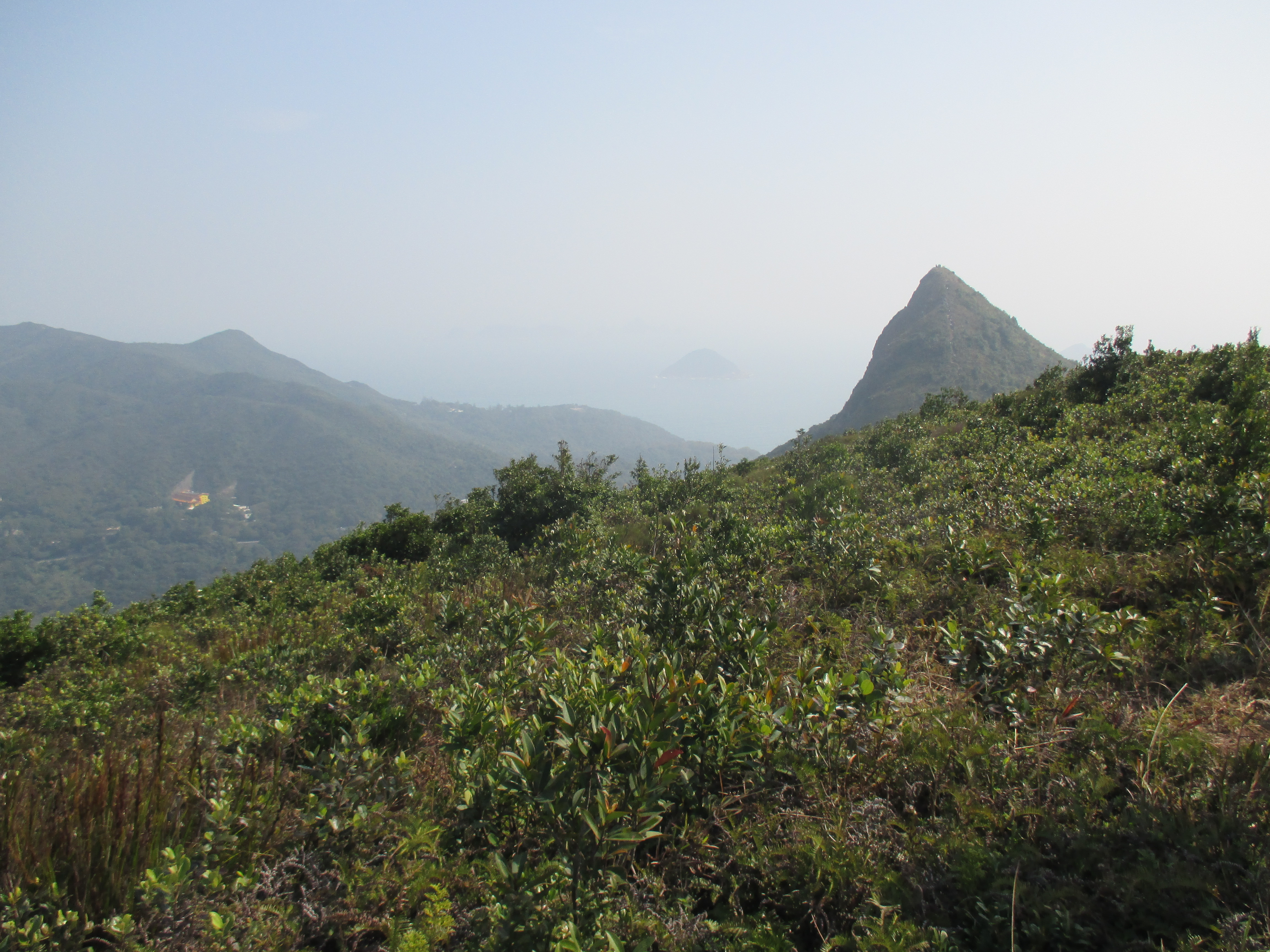
View of High Junk Peak. Cham Shan Monastery can be seen in the distance on the left.

Cham Shan Monastery (Chinese: 湛山寺; Jyutping: zaam3 saan1 zi6) is a Buddhist monastery in Hong Kong. It is located at 73 Lung Ha Wan Road, Clear Water Bay Peninsula.

The monastery is named after Zhanshan Temple in Qingdao and is designed based on it.

== History ==
Cham Shan Monastery was built in 1964.

== Features ==
The Great Buddha's Hall is one of the largest in Hong Kong. The monastery is a popular filming location for costume dramas.
