= Ruzang =

Ongoing project aiming to compile all known classical works on Confucianism

The Ruzang or Confucian Canon (Chinese: 儒藏) is an ongoing project to compile important and representative classical works on Confucianism, Thirteen Classics and others comparable to the Daozang (Taoist Canon) and the Chinese Buddhist Canon. It also includes Japanese, Korean and Vietnamese Confucian classics.

The project, which involves 400 scholars, was led by the prominent Peking University philosopher Tang Yijie until his death in 2014. Due to be finished in 2025, the Canon is estimated to comprise more than 5,000 works with approximately a billion Chinese characters.

== Compilation ==
Confucian Canon project is set to be carried out in two steps, the first step (called the "Essence") is a compilation of the most influential Confucian texts in Chinese, Japanese, Korean, and Vietnamese literature totalling around 339 volumes. The second step is the size of the project will be expanded to more than 3,000 volumes including the "Essence".

On 22 April 2023, Peking University declared that the Chinese portion of the "Essence" had been fully complied which consists of 510 Chinese Confucian writings in 282 volumes. In the next stage of the project, another 160 Confucian writings from Japan, Korea, and Vietnam will be complied.

== See also ==
- Chinese classics
