= Zhanshan Temple =

Buddhist temple in Qingdao, China

- Dschanschan-Tempel 湛山寺
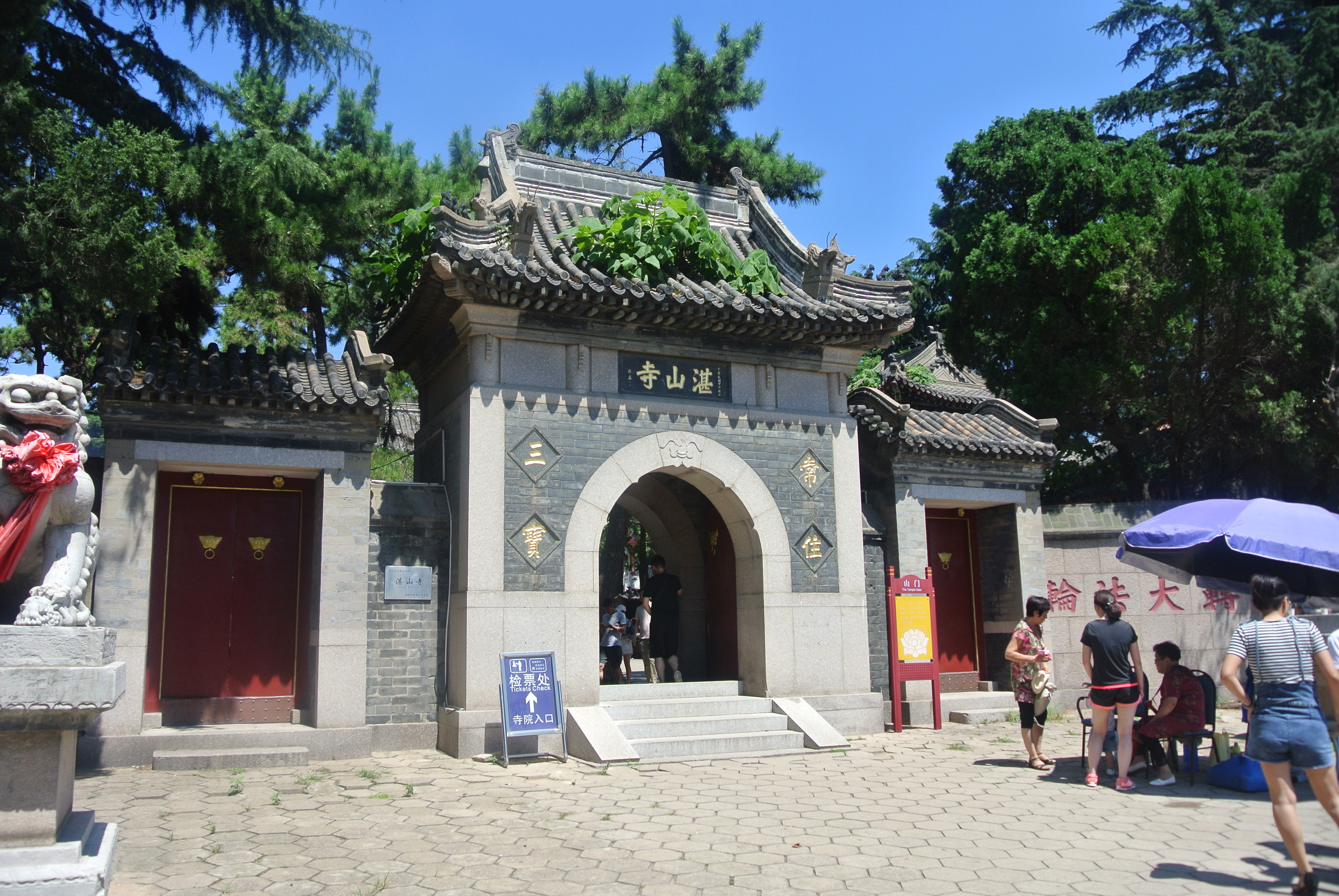
- Shanmen

- Location within Shandong

Religion
- Affiliation: Buddhism
- Sect: Tiantai

Location
- Location: Shinan District, Qingdao, Shandong, China
- Coordinates: 36°03′53″N 120°21′32″E

Architecture
- Style: Chinese architecture
- Founder: Tanxu
- Groundbreaking: 1933
- Completed: 1945

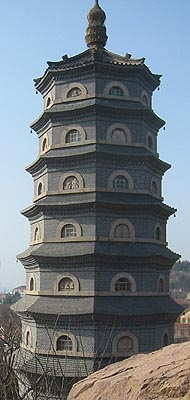
Zhanshan Temple pagoda (taken April, 2004)

Zhanshan Temple (German: Dschanschan-Tempel; Chinese: 湛山寺; pinyin: Zhànshān Sì) is a Buddhist temple in Shinan District of Qingdao, Shandong, China. It is located on the southern side of Zhanshan (literally 'clear' or 'deep mountain'), facing the sea.

In 2004 a major renovation was initiated. As of June 2009, the renovation remains in progress.

Cham Shan Monastery in Hong Kong is named after it and is designed based on it.

== Features ==
The monastery was completed in 1945 and is an active, functional Buddhist sanctuary. Apart from the Stupa and the Olympic Mascot Bell Tower, located on the right-hand side of the grounds, the remaining buildings are situated in a rectangular format. To the right of the entry portal is one of the several Buddhist scripture shops. Here, incense sticks and other Buddhist supplies are available for purchase. Adjacent the scripture shop is a Bell tower with the first of many statues of Buddha. At the right of the entry is the Drum tower with another Buddha.

Returning to the central path, directly ahead is the Four Heavenly Kings Hall. The large Buddha, which is the focal point of this shrine, is flanked by four large statues, one depicting a pipa player. Directly behind Heavenly King Hall is the larger Mahavira Hall, which honors the founder of Buddhism, the son of a king of the Sakya clan of the Kshatriya (i.e., warriors). His given name was Siddhartha, his family name, Gautama. The epithet “Sakyamuni” means “sage of the Sakyas.” In this magnificent hall, a large, central Buddha is flanked by two smaller statues, each attended by eight priests. This hall is an active place of prayer equipped with cushions for kneeling, candles for lighting incense, and other Buddhist prayer supplies.

Behind the Hall of Sakyamuni is the Hall of Three Saints (三圣殿). In the center of the hall are three large, gilded statues, each about twelve feet in height.

Continuing along the central path, the next building is the Preaching Hall (圣堂). To the left of Preaching Hall is the Hall of the Recumbent Buddha (卧佛殿), where, behind a long, gilded altar, a gilded, bejeweled statue of Buddha stretches out almost twenty feet in length.

Opposite the Hall of the Recumbent Buddha is the Shandong Zhanshan Buddhist College (山东湛山佛学院). To the right of the Hall of the Recumbent Buddha is the headquarters of the Qingdao Buddhist Association (青岛市佛教协会). Exiting the monastery grounds, one passes the Olympic Mascot Bell (奥运吉祥钟). The view from the top of this bell tower is panoramic; however, there is an additional fee of 10 CNY to see that view.

== Annual events ==
The 8 April of the lunar calendar is traditionally observed as the birthday of the Buddha. On that day, thousands of Buddhists flock to the monastery grounds to attend religious events.

== See also ==
- Religion in China
