= Tanxu =

- 倓虚
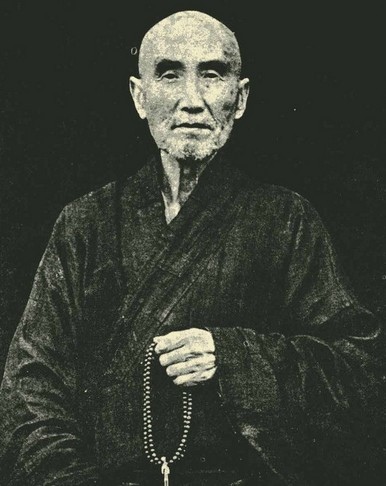
- Title: Venerable Master

Personal life
- Born: Wang Futing (王福庭); July 3, 1875 Hebei, Qing Empire
- Died: August 11, 1963 (aged 88) British Hong Kong
- Children: Wang Weiji (王维纪)
- Notable work(s): Recollections of Shadows and Dust
- Occupation: Buddhist Monk

Religious life
- Religion: Buddhism
- School: Tiantai
- Lineage: Tiantai school (44th generation)
- Dharma name: Long Xian (隆衔)

Senior posting
- Teacher: Dixian (谛闲)
- Post: First President of the Hong Kong Buddhist Association

Tanxu (simplified Chinese: 倓虚; traditional Chinese: 倓虛; pinyin: Tánxū; July 3, 1875 – August 11, 1963) was a Chinese Buddhist monk and a 44th generation lineage holder of the Tiantai school, taught by Master Dixian. Tanxu is known as one of the most influential monks to have had lived during the late Qing and Republican periods of Chinese history, spreading and invigorating the practice of Buddhism throughout the region. He was also famous for constructing several Buddhist temples and institutes in Northern China in the early 20th century.

== Early life and career ==
Tanxu was born as Wang Futing on July 3, 1875, in Ninghe County, Hebei province, approximately thirty miles north of Tianjin. Out of his eight siblings, Wang was the only child to live to adulthood, and as his father was often away on business, his mother, Née Zhang, took care of the four generations of family members that lived in Wang's home during his childhood.

In 1885, at the age of 10, Wang began attending school. He wished to receive a Confucian education; however, after four years, he decided to drop out of his schooling. Wang began to apprentice in a local store owned by his paternal uncle, where he learned basic accounting skills. He left the apprenticeship after a duration of six months.

In the summer of 1891, when he was seventeen, Wang's mother arranged a marriage for him. Several days after the wedding ceremony, Wang became extremely sick, took to his bed and became unconscious for several days. It was during this state of unconsciousness that Wang had visions of visiting the netherworld.

In 1893, Wang was unhappy living in Beitang with his new wife, and so, leaving his spouse behind, moved to Fengtian to join his cousins' business of transporting tobacco. However, as Wang remained in Beitang through the fall of 1894, he witnessed the beginning of the First Sino-Japanese War. When Japan crossed the Yalu River in China, on October 25, 1894, part of the invading army marched in the direction of Fengtian. Though the troops did not reach the city, the news caused panic in the city, and Wang fled the region. After walking with a group of refugees to Shanhaiguan, he took a train back to Beitang.

Wang returned to Beitang, a few weeks before the Chinese New Year in 1894, to the news that his father had died. After the passing of his mother in 1898, Wang, leading a few fellow villagers, headed to Dalian to earn a living. His pharmacy flourished there, so much so that he could afford to return home to visit his wife and children. By 1908, he had moved his family to Yingkou, and it was during this period that Wang began to investigate Buddhist scriptures, especially the Śūraṅgama Sūtra.

== Monastic life ==
By the summer of 1914, Wang Futing had studied the Śūraṅgama Sūtra intensely for eight years, and he felt that there was little more he could learn without leading a monastic life. He left home and visited a temple in Beijing, where he spent a week attending lectures by Master Baoyi. During this time, he was befriended by Master Qingchi. In 1917, at the age of 43, Wang was introduced by Master Qingchi to Master Yinchun. That year he was tonsured nominally in the Gaoming temple, under late Master Yinku, and he was also ordained as a monk under Master Dixian in the Guanzong Temple in Ningbo. From then on, Wang Futing was known as Master Tanxu. He enrolled at the Guanzong Temple seminary, which had been founded to train a new generation of monks.

== Buddhism propagation in the North ==
In 1920, Tanxu left Guangzong Temple to travel northward, and his career founding temples and schools, as well as lecturing, began. By 1948, he had constructed and restored more than ten Buddhist temples among which were Surangama Temple (楞严寺) in Yingkou; Ultimate Bliss Temple in Harbin; Prajna Temple (般若寺) in Changchun; Tranquil Mountain Temple in Qingdao; Amitabha Temple (弥陀寺) in Jiling; Great Compassion Temple in Tianjin; and Prajna Temple (般若寺) and Eternal Peace Temple (永安寺) in Shenyang.

Tanxu had a particular important role in spreading Buddhism to Harbin. The city, which is currently part of China, was a place of contention throughout the late 19th and early 20th centuries, being under Russian, Japanese, and Chinese control for periods during that time. However, as Chinese control of the city grew in the 1920s, Tanxu visited the region. Upon learning that there were Christian churches in the city, but no Buddhist temple at all, he remarked, "there was absolutely no Chinese Buddhism... For Harbin, as a Chinese place, not to have a single proper Chinese temple... it was simply too depressing to bear!"

== Life in Hong Kong and death ==
In 1949, with assistance from Ye Gongchuo, Tanxu moved to Hong Kong. During his time there, he first presided over the South China Buddhist Institute (華南佛學院), and then, in 1958, initiated the building of a Buddhist library in the city. James Carter, Professor of History at St. Joseph's University, writes the following about Tanxu's lectures in Hong Kong:

Each Sunday, Tanxu lectured at the library, attracting large crowds to the small room on Boundary Street. His lectures focused on the sutras that had been most important to his own life and career, beginning with the Surangama Sutra—the first text he had studied in Yingkou, some fifty years before—and then the Lotus Sutra, the central text of Tiantai.

In the spring of 1963, Tanxu finished lecturing on the Śūraṅgama Sūtra and began the Diamond Sūtra. In the fifth lunar month of that year, he began to feel fatigued and was unable to continue lecturing or directing any further temple construction. On the 22nd day of the sixth lunar month, on August 11, 1963, three weeks after his 88th birthday, Tanxu died.
