= Guanzong Temple =

Buddhist Temple

- 观宗寺
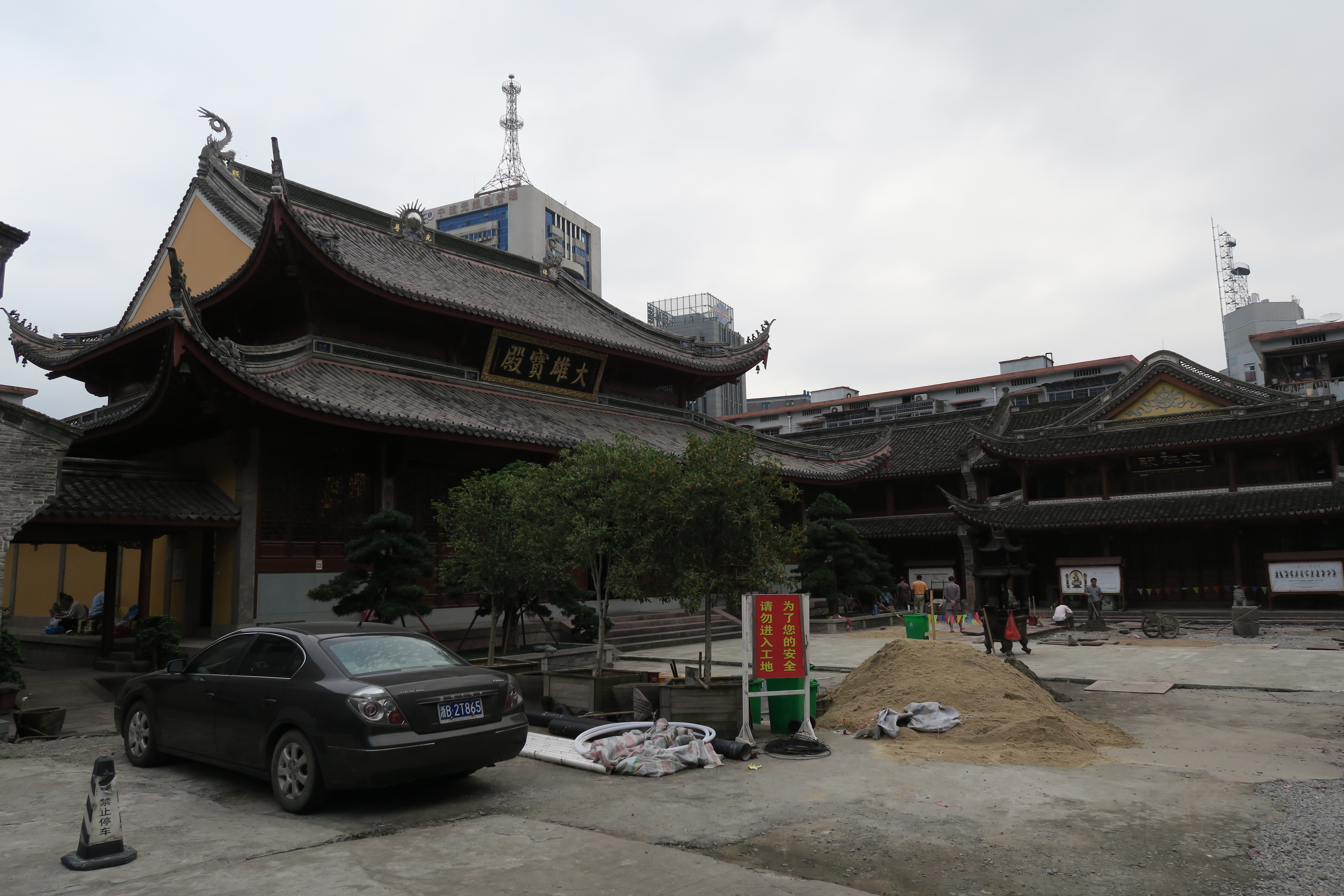
- The Mahavira Hall at Guanzong Temple.

- Location within Zhejiang

Religion
- Affiliation: Buddhism
- Deity: Tiantai

Location
- Location: Haishu District, Ningbo, Zhejiang
- Country: China
- Coordinates: 29°52′02″N 121°33′27″E

Architecture
- Style: Chinese architecture
- Established: 1078–1085
- Completed: 20th-century (reconstruction)

Guanzong Temple (simplified Chinese: 观宗寺; traditional Chinese: 觀宗寺; pinyin: Guānzōng Sì) is a Buddhist temple located in Haishu District of Ningbo, Zhejiang, China. Reconstructed in 20th-century.

== History ==
The temple traces its origins to the former Shiliuguan-tang (十六观堂; Shíliùguān Táng), founded by monk Jieran (介然) in the Yuanfeng era (1078–1085) of the Northern Song dynasty (960–1127) and would later become "Guanzong Temple" in early Republic of China. In early Republic of China, Zhang Daqian came to the temple to study Buddhism under master Dixian.

During the ten-year Cultural Revolution, the Red Guard had attacked the temple, wooden statues of the Five Hundred Arhat and statues of "Three-Life Buddha" (三世佛; Sānshì Fó) were demolished by Red Guards. Halls of the temple were used as warehouse, school and conference hall.

On December 5, 1981, it was inscribed as a municipal level cultural heritage by the local government. In 1993, the Ningbo Municipal Government invited Yixing (益行), the acting abbot of Guoqing Temple and forty-seventh generation of Tiantai school, to restore the temple.

== Architecture ==
Now the existing main buildings include Four Heavenly Kings Hall, Mahavira Hall and wing-rooms.

=== Four Heavenly Kings Hall ===
The Four Heavenly Kings Hall is 16-metre (52 ft) high and 22-metre (72 ft) wide with double-eave gable and hip roofs.

=== Mahavira Hall ===
The Mahavira Hall is 21-metre (69 ft) deep and 23-metre (75 ft) wide with double-eave gable and hip roofs. The roof is supported by stone columns.
