= Zhaoshan Temple =

Buddhist temple in Xiangtan, China

- 昭山寺
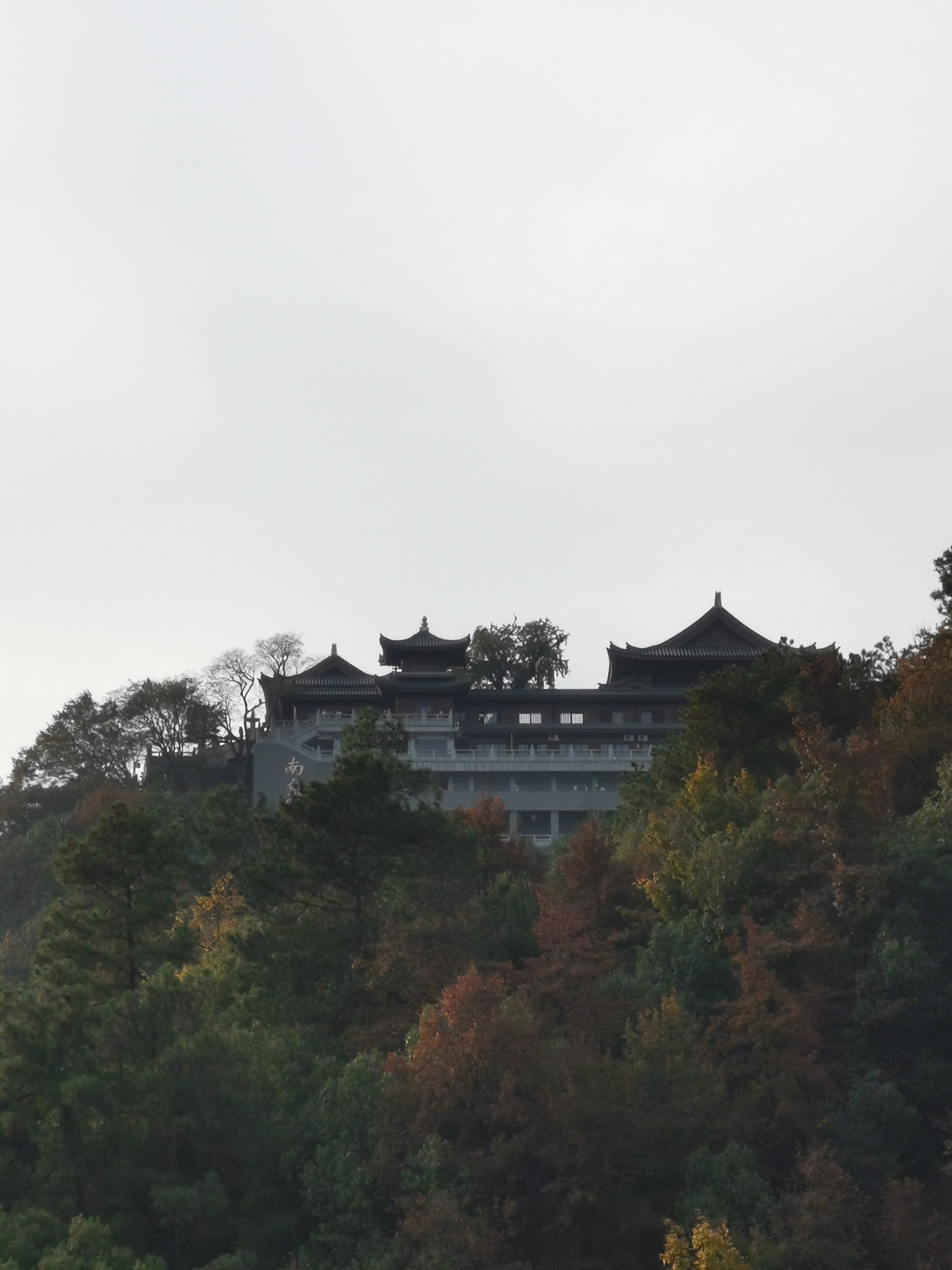
- Zhaoshan Temple

- Location within Hunan Location within China

Religion
- Affiliation: Buddhism
- Sect: Chan Buddhism

Location
- Location: Mount Zhao, Xiangtan, Hunan
- Interactive map of Zhaoshan Temple
- Coordinates: 27°58′03″N 113°00′11″E

Architecture
- Style: Chinese architecture
- Established: Tang dynasty (618–907)
- Completed: 2017 (reconstruction)

Zhaoshan Temple (Chinese: 昭山寺; pinyin: Zhāoshān Sì) is a Buddhist temple located on Mount Zhao, in Xiangtan, Hunan, China.

== History ==
The original temple dates back to the Tang dynasty (618–907).

In September 1982, it has been designated as a municipal level cultural preservation unit by the government of Xiangtan. The current temple was rebuilt in 2017.

== Architecture ==
Zhaoshan Temple is built along the up and down of Mount Zhao and divided into the central, east and west routes. Zhaoshan Temple faces south with the Four Heavenly Kings Hall, Mahavira Hall, and the Guanyin Hall along the central axis of the complex. On both sides of the central axis are Bell Tower, Drum Tower and ring-rooms.

There is a millennium ginkgo tree in the temple. There are dozens of Qing dynasty (1644–1911) steles in the temple.

== Gallery ==
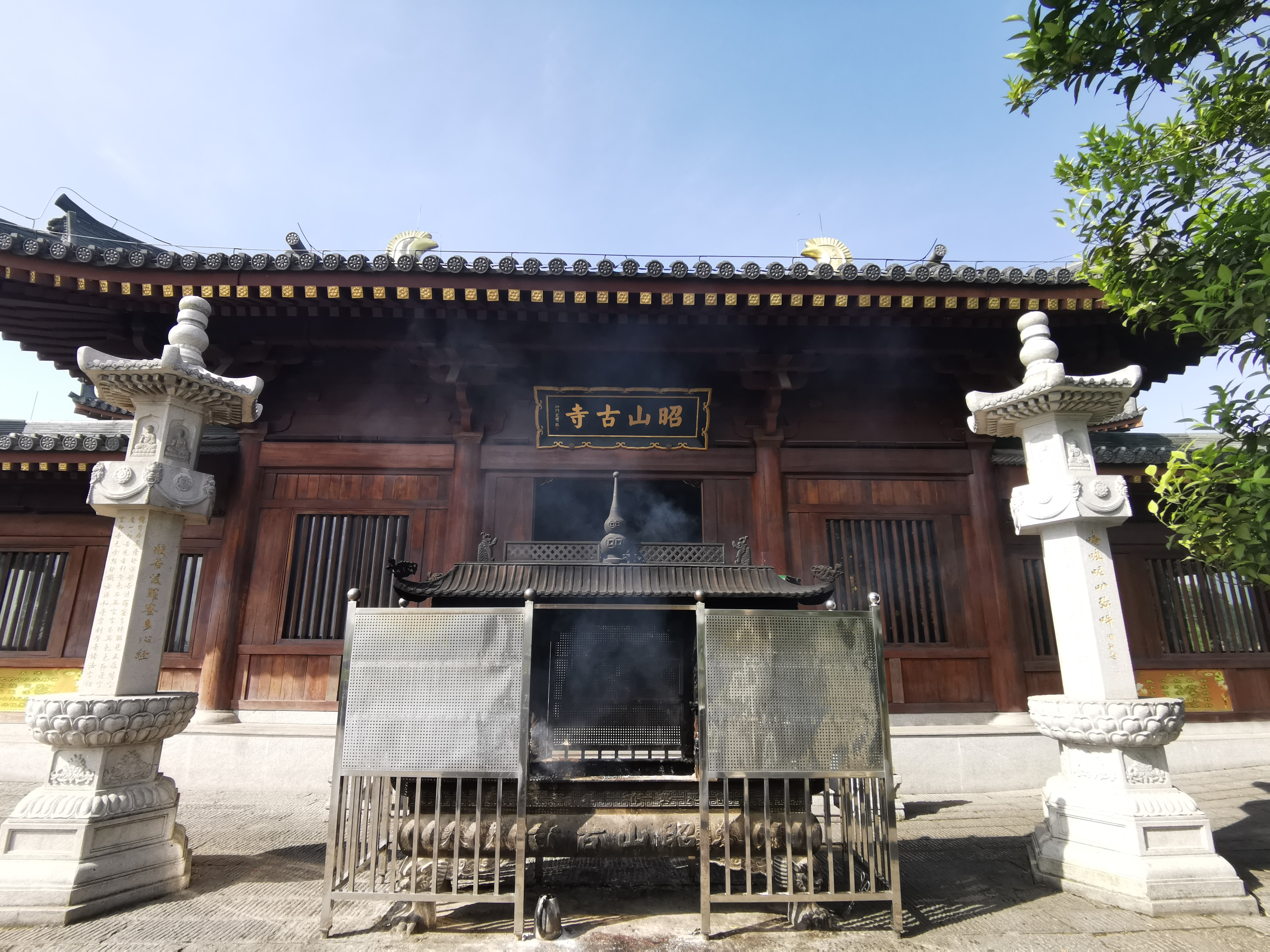
Four Heavenly Kings Hall

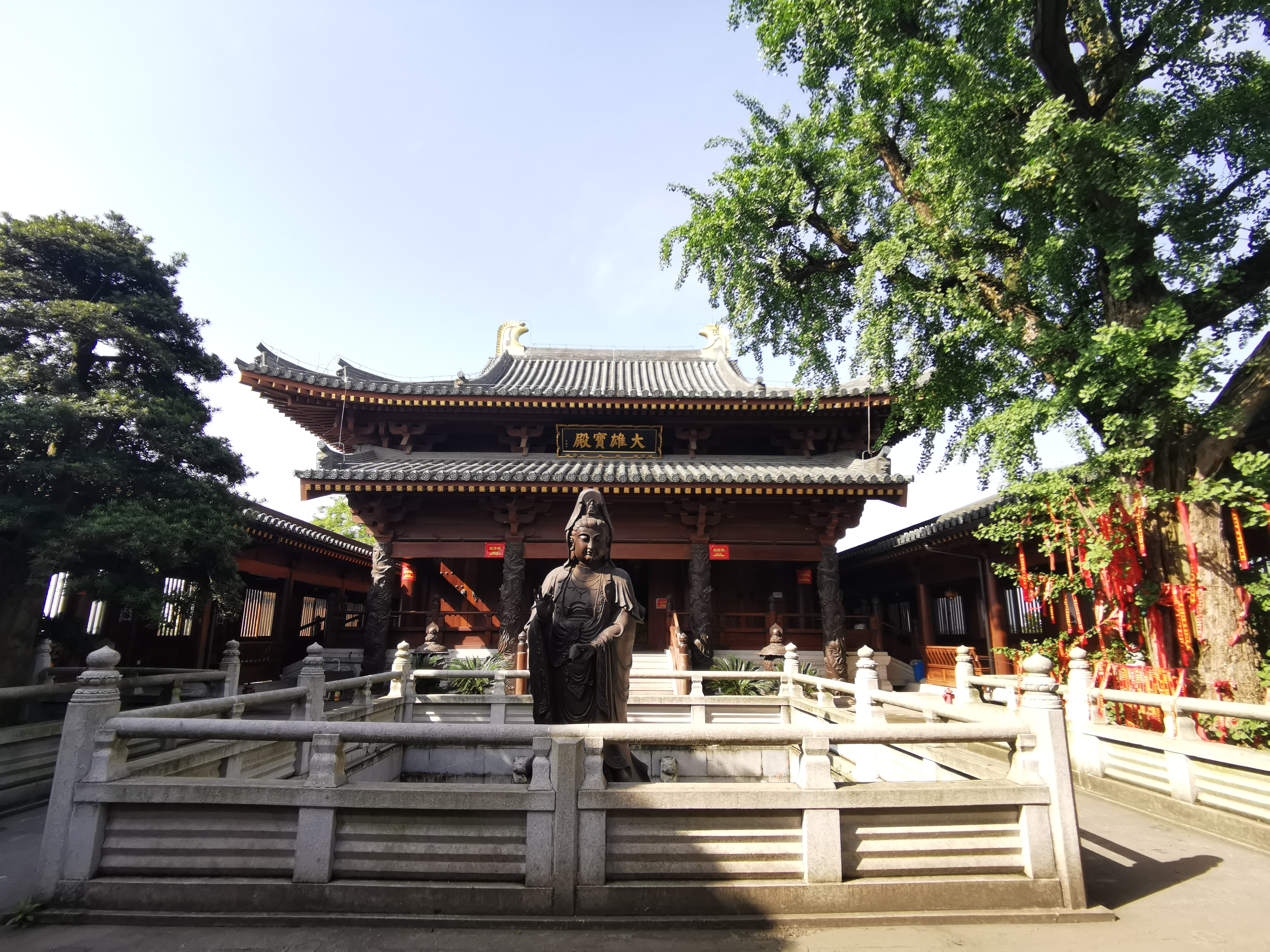
Mahavira Hall

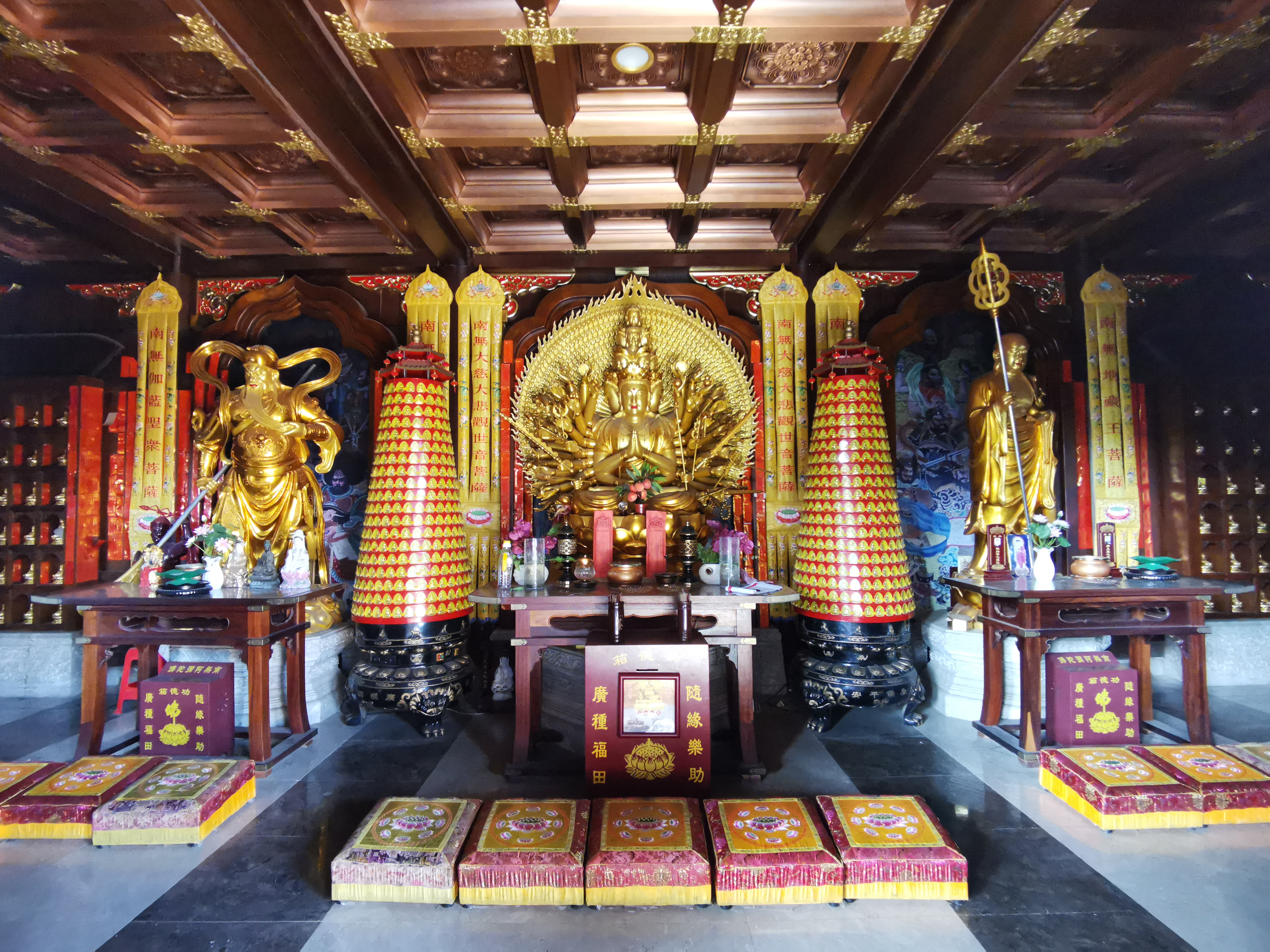
Statues of Thousand Hands and Eyes Guanyin, Guan Yu and Kṣitigarbha at Guanyin Hall
