= Juehai Temple =

Buddhist temple in Jiaxing, China

- 觉海寺
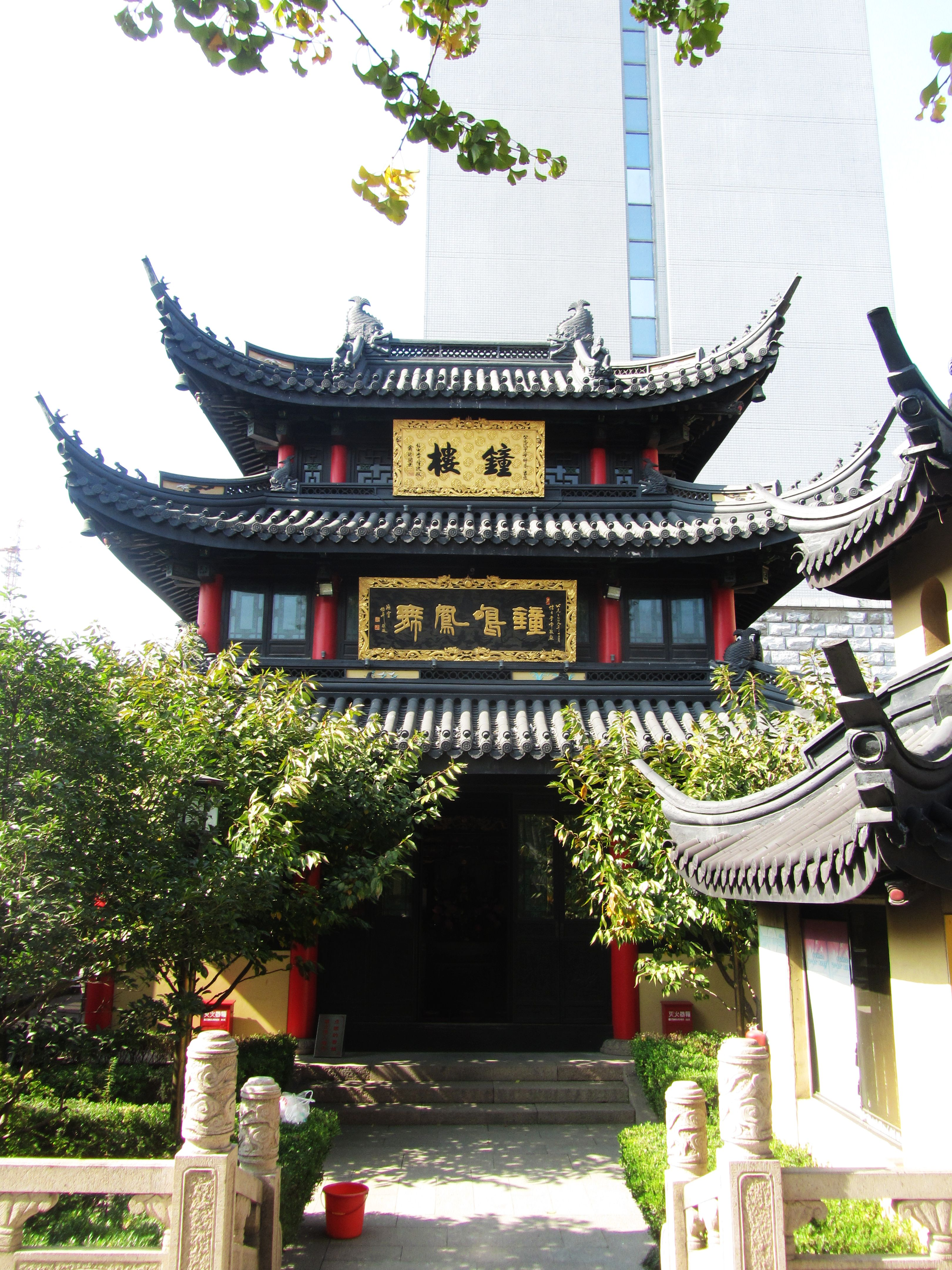
- Bell tower

- Location within Zhejiang

Religion
- Affiliation: Buddhism
- Sect: Linji school

Location
- Location: Nanhu District, Jiaxing, Zhejiang
- Interactive map of Juehai Temple
- Coordinates: 30°45′53″N 120°45′07″E

Architecture
- Style: Chinese architecture
- Founder: Zhao Rupai
- Established: 1249
- Completed: 1862–1875 (reconstruction)

Juehai Temple (simplified Chinese: 觉海寺; traditional Chinese: 覺海寺; pinyin: Juéhǎi Sì) is a Buddhist temple located in Nanhu District of Jiaxing, Zhejiang, China.

== History ==
The temple traces its origins to the former Baozhong Taoist Temple (报忠观), founded by official Zhao Rupai (赵汝俳) in 1249 in the Southern Song dynasty (1127–1279) and would later become a Buddhist temple named Baozhong Temple (报忠寺) in 1364 in the Mongolian ruling Yuan dynasty (1271–1368). It was completely destroyed by wars during the late Yuan and early Ming dynasties. In 1417, in the fifteen year of Yongle period (1403–1424), the temple was rebuilt by monks. In 1733 in the Qing dynasty (1644–1911), Yongzheng Emperor issued the decree building the temple and honored the name, which has been used to date. The Mahavira Hall and wing rooms were demolished during the Taiping Rebellion (1851–1864) and soon reconstructed between 1862 and 1875.

== Architecture ==
The complex include the following halls: Shanmen, Mahavira Hall, Hall of Three Saints, Bell tower, Drum tower, Dining Room, etc.

== Gallery ==
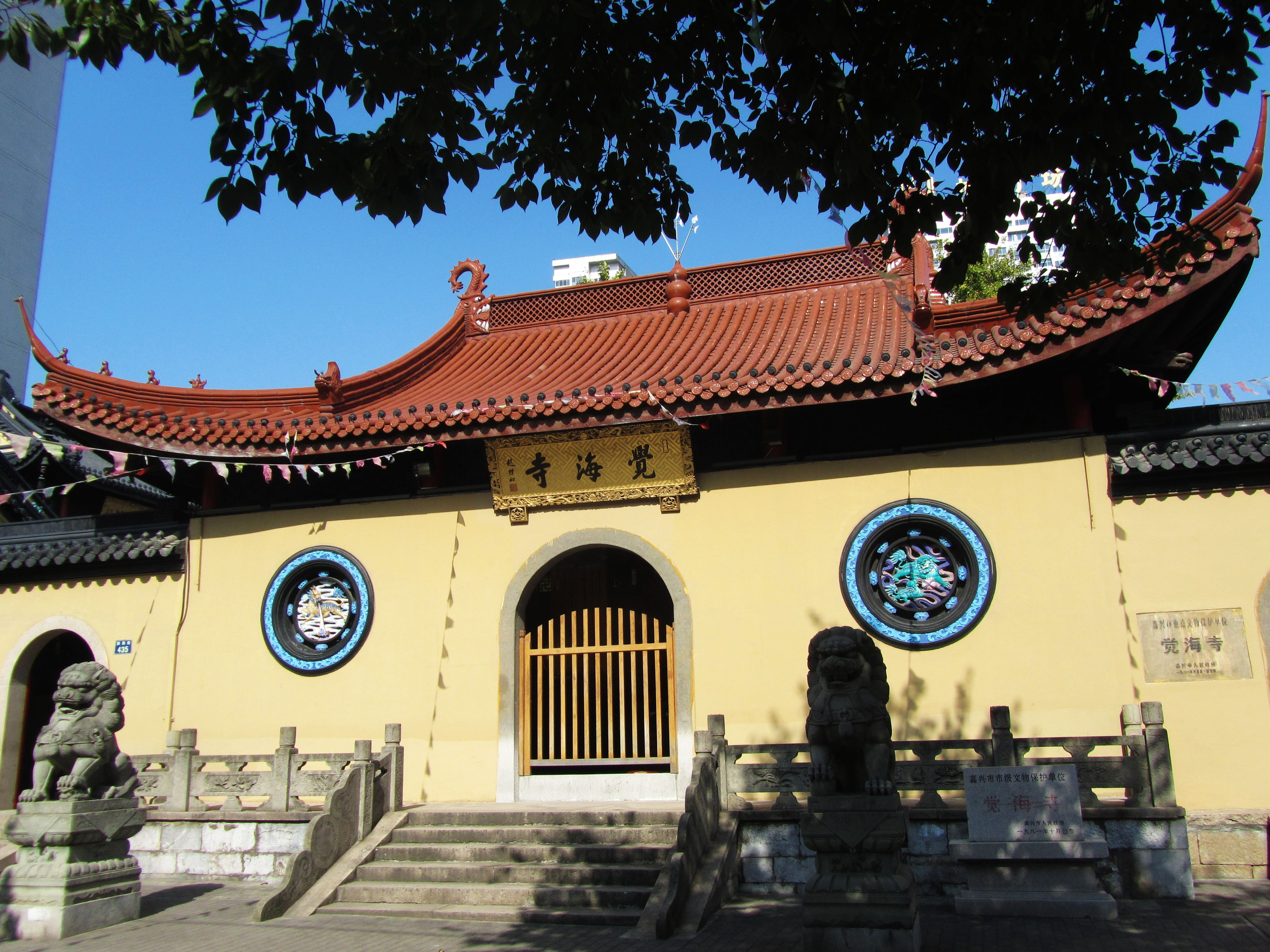
Shanmen

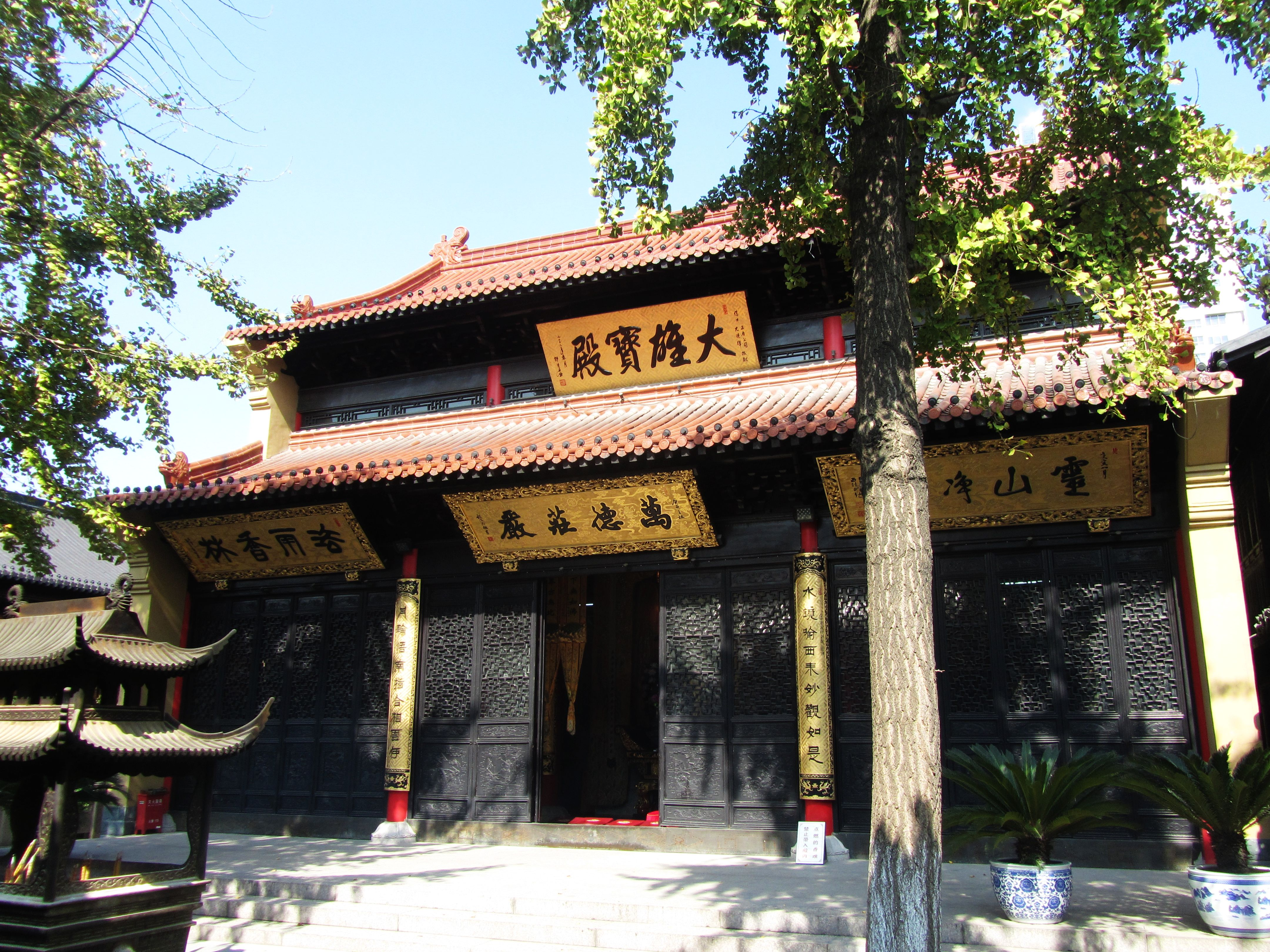
Mahavira Hall

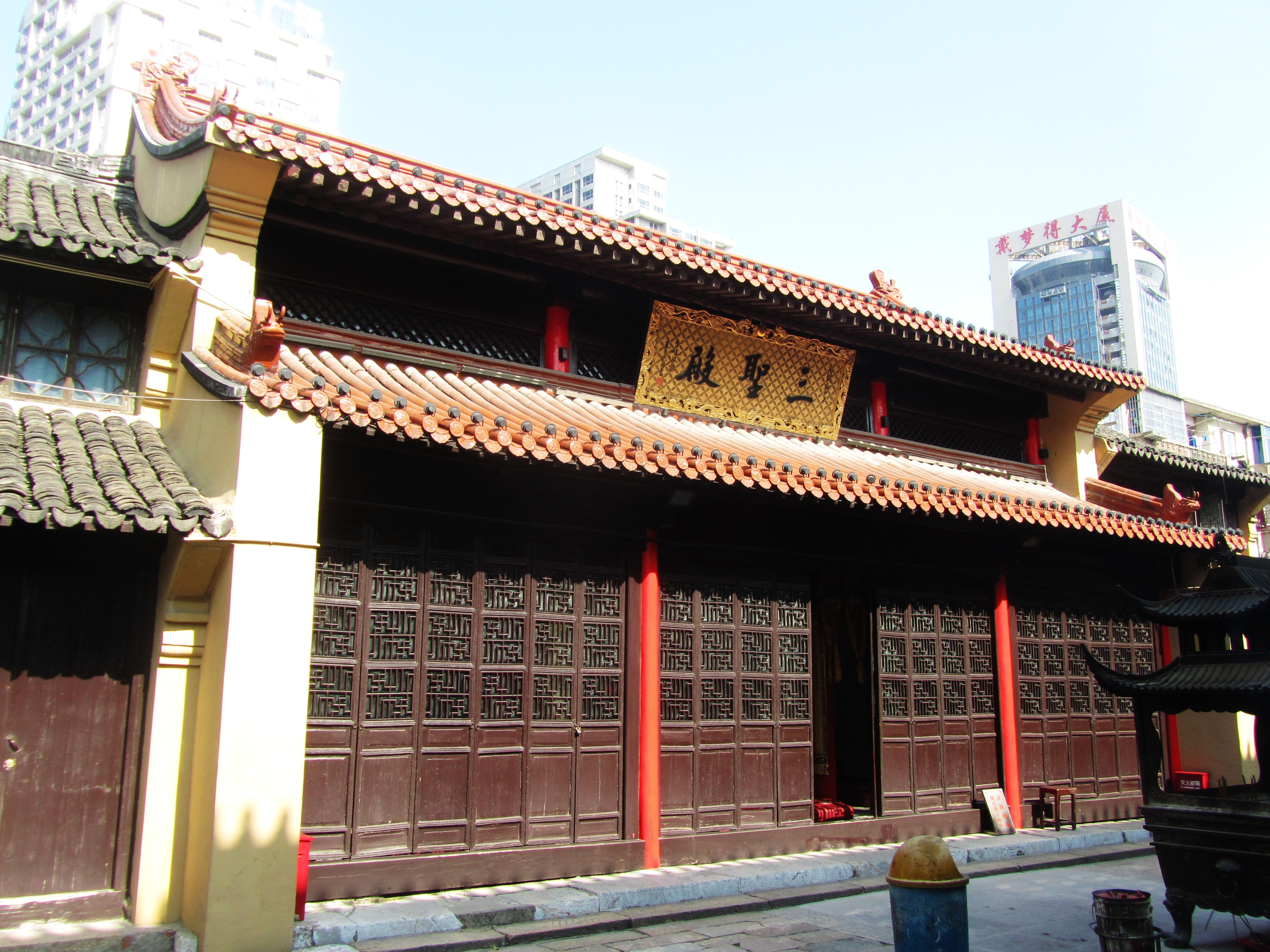
Hall of Three Saints
