= Jingang =

Jingang may refer to:

- Vajra, a ritual object known in Chinese religions as jingang
- Jingang, Liuyang, a town in Liuyang, Hunan, China
- Jingang Monastery, a Buddhist monastery in Kangding, Sichuan, China
