= Songbai Temple =

Buddhist temple in Hunan, China

- 松柏寺
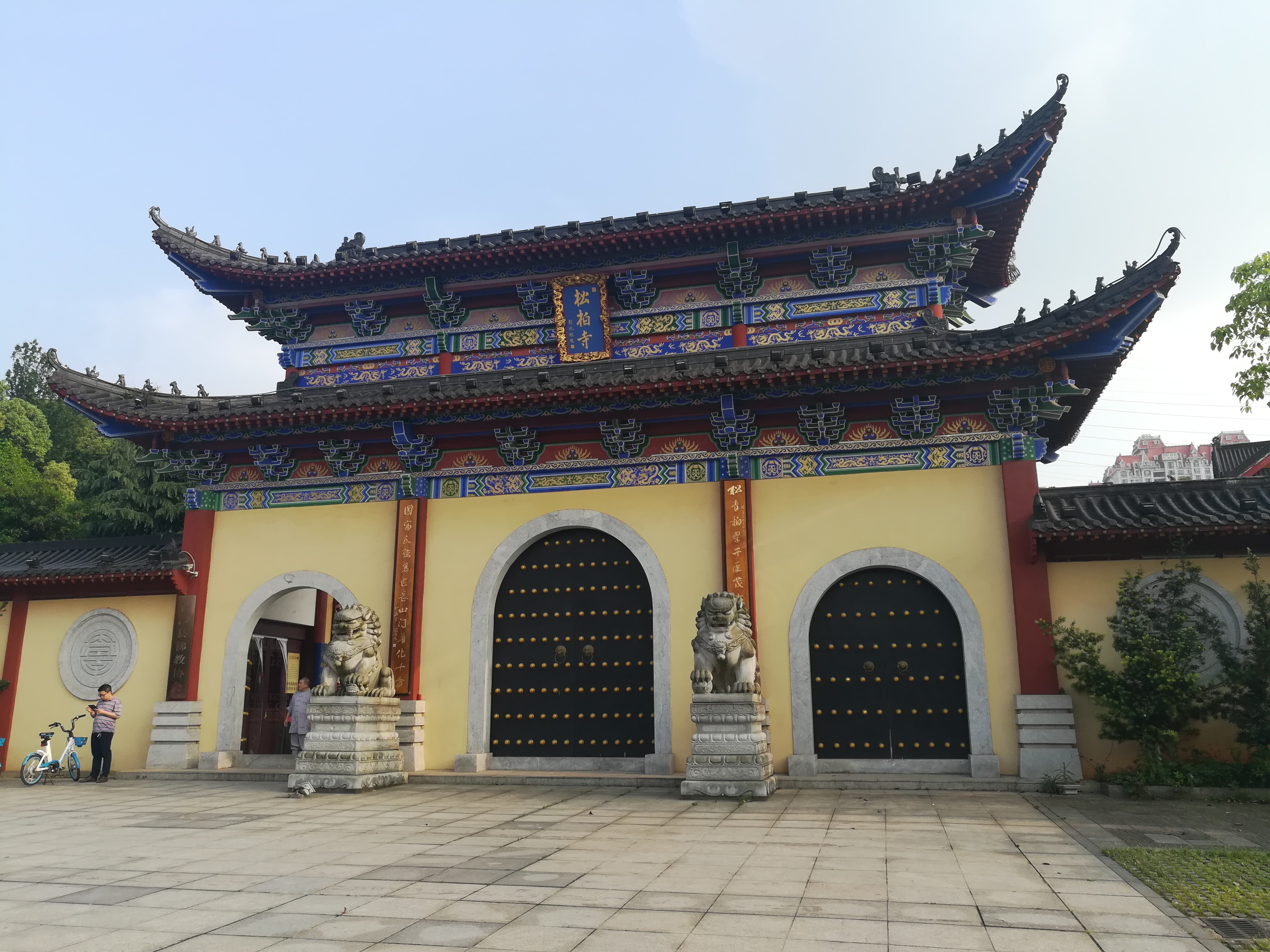
- The Shanmen of Songbai Temple.

- Location within Hunan

Religion
- Affiliation: Buddhism
- Sect: Chan Buddhism - Linji school
- Deity: Gautama Buddha, Amitābha and Bhaisajyaguru
- Leadership: Shi Zhaoguan (释照观)

Location
- Location: Changsha County, Hunan
- Country: China
- Coordinates: 28°14′28.04″N 113°04′05.08″E

Architecture
- Style: Chinese architecture
- Founder: Shi Xinlin (释心林)
- Established: 1067–1085
- Completed: 2002 (reconstruction)

Songbai Temple (Chinese: 松柏寺; pinyin: Sōngbǎi Sì) is a Buddhist temple located in Changsha County, Hunan, China.

== History ==
The original temple dates back to the 11th century, during the region of Shenzong Emperor (1067–1085) of the Song dynasty (960–1127). At that time, Chan master Yuanjian (圆鉴) resided in the temple, where he taught Chan Buddhism for many years, and attracted large numbers of practitioners. But because of war and natural disasters, it declined and was disappeared during the Republic of China. A modern restoration of the entire temple complex was carried out in 2002.

== Architecture ==
The complex include the following halls: Shanmen, Mahavira Hall, Hall of Four Heavenly Kings, Hall of Guanyin, Bell tower, Drum tower, Hall of Guru, Dharma Hall, Dining Room, etc.

== Gallery ==
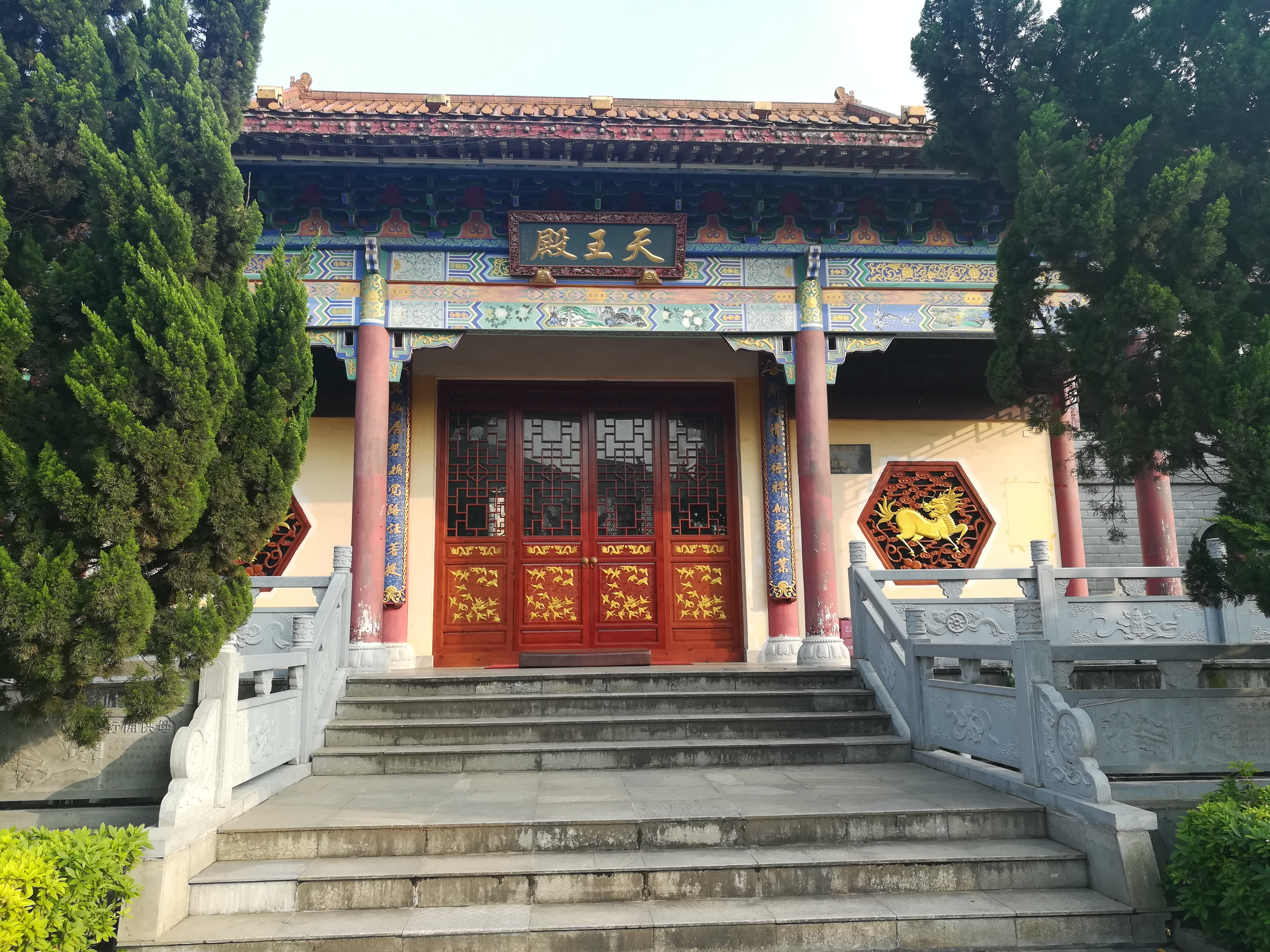
Hall of Four Heavenly Kings

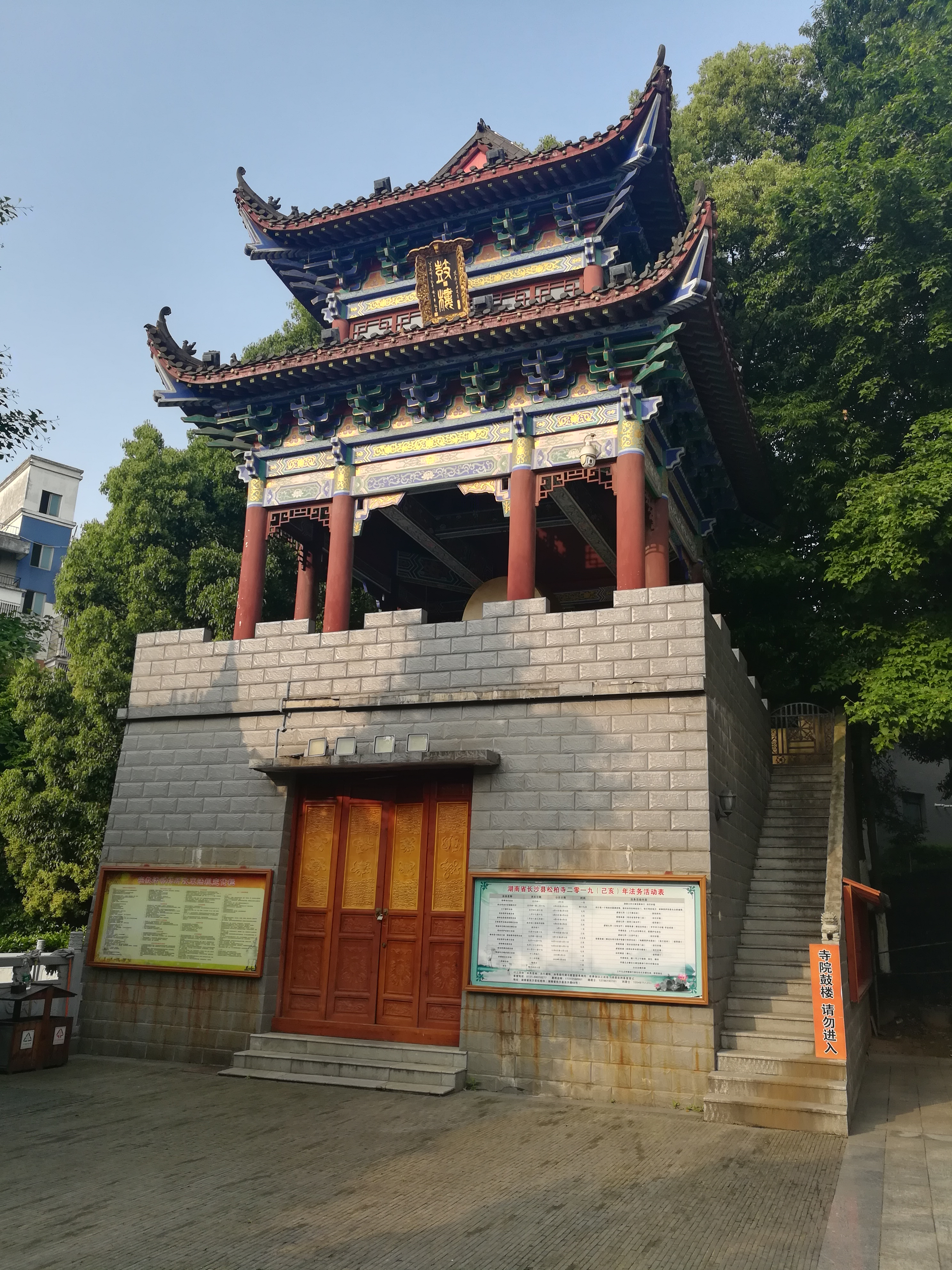
Drum tower

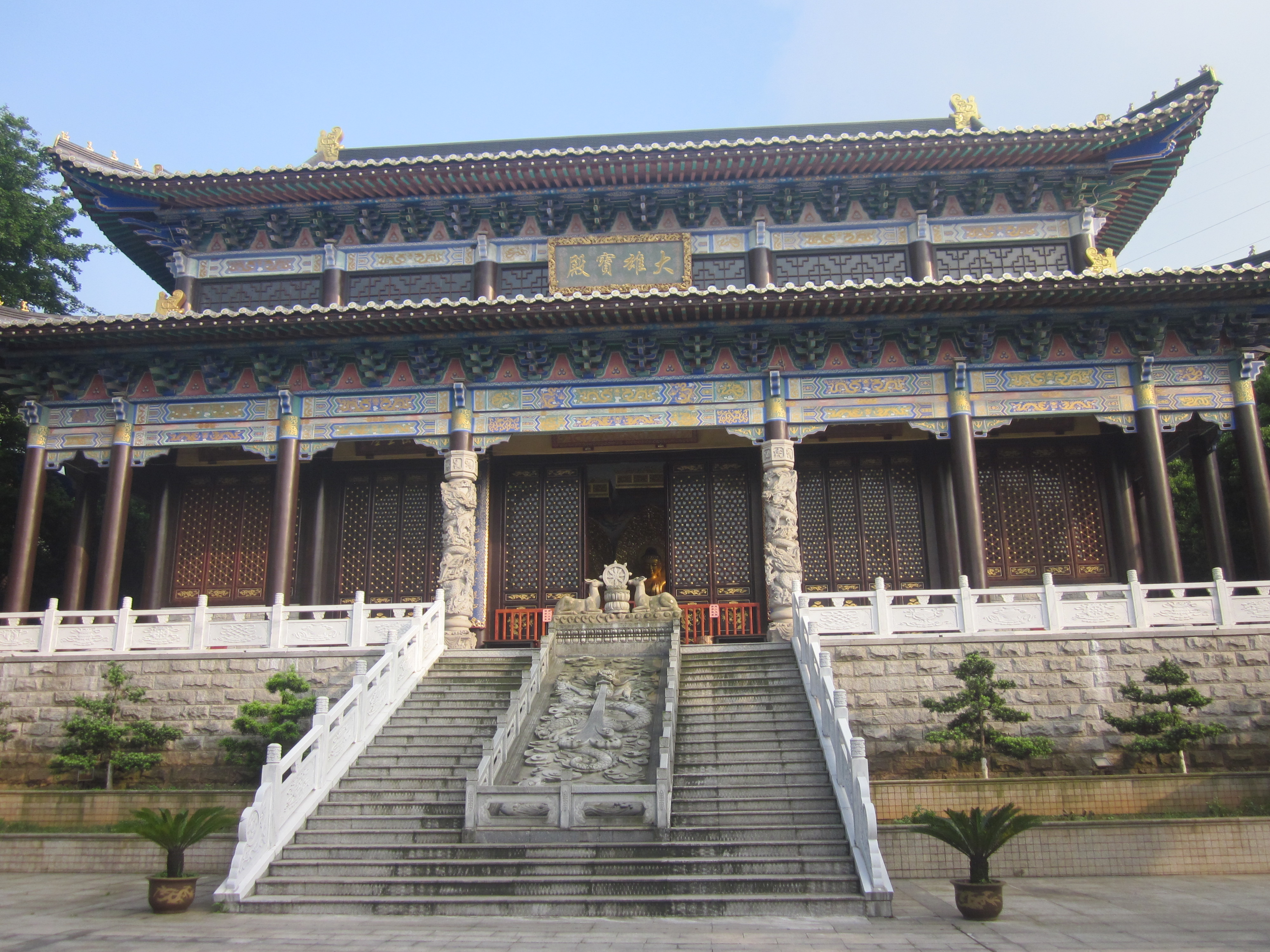
Mahavira Hall

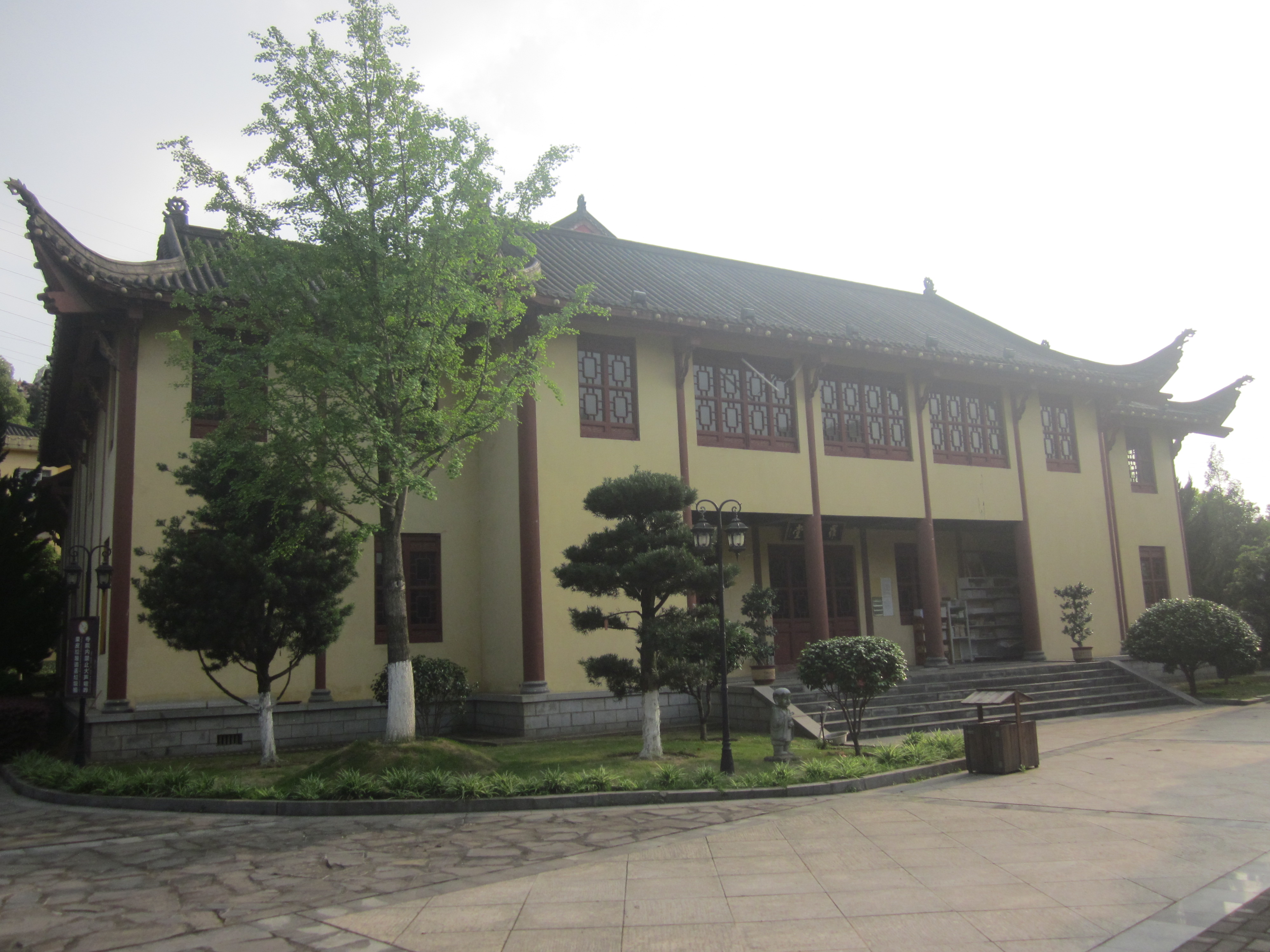
Arhat Hall.
