= Shishuang Temple =

Buddhist temple in Liuyang, Hunan, China

- 石霜寺
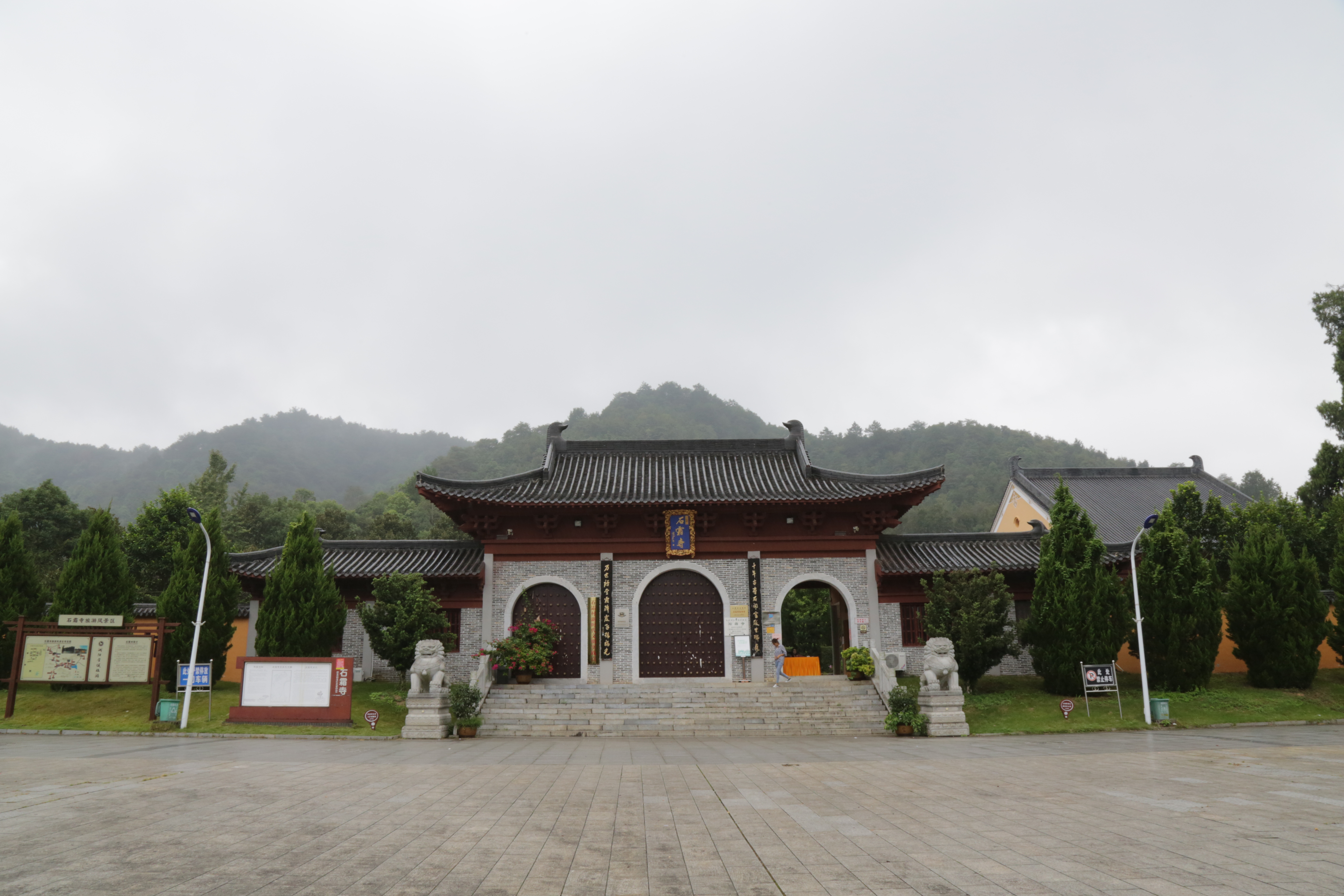
- The Shanmen Hall at Shishuang Temple.

- Location within Hunan Location within China

Religion
- Affiliation: Buddhism
- Deity: Linji school

Location
- Location: Jingang, Liuyang, Hunan, China
- Coordinates: 27°54′46″N 113°39′14″E

Architecture
- Style: Chinese architecture
- Founder: Pei Xiu
- Established: 874–888

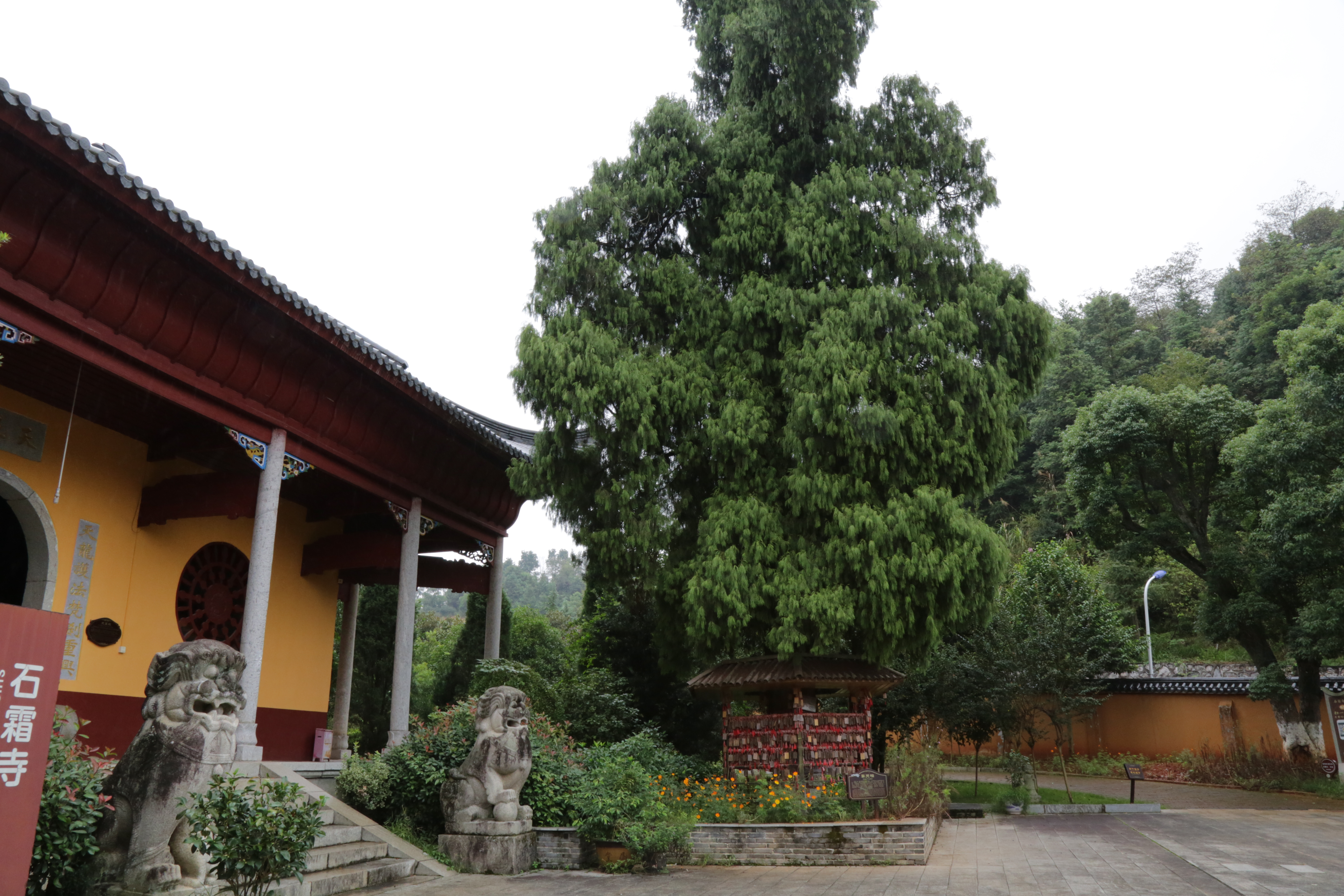
A thousand year old cypress in Shishuang Temple, planted by Tang dynasty Prime Minister Pei Xiu.

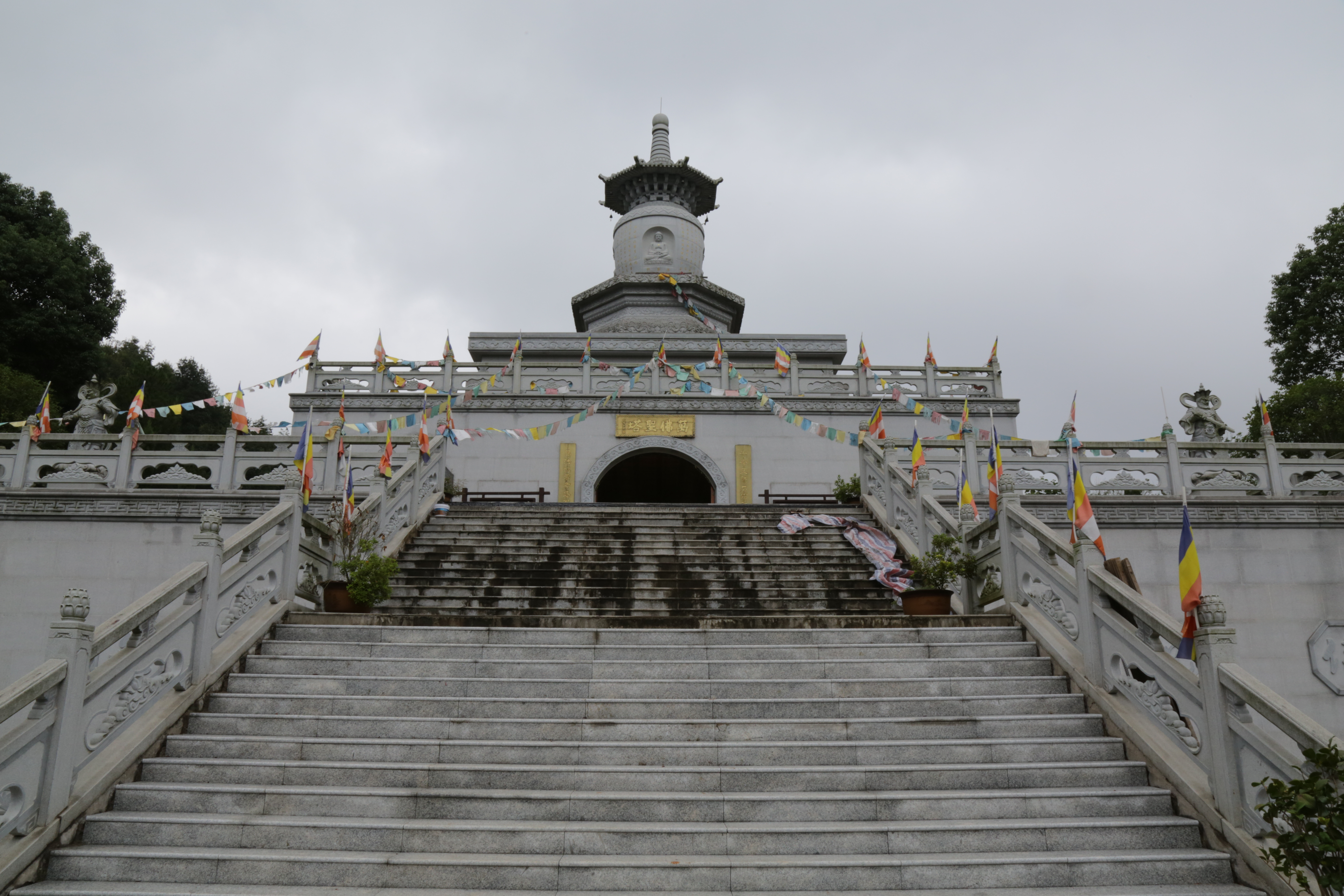
Ten Thousand Buddha Pagoda.

Shishuang Temple (Chinese: 石霜寺; pinyin: Shíshuāng Sì) is a Buddhist temple located in the town of Jingang, Liuyang, Hunan, China. In ancient times, Shishuang Temple, Daowu Temple (道吾寺), Baogai Temple (宝盖寺) and Daguang Temple (大光寺) were called "Four Buddhist Temples in Liuyang".

== History ==
Shishuang Temple was first built in the Qianfu period (874–888) of the Tang dynasty (618–907). Emperor Xizong granted the land and the then Prime Minister Pei Xiu supervised the construction of the temple. Li Zhen (李震), the third son of Emperor Xizong, received ordination as a monk at the temple.

During the Song dynasty (960–1279), Shishuang Chuyuan served as abbot. His disciples Yangqi Fanghui and Huanglong Huinan founded the Yangqi sect and Huanglong sect, respectively. Japanese monks Eisai and Garin (monk) came to the temple to study Linji school.

Shishuang Temple went into decline in the Yuan and Ming dynasties (1271–1644).

In 1735, in the 13th year of Yongzheng Emperor's reign during the Qing dynasty (1644–1911), monks rebuilt the Grand Buddha Hall. The Shanmen and corridor were restored in 1794, in the ruling of Qianlong Emperor. And the Great Mercy Pavilion was renovated in 1879.

In 1923, monks refurbished the Mahavira Hall.

After the Cultural Revolution, in 1978, the local government repaired the Shanmen, Four Heavenly Kings Hall, Mahavira Hall, Guanyin Hall, Jade Buddha Hall, Buddhist Texts Library, Guru Hall, etc. In 1991, Shi Weiyi (释唯一), a Taiwanese monk, raised funds to build the Shanmen Hall. The Dining Hall and Meditation Hall were added to the temple in 1993. In 2014, Shishuang Temple has been categorized as an AAA level tourist site by the China National Tourism Administration.

== Architecture ==
The entire temple faces south with the Shanmen, Four Heavenly Kings Hall, Mahavira Hall, and the Guanyin Hall along the central axis of the complex. There are over 10 halls and rooms on both sides, including Guru Hall, Jade Buddha Hall, Abbot Hall, Monastic Dining Hall, Monastic Reception Hall and Meditation Hall.

=== Ten Thousand Buddha Pagoda ===
Ten thousand of golden and spectacular small Buddha statues are enshrined on the walls of the Ten Thousand Buddha Pagoda.

== Gallery ==
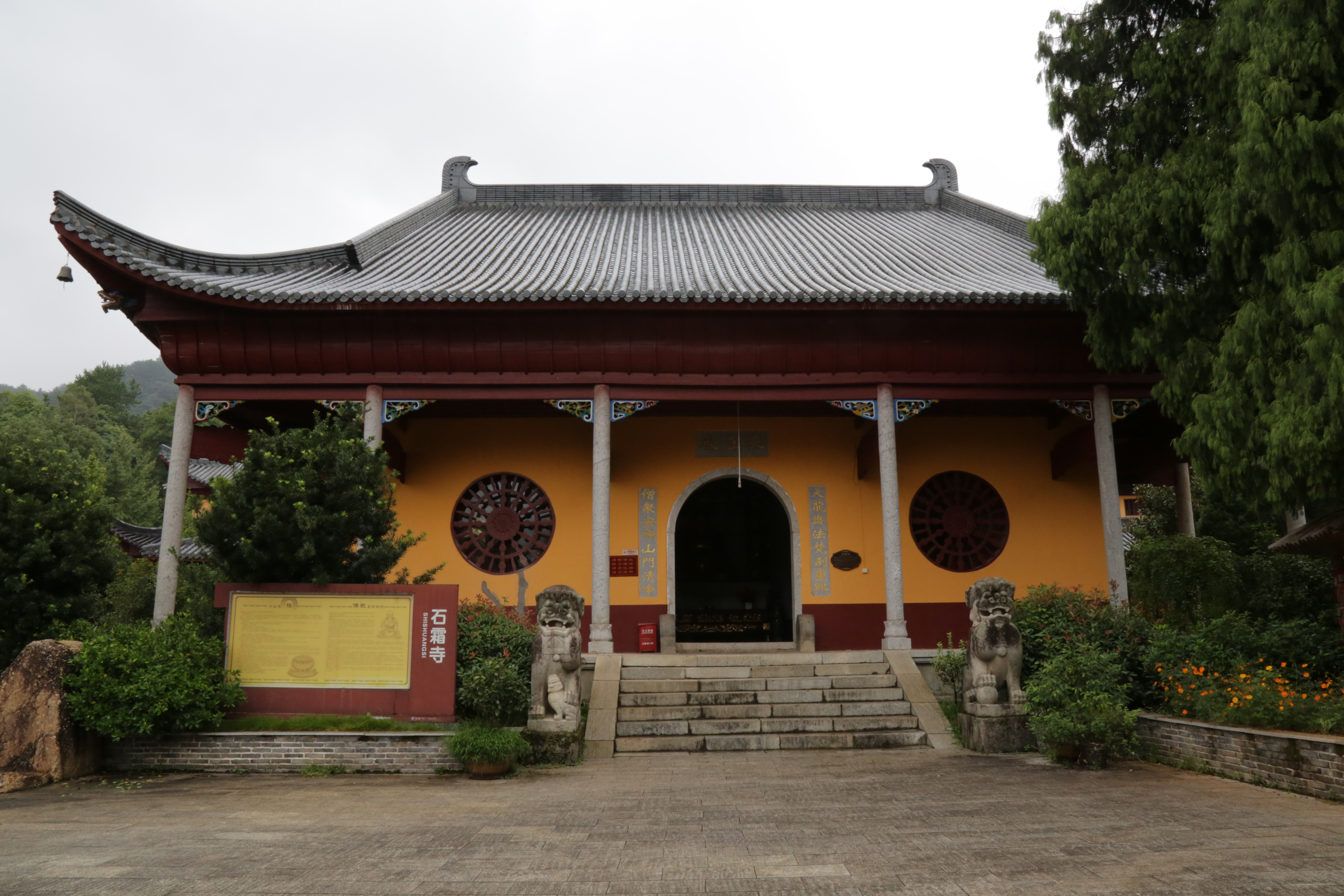
Four Heavenly Kings Hall

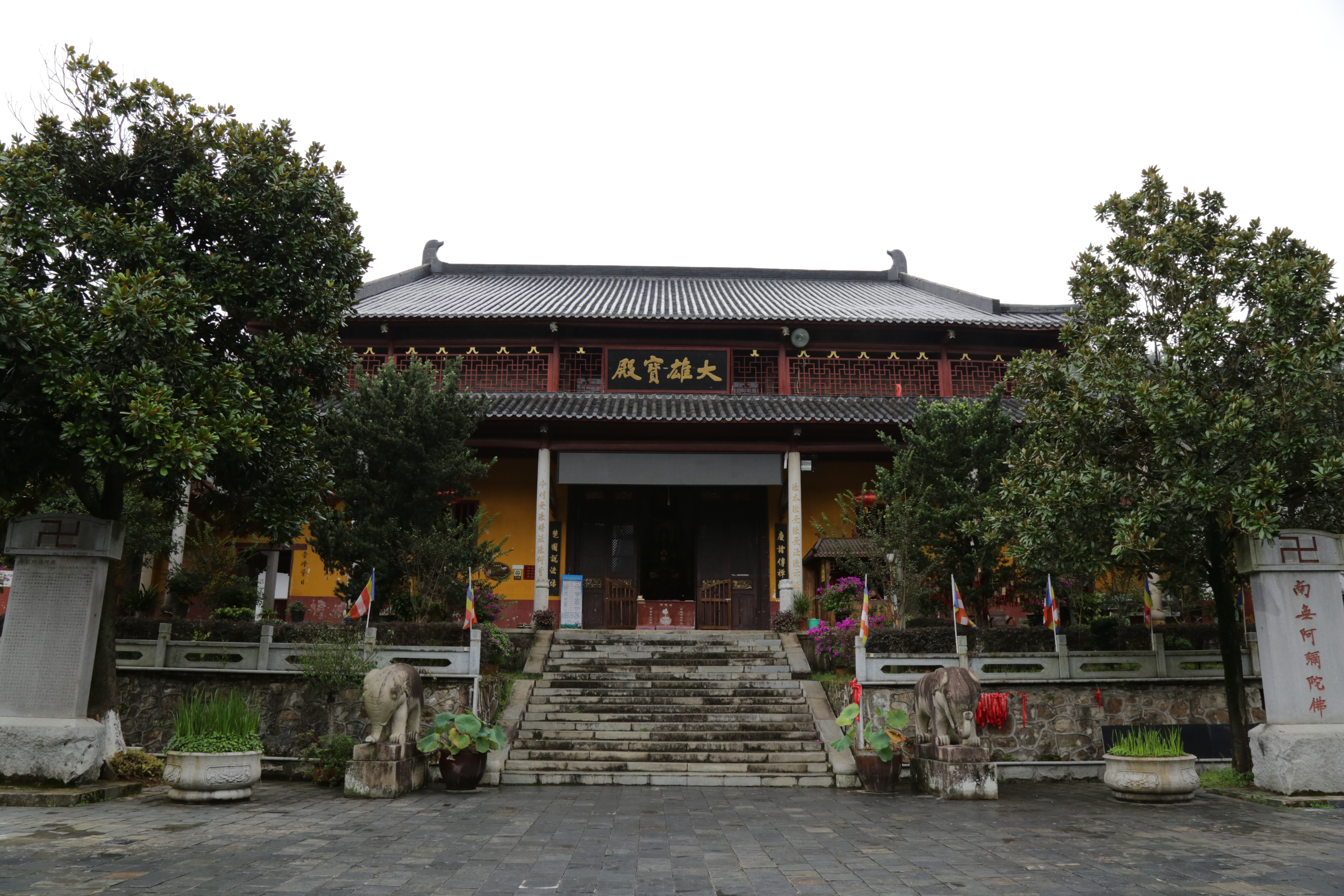
Mahavira Hall

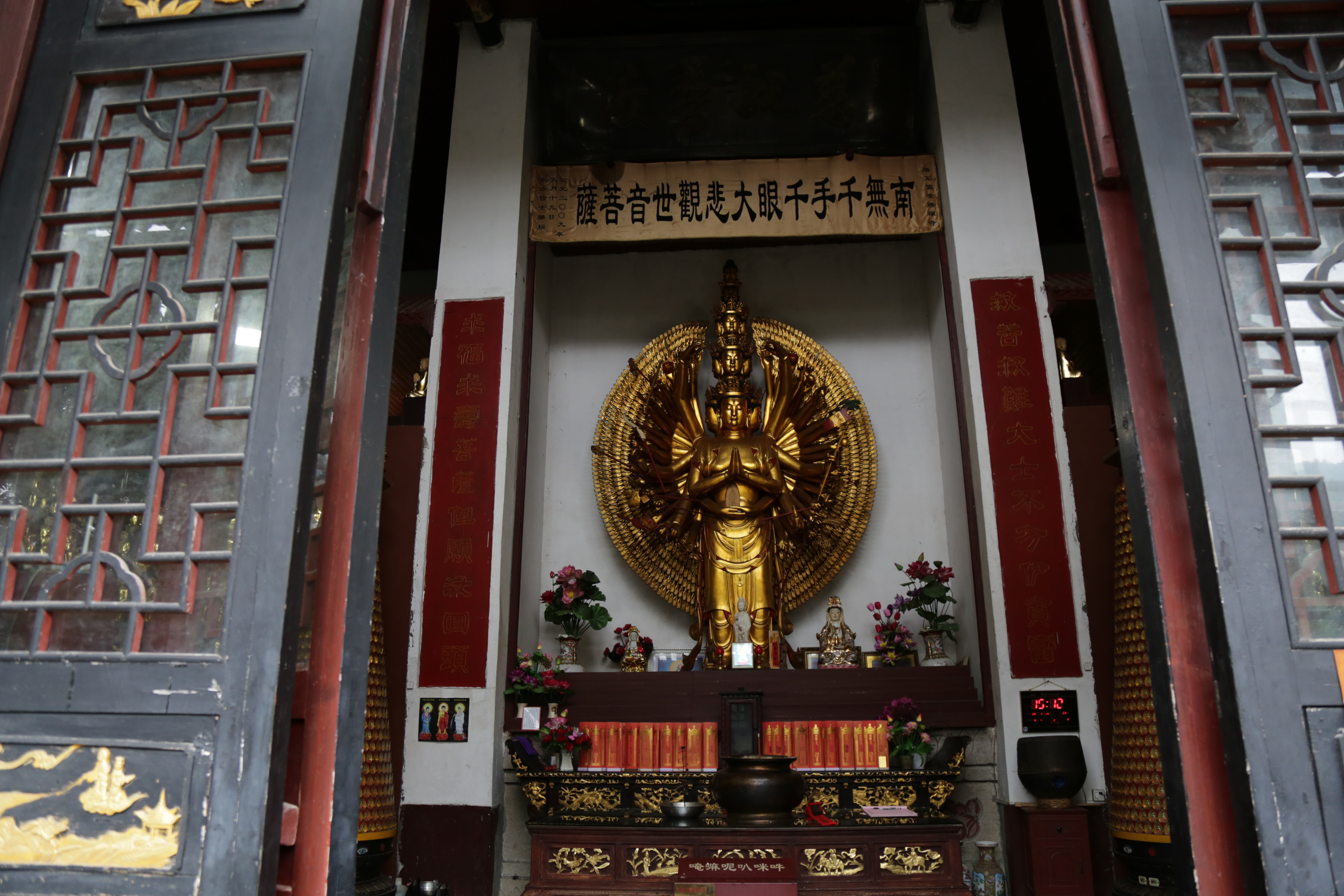
Guanyin Hall

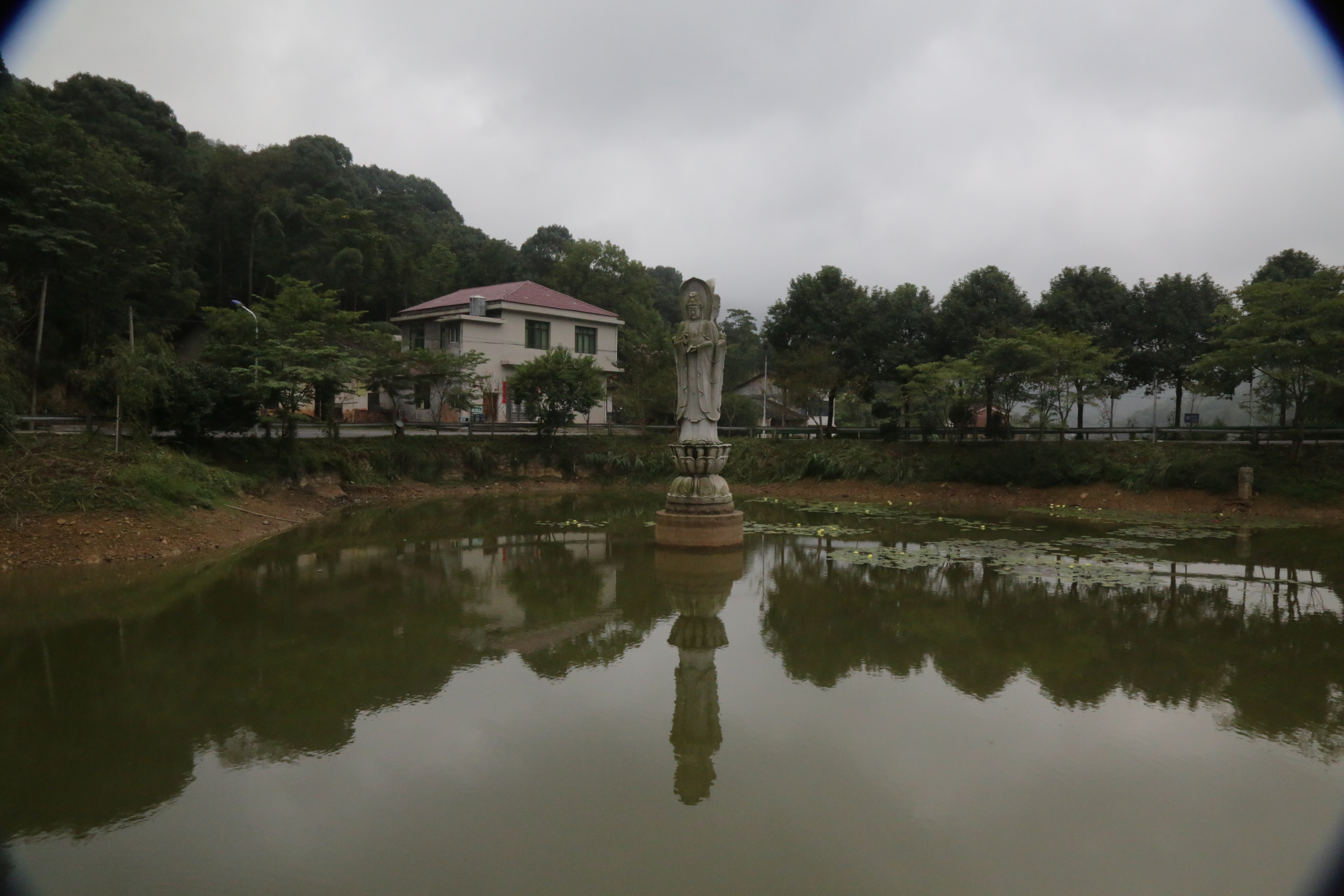
Free Life Pond

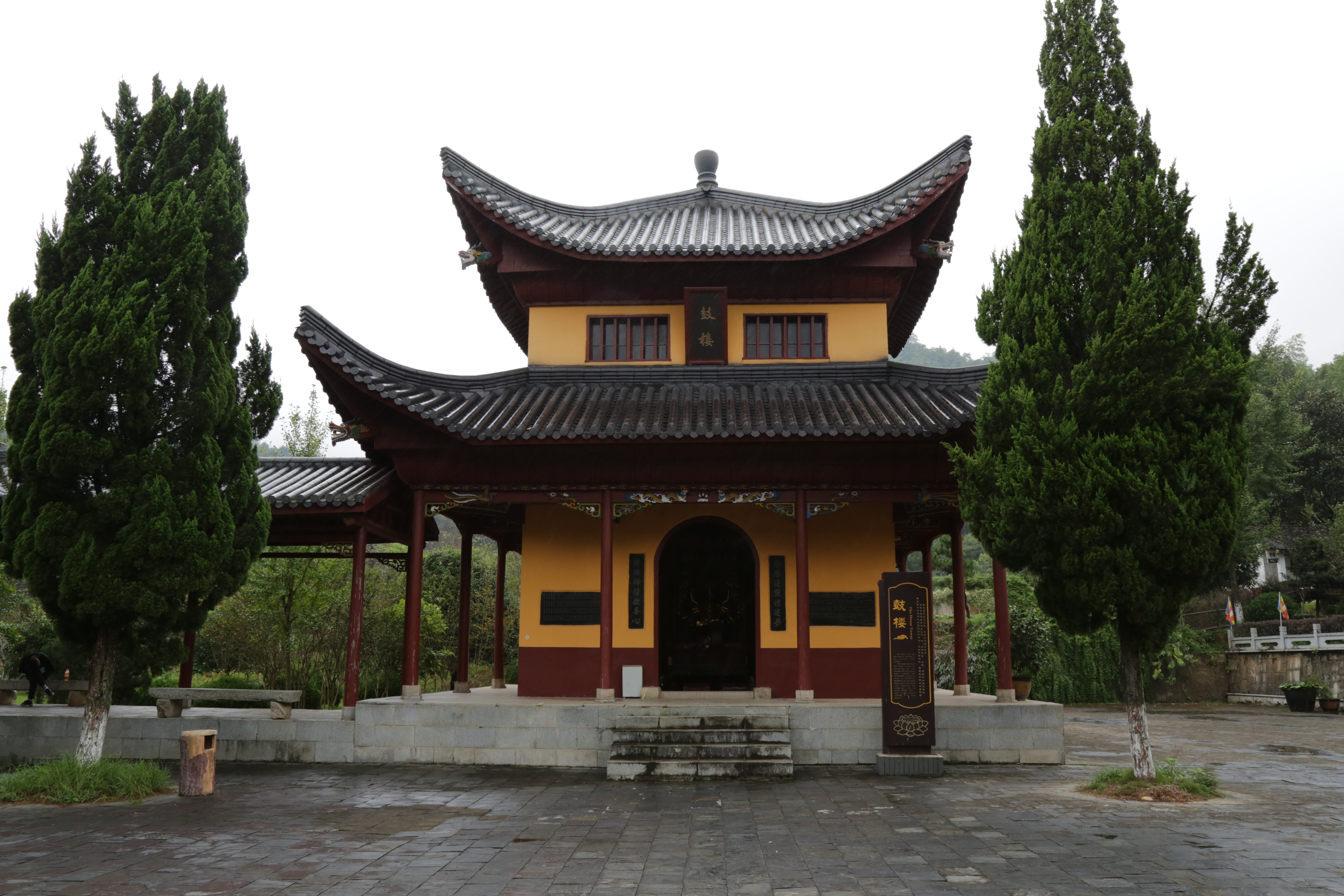
Drum Tower

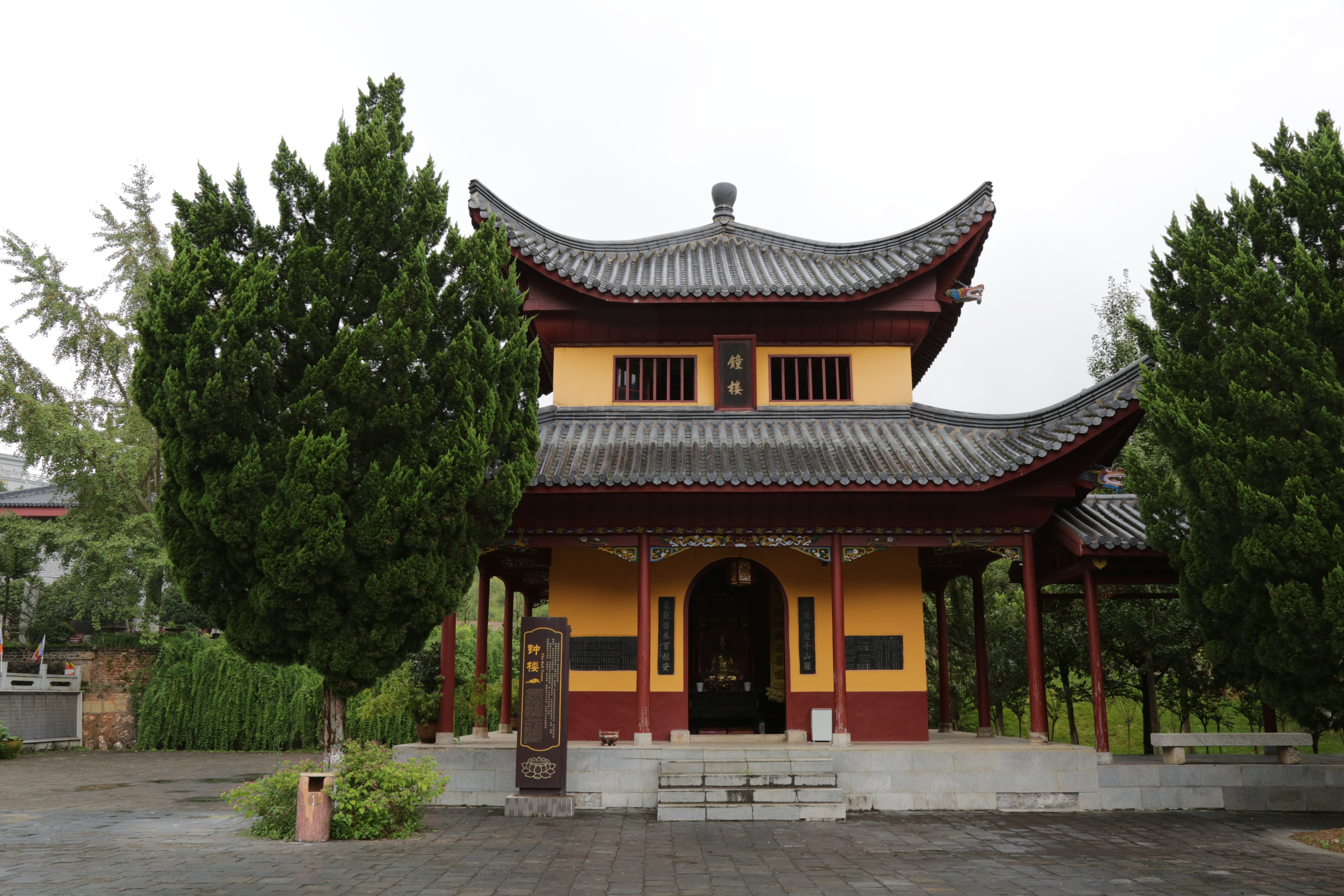
Bell Tower
