= Drum tower (Chinese Buddhism) =

Constituent building of Han Chinese Buddhist temples

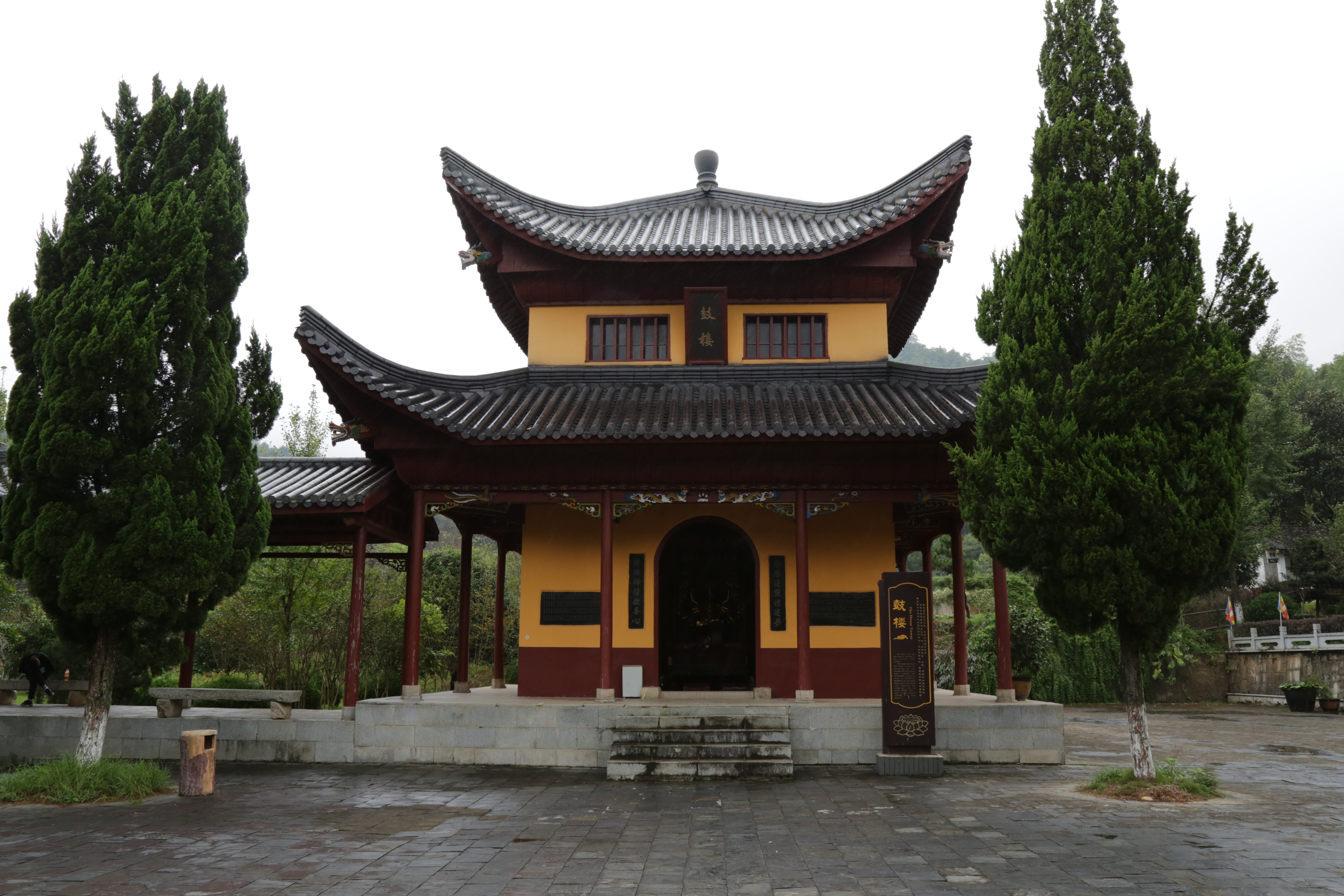
- The Drum tower at Shishuang Temple, in Liuyang, Hunan, China.

Chinese name
- Traditional Chinese: 鼓樓
- Simplified Chinese: 鼓楼
- Literal meaning: Drum tower
Transcriptions
Standard Mandarin
- Hanyu Pinyin: Gǔlóu

Korean name
- Hangul: 고루

Japanese name
- Kanji: 鼓樓
- Kana: ころう

The drum tower is an important building in Han Chinese Buddhist temples. Together with a bell tower, they are usually placed on both sides of the Hall of Four Heavenly Kings. It is usually located on the right side while the bell tower is usually located on the left side. Generally, it is a three-storey pavilion with a big drum placed on it. When it is beaten, it sounds grandly and loudly. Buddhist temples set times to beat the drums to inform the time and also wake people up.

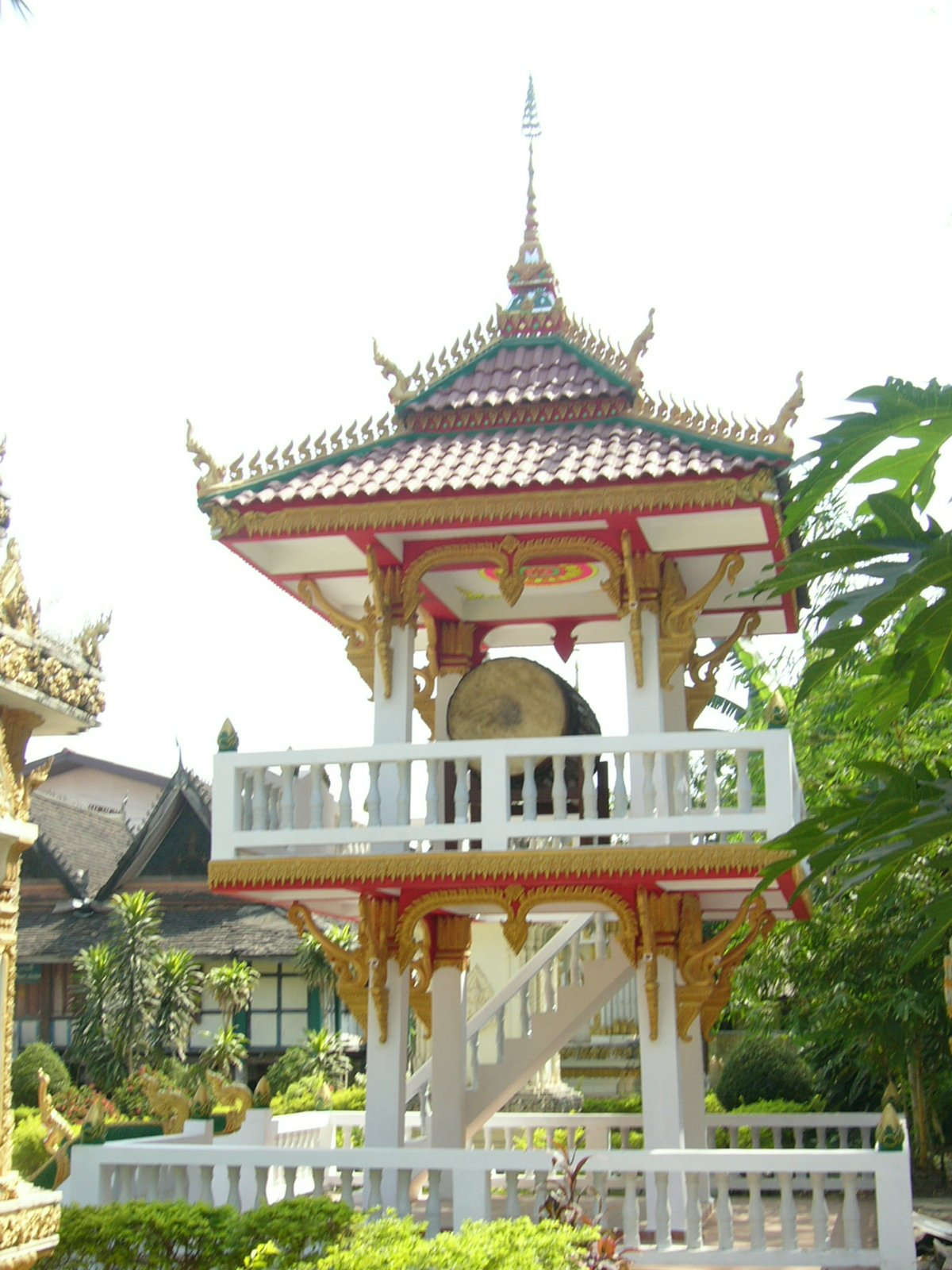
Drum tower in Laos

They are found in China and other countries of the region.
