= Mount Zhao =

Mountain in Hunan, China

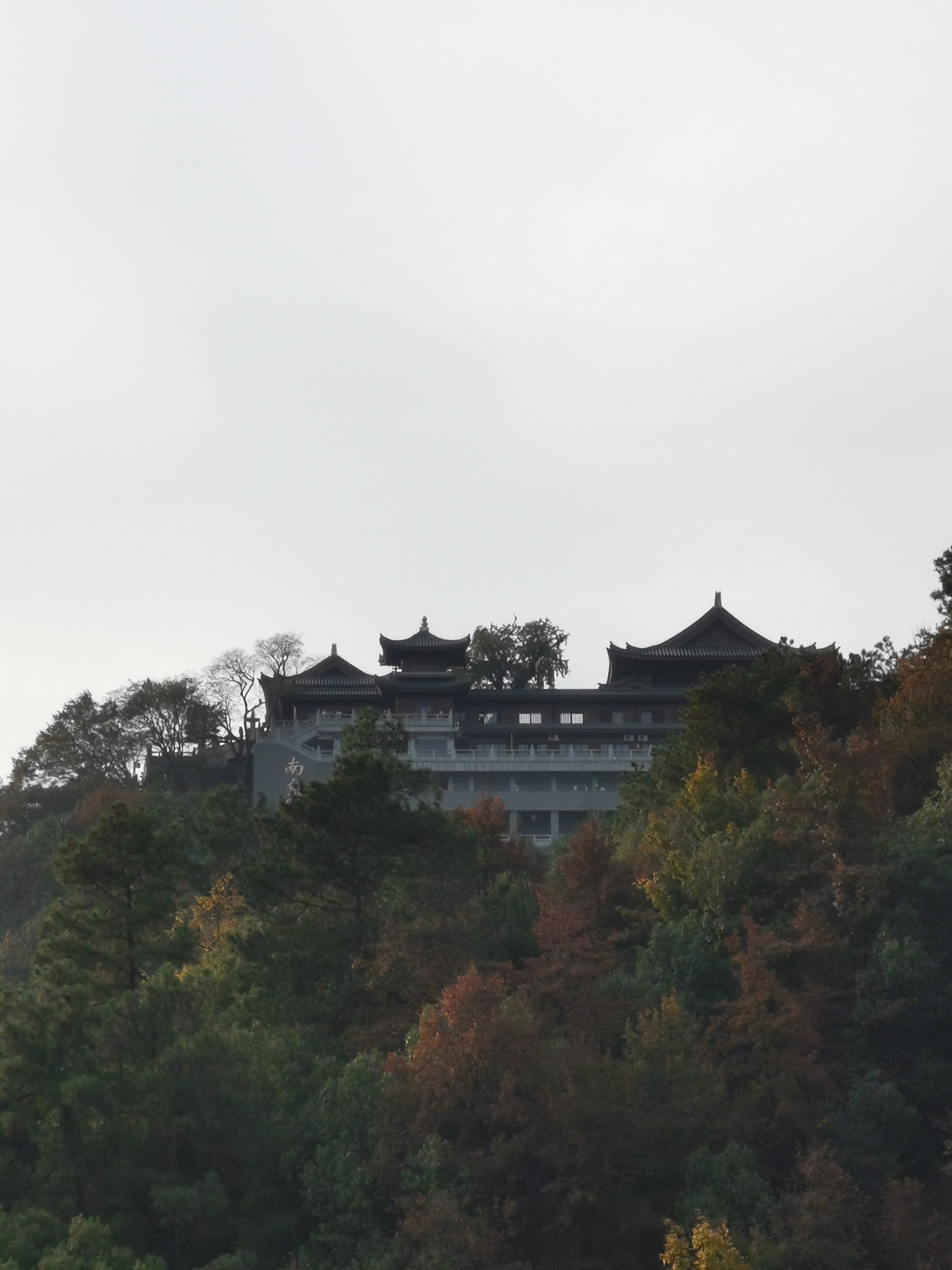
- Zhaoshan Temple on Mount Zhao

Highest point
- Elevation: 185-metre (607 ft)
- Coordinates: 27°58′26″N 113°01′01″E

Naming
- Native name: 昭山 (Chinese)

Geography
- Location within Hunan
- Location: Yuetang District, Xiangtan, Hunan, China

Mount Zhao (Chinese: 昭山; pinyin: Zhāo Shān) is a 185 metres (607 ft) mountain on the border of Xiangtan and Changsha in Hunan, China. Towering by riverside of the Xiang River, it has guarded the estuary of Xiang River and controlled the center of Hunan. It has been designated as a provincial-level scenery area by the government of Hunan in 1991 for its long history, superb environment, unique landscape and cultural attraction.

== Etymology ==
It was named because King Zhao of Zhou (about 977/75–957 BC) paid a visit to it.

== History ==
With 3,000 years of history, Mount Zhao enjoys flourishing and profound culture. Over 100 celerities indifferent dynasties paid a visit and left the descendants with over 150 poems and paintings, and some 70 ancient steles and architectural relics. In the Northern Song dynasty (960–1127), Mi Fu, a famous calligrapher and painter, painted The temple in the mountain, which was known as one scene of Eight Views of Xiaoxiang in ancient China and East Asia. In the Qing dynasty (1644–1911), Wang Fuzhi and Wang Kaiyun used to climb up the mountain.

New it has been categorized as an AAAA-level tourist site by the China National Tourism Administration.

== Culture ==
Zhaoshan Temple and Guanyin Temple are Buddhist temples on the mountain.

== Gallery ==
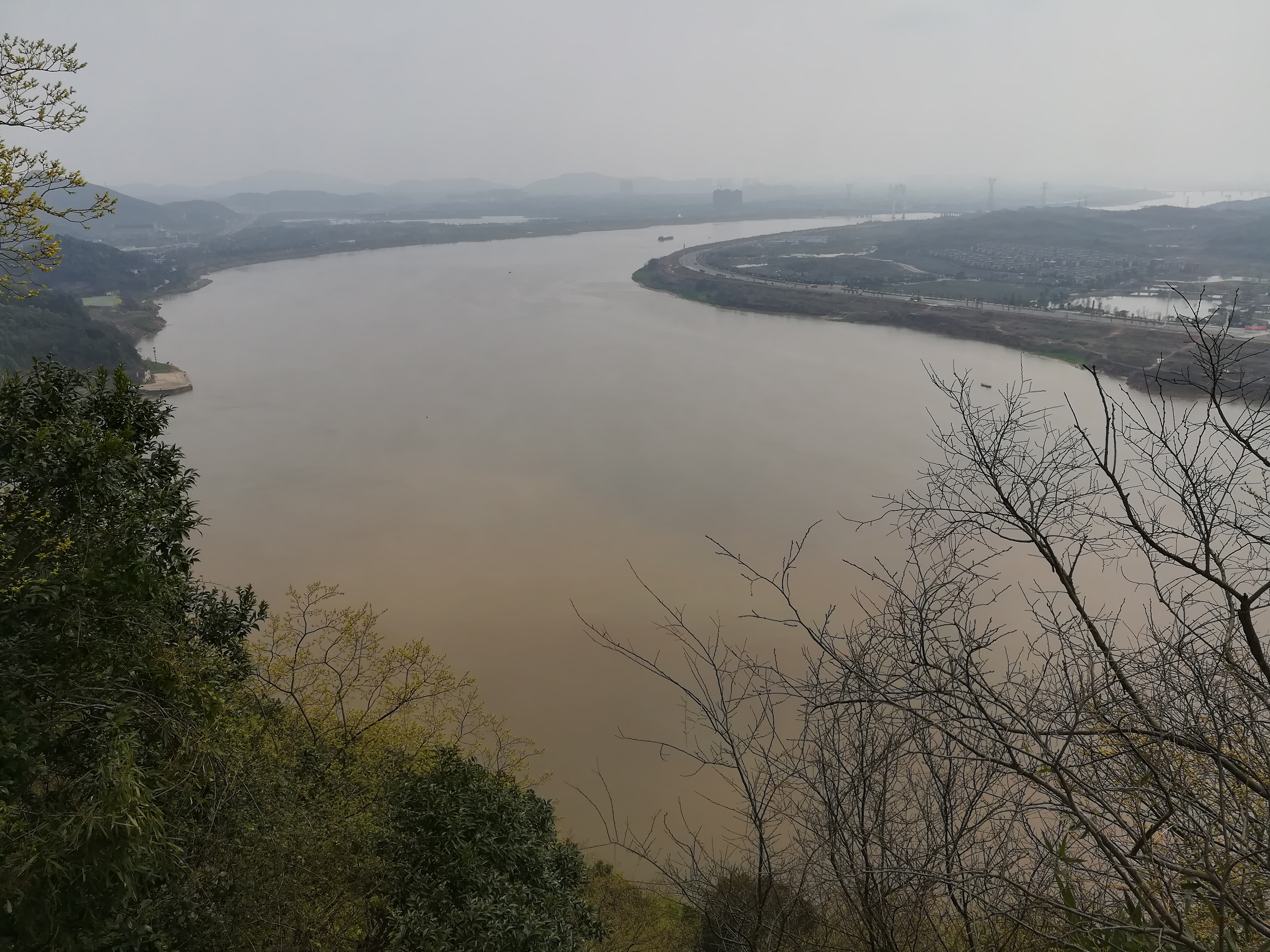
Overlooking Xiang River from Mount Zhao

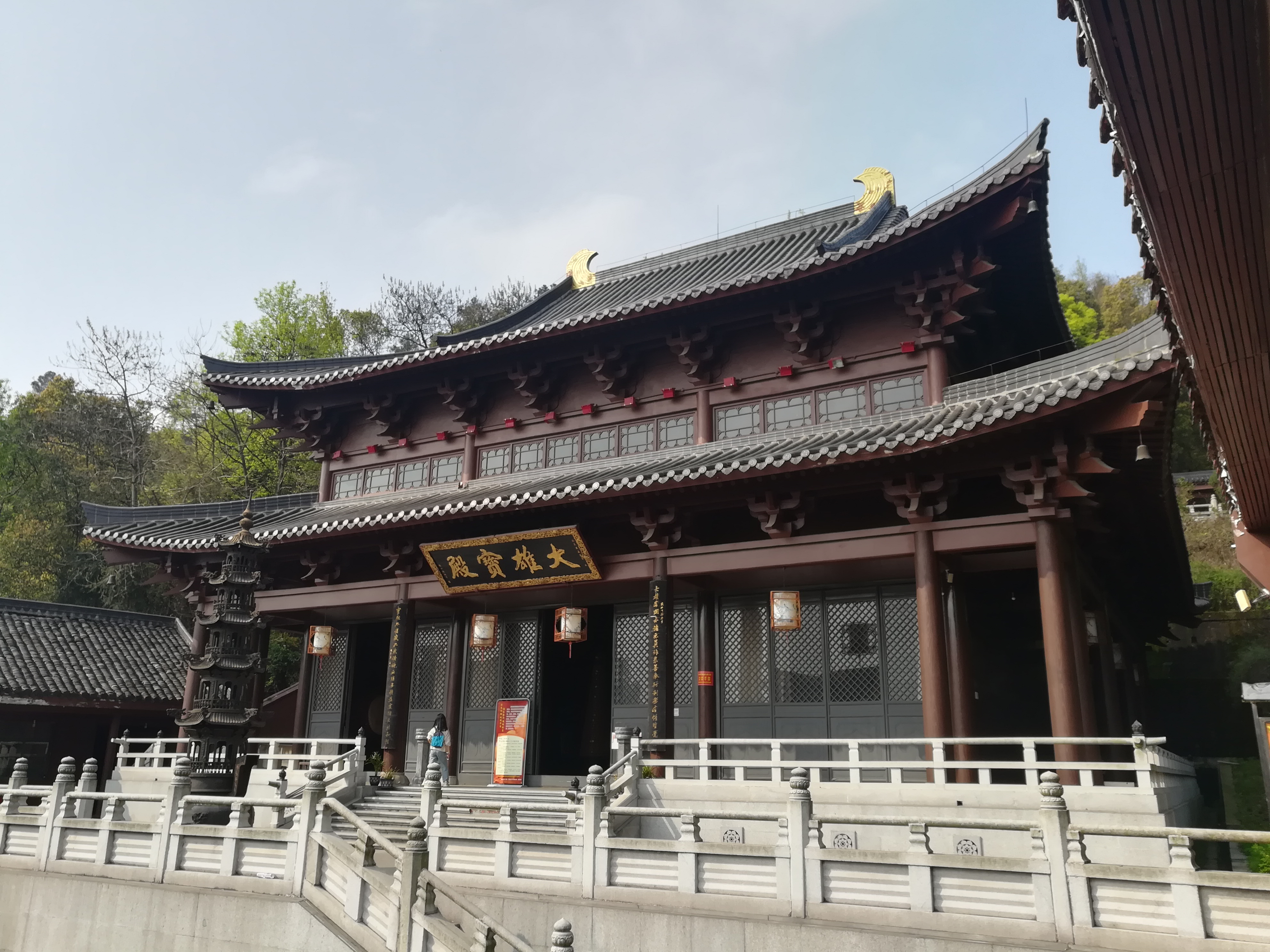
Mahavira Hall, Guanyin Temple

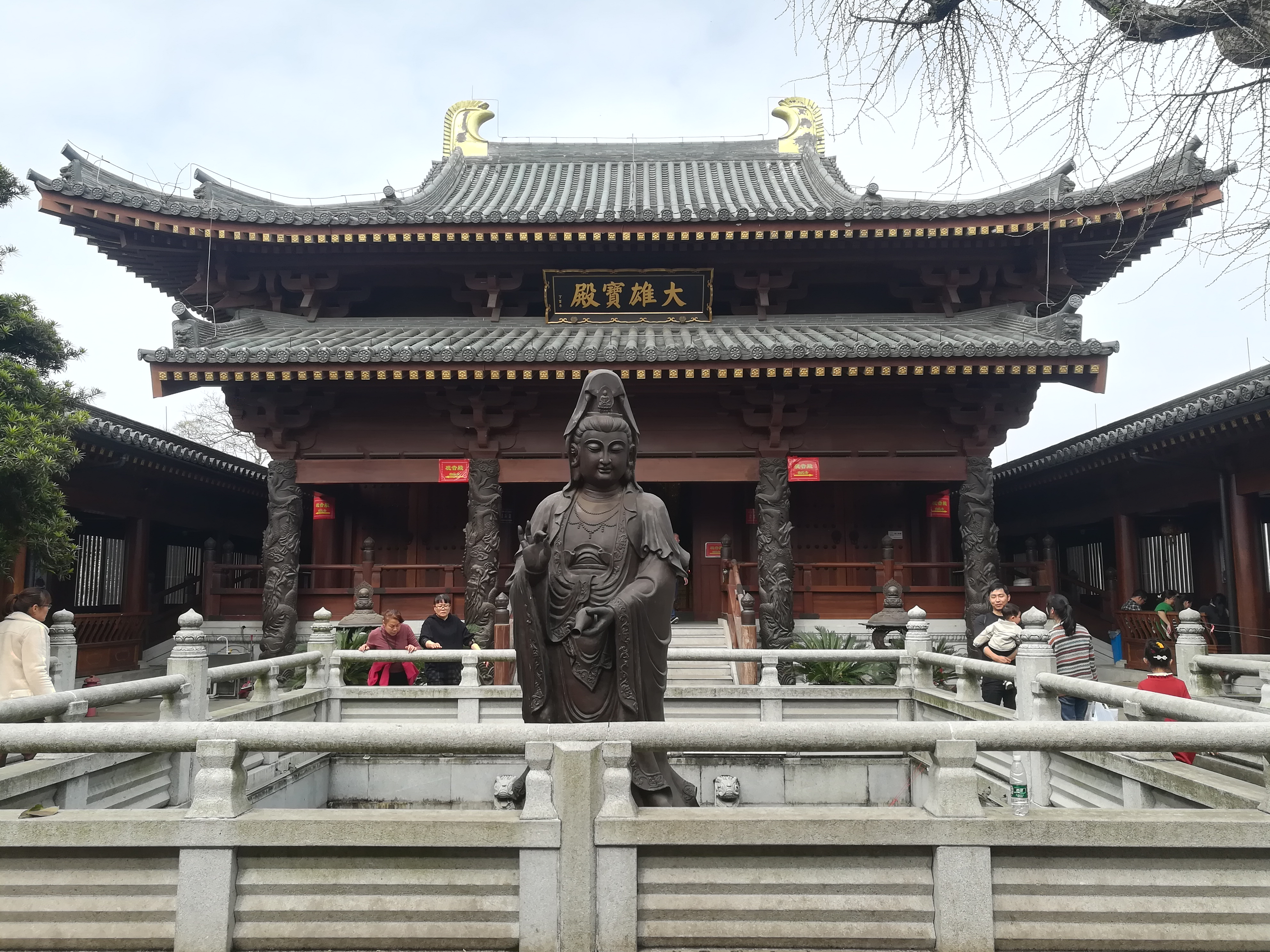
Mahavira Hall, Zhaoshan Temple
