= Jingang, Liuyang =

Jingang Town 金刚镇
- Town
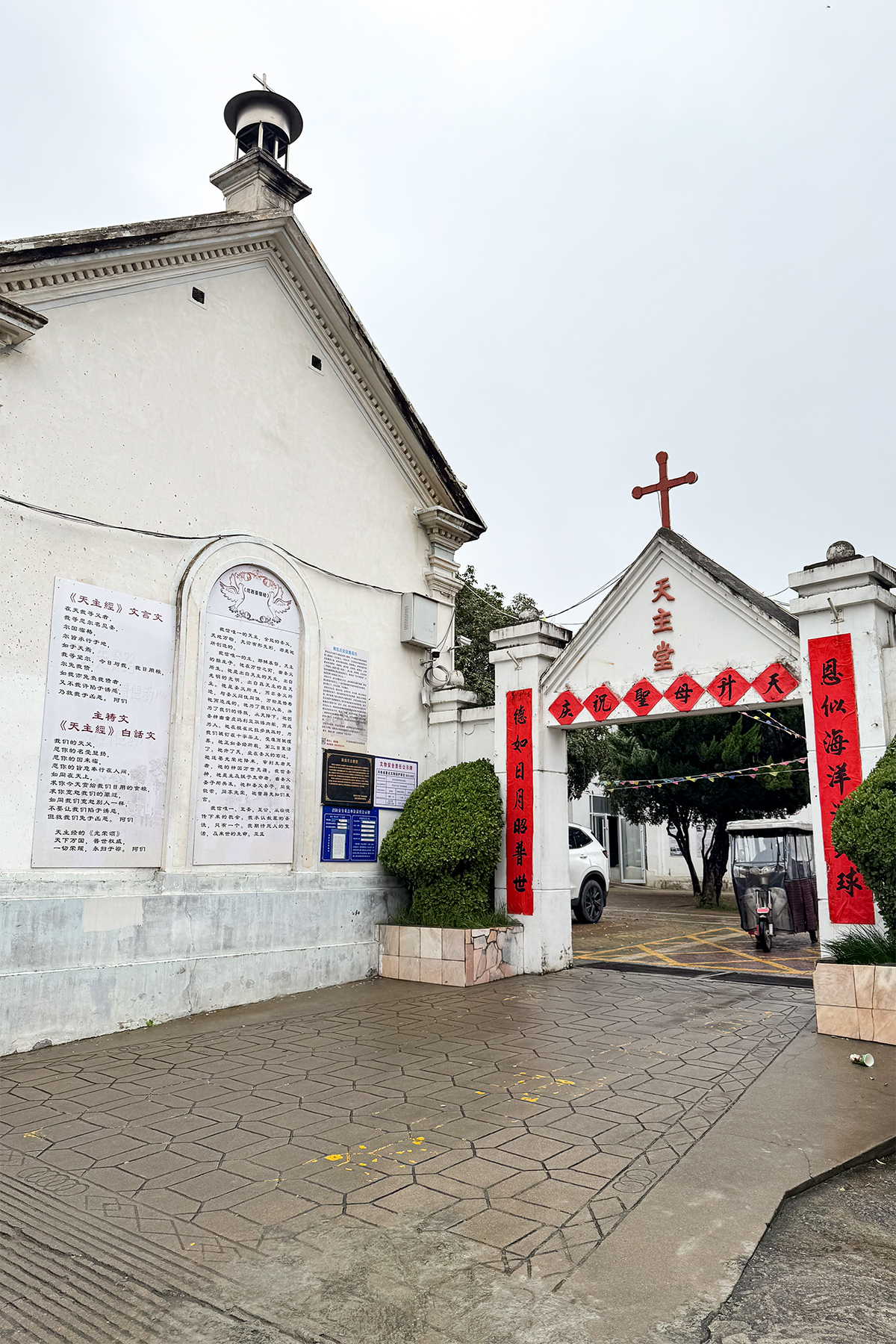
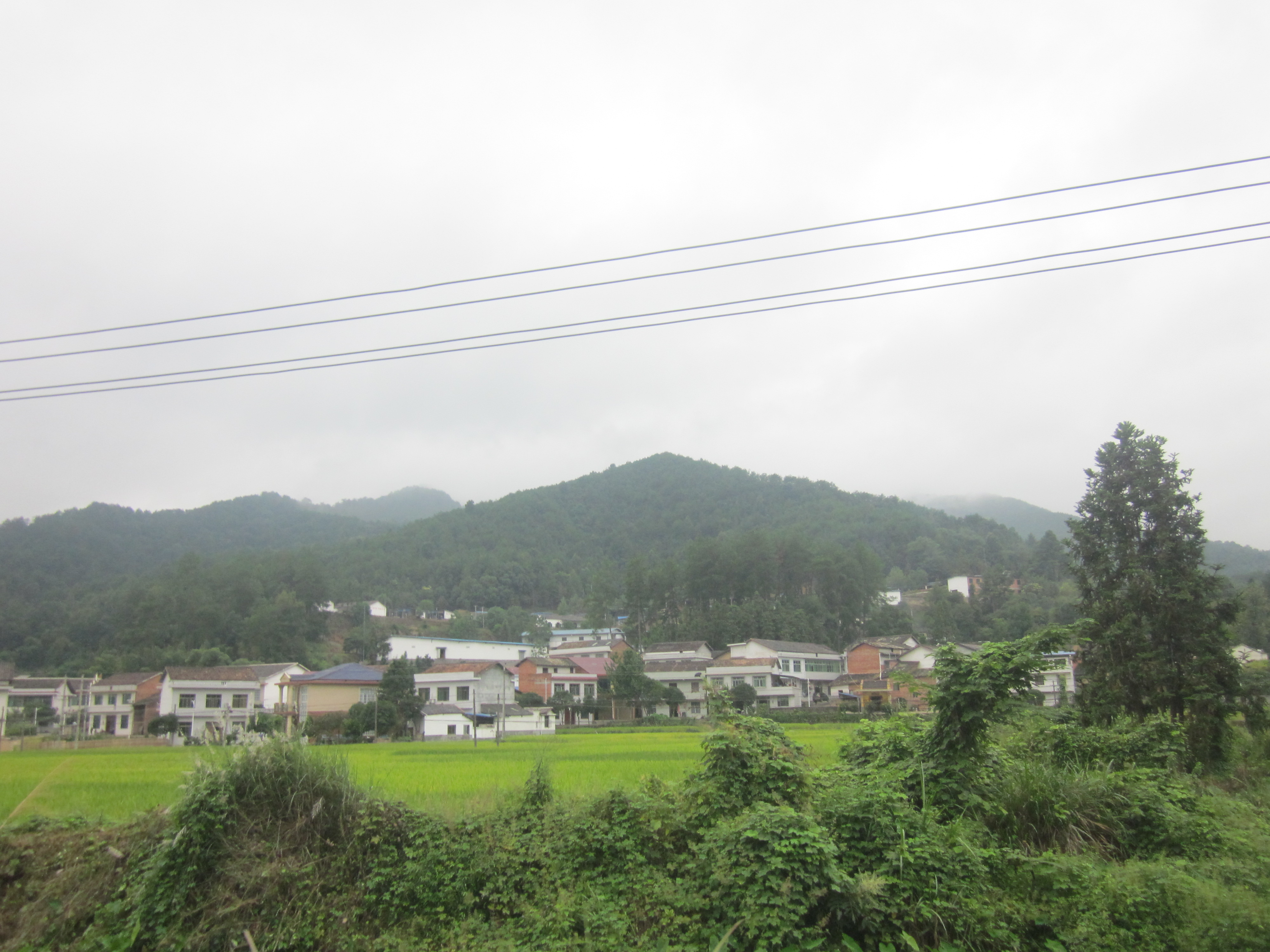
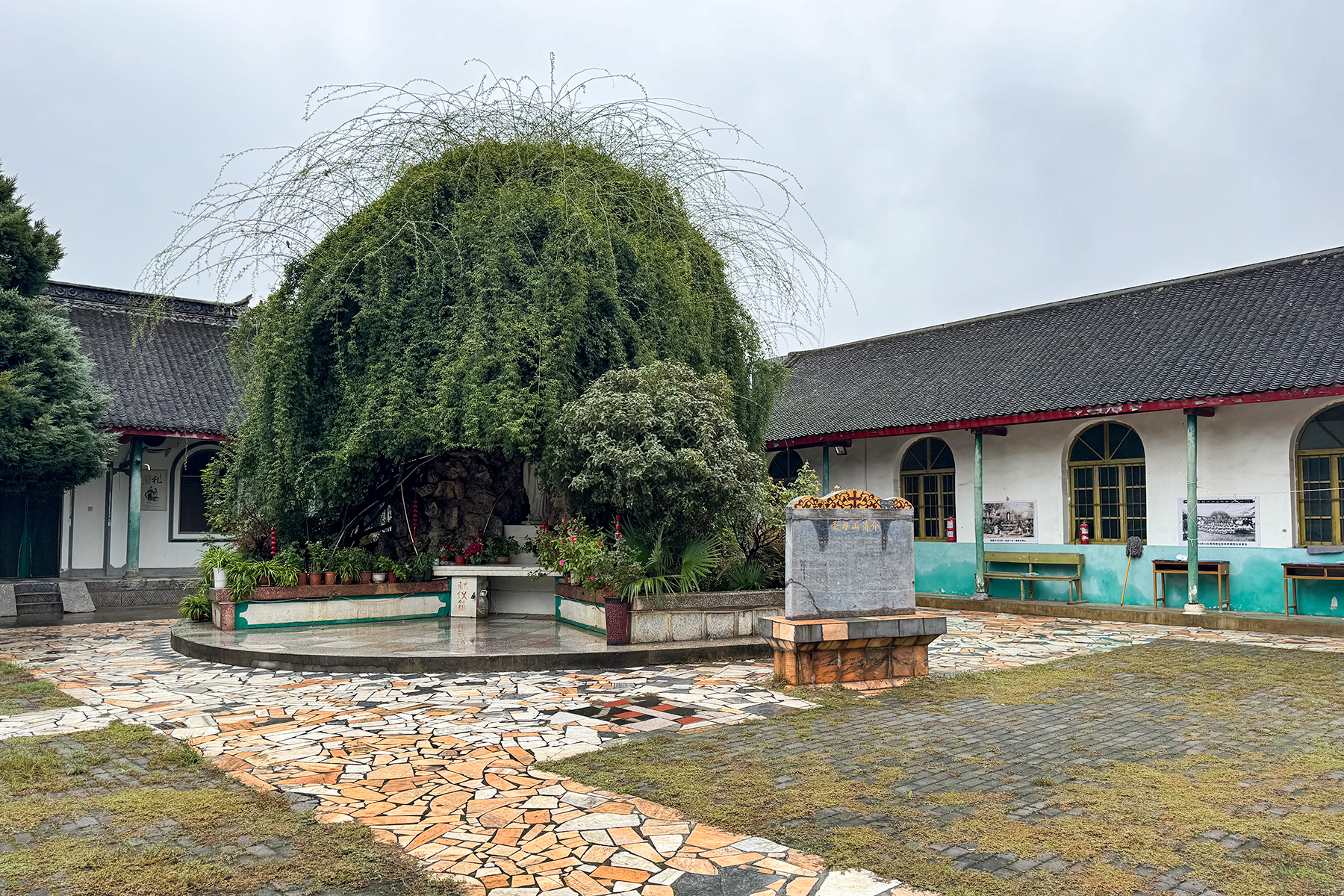
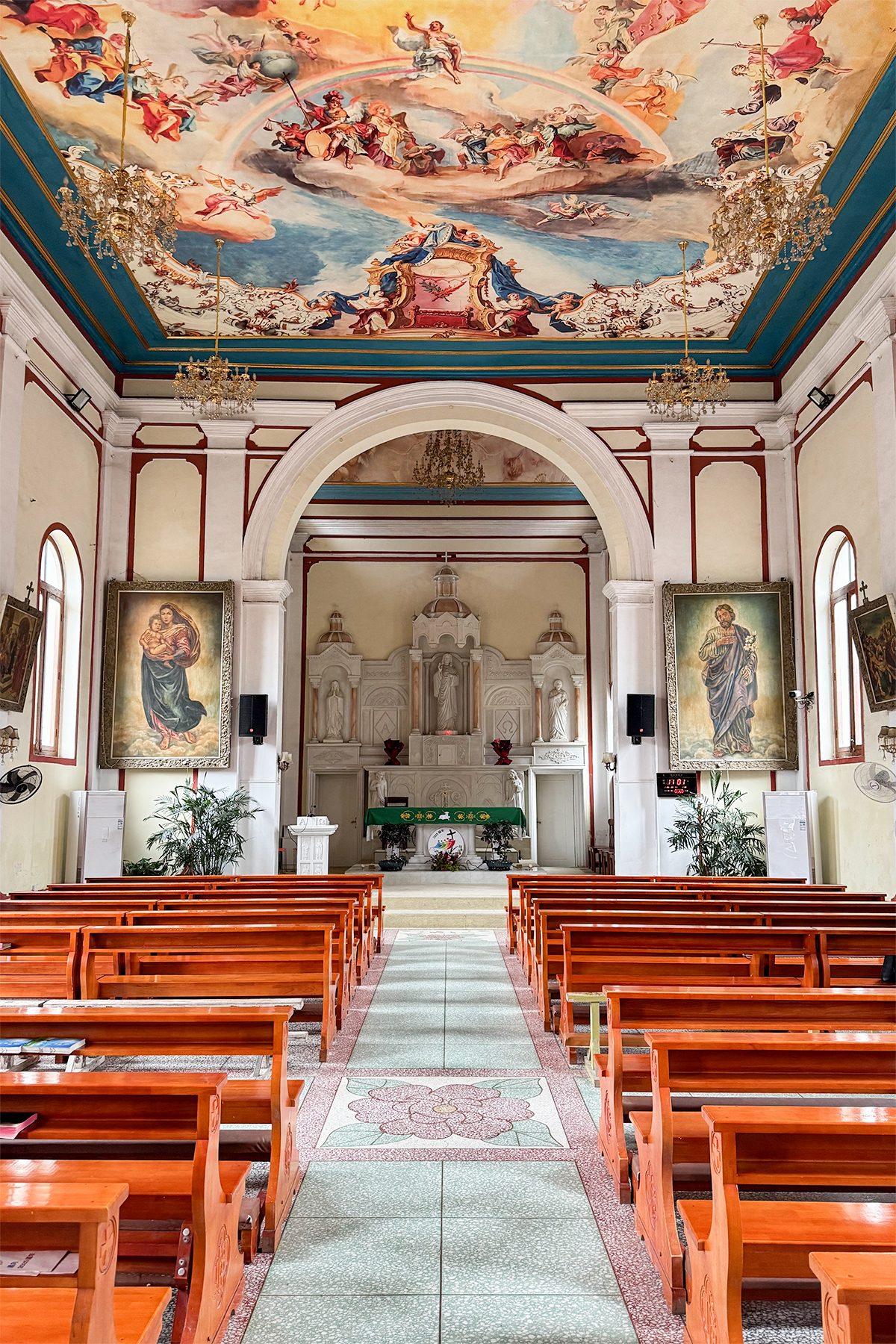
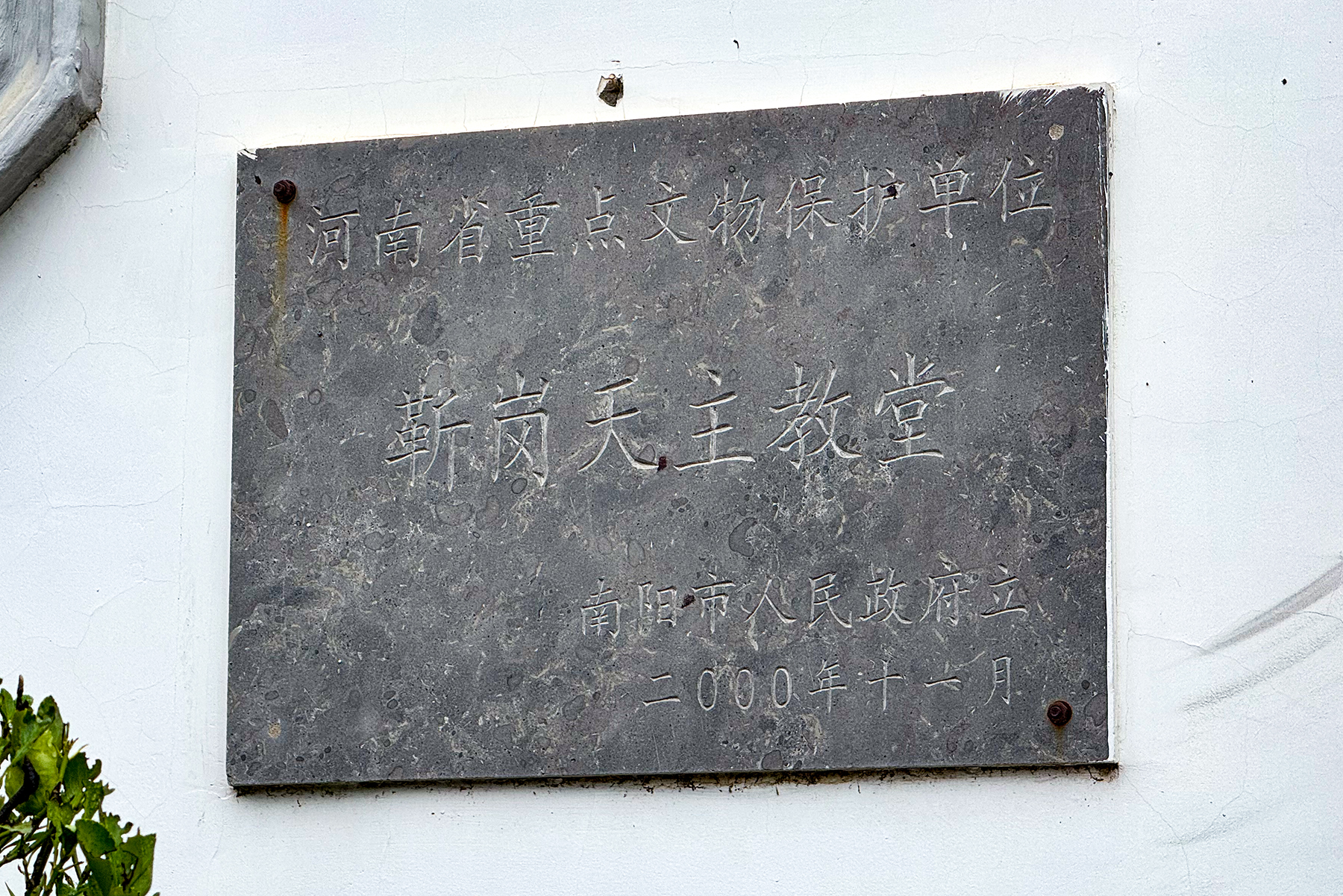
- Jingang, Liuyang, China

- Location in Hunan
- Coordinates: 27°54′54″N 113°41′03″E
- Country: People's Republic of China
- Province: Hunan
- Prefecture-level city: Changsha
- County-level city: Liuyang

Area
  - Total: 79.88 km^{2} (30.84 sq mi)

Population (2015)
  - Total: 64,000
  - Density: 800/km^{2} (2,100/sq mi)
- Time zone: UTC+8 (China Standard)
- Postal code: 410313
- Area code: 0731

Jingang Town (simplified Chinese: 金刚镇; traditional Chinese: 金剛鎮; pinyin: Jīngāng Zhèn) is a rural town in Liuyang City, Hunan Province, People's Republic of China. As of the 2015 census it had a population of 64,000 and an area of 79.88 square kilometres (30.84 sq mi). The town is bordered to the north and west by Dayao Town, to the east by Jinshan Town of Shangli County, to the south by Litian Town of Liling, and to the northeast by Chengtanjiang Town.

== Administrative divisions ==
The town is divided into seven villages and three communities, which include the following areas:

- Jinshi Community (金市社区)
- Jinsheng Community (金声社区)
- Limei Community (李畋社区)
- Shanhu Village (山虎村)
- Shaluo Village (沙螺村)
- Dangui Village (丹桂村)
- Shiguang Village (石霜村)
- Taizihu Village (太子湖村)
- Xingxing Village (星星村)
- Nanyue Village (南岳村)

== Geography ==
The Nanchuan River (南川河) flows north to south through the town.

There are two reservoirs in the town: Taizihu Reservoir (太子湖水库; 'Prince Lake Reservoir') and Duzhuang Reservoir (杜庄水库).

Mount Tingziling (亭子岭; 'Pavilion Ridge') is the peak-point in the town; its peak elevation is 796.2 metres (2,612 ft).

== Economy ==
Jingang Town's economy is based on fireworks and agricultural resources.

== Education ==
- Jingang Middle School

== Transportation ==
=== National Highway ===
The National Highway 106 runs north to south through the town.

=== Expressway ===
The Changsha–Liuyang Expressway, from Changsha, running northwest to southeast through the town to Jiangxi.

=== County road ===
County Road X008 passes across the town east to west.

== Religion ==
Shishuang Temple (石霜寺) is a Buddhist temple in the town.

Nanyue Shengdi Temple (南岳圣地庙) is a Taoist temple in the town.

== Attractions ==
The main attractions are the Grand House of Liu Family (刘家大屋) and the Grand House of Li Family (李家大屋).

Yunyan Cave (云岩洞) is a famous scenic spot.
