= Bell tower (Chinese Buddhism) =

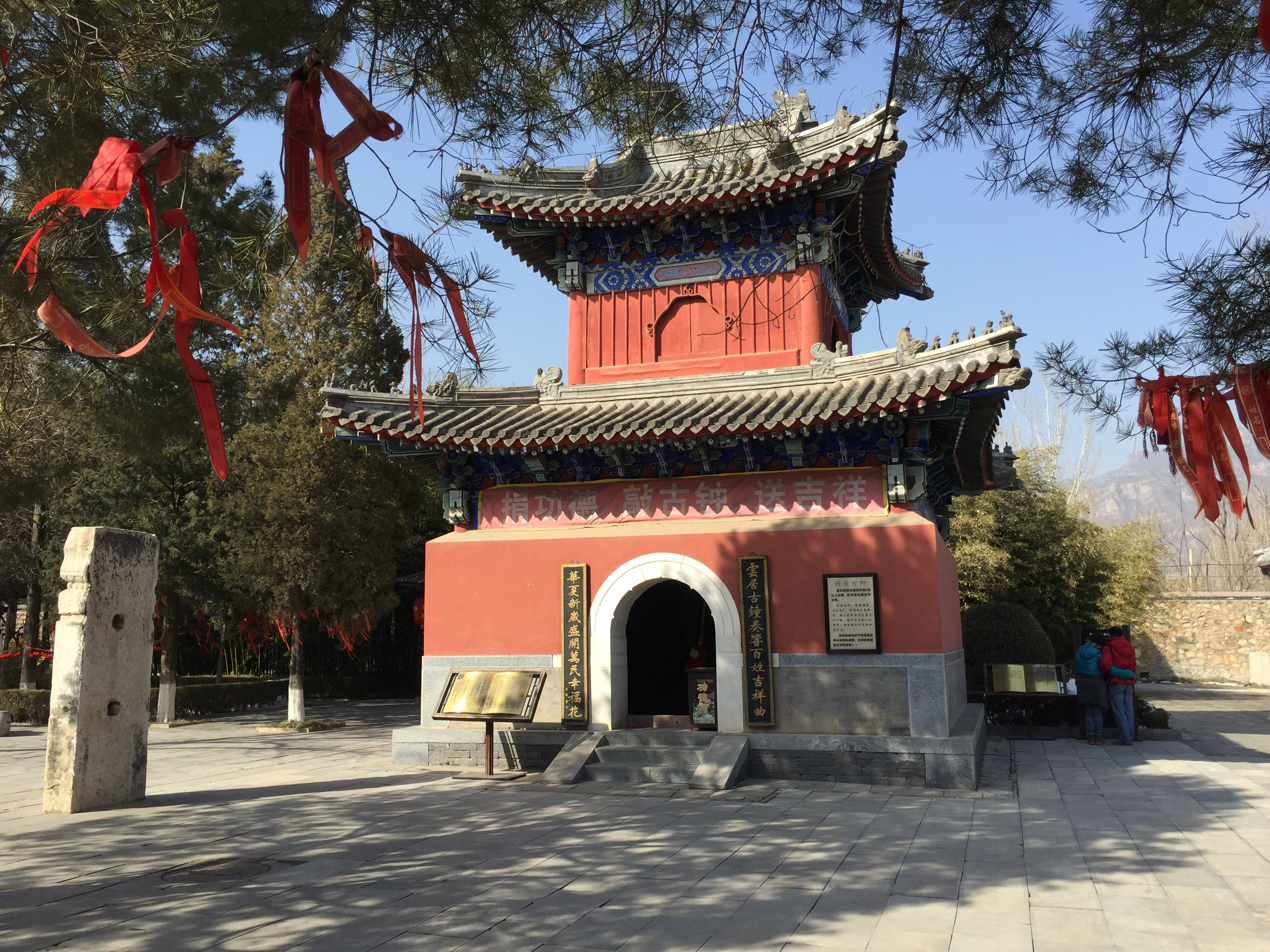
- The Bell tower at Yunju Temple, in Beijing.
- Traditional Chinese: 鐘樓
- Simplified Chinese: 钟楼
- Literal meaning: Bell tower
Transcriptions
Standard Mandarin
- Hanyu Pinyin: Zhōnglóu

The bell tower is an important building in Han Chinese Buddhist temples. Together with the drum tower, they are usually placed on both sides of the Hall of Four Heavenly Kings. It is usually on the left side while the drum tower is on the right side. Generally, bell towers are three-storey pavilions with a large bell hung inside. The loud and melodious sound of the bell is often used to convene monks. Sounding the bell 108 times every morning and night symbolizes relief of the 108 kinds of trouble in the human world.

== Examples ==
=== Bell tower of Xiantong Temple ===
The Bell tower of Xiantong Temple was built in the Ming dynasty (1368–1644). A biggest copper bell is stored in the tower. It was cast between 1621 and 1627 during the Ming dynasty (1368–1644). Weighing 4,999.75 kilograms (11,022.6 lb), it sounds deep and sonorous when beaten, which can pass away for 5-kilometre (3.1 mi) and last for several minutes.
