= Mahavira Hall =

Main hall of Chinese, Korean, Vietnamese and Japanese Ōbaku Zen Buddhist temples

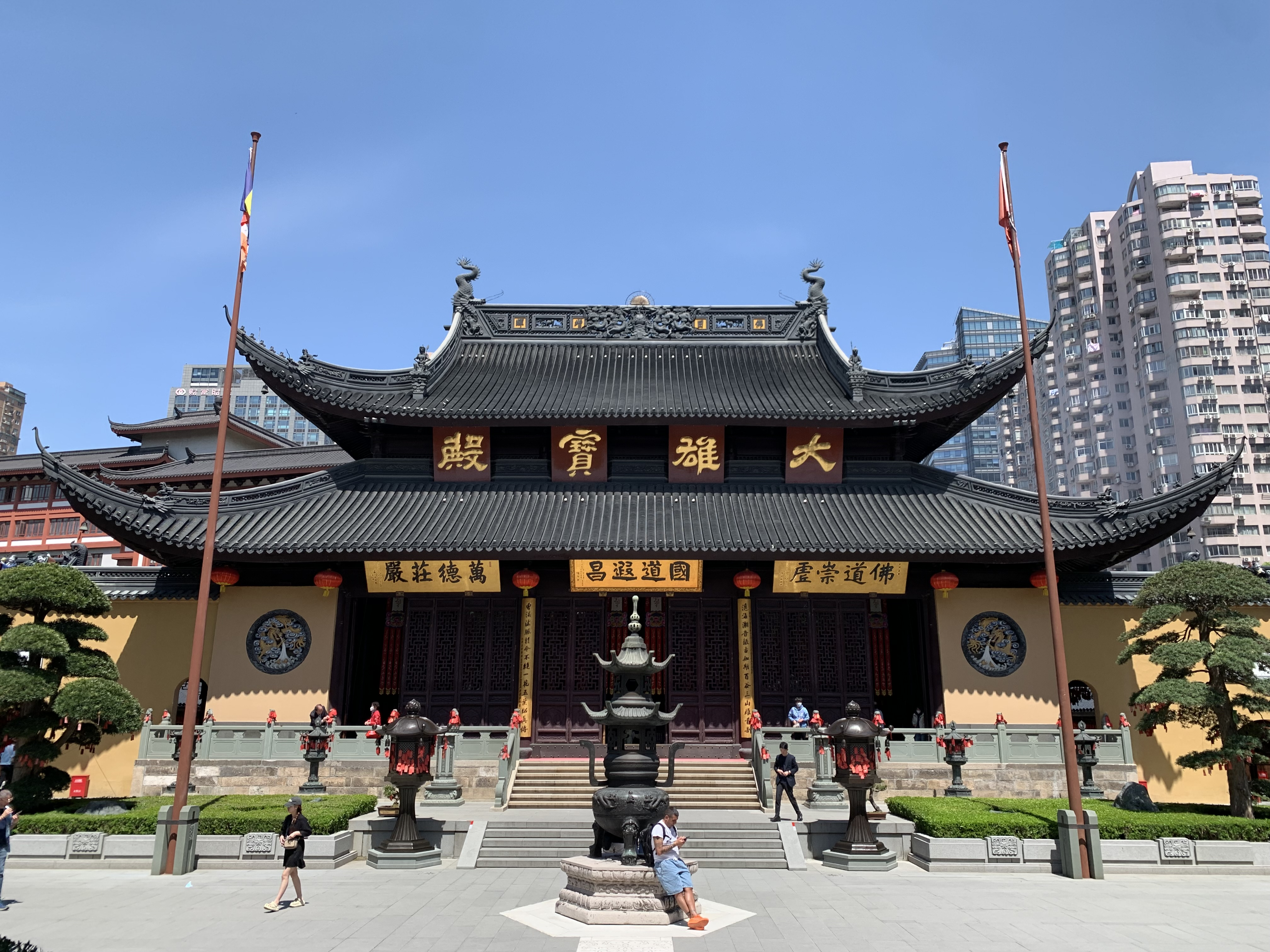
- Mahavira Hall of Jade Buddha Temple, Shanghai

Chinese name
- Traditional Chinese: 大雄寶殿
- Simplified Chinese: 大雄宝殿
- Literal meaning: Precious Hall of the Great Hero
Transcriptions
Standard Mandarin
- Hanyu Pinyin: Dàxióng Bǎodiàn
- Wade–Giles: Ta-hsiung Pao-tien
Southern Min
- Hokkien POJ: Tōa-hiông Pó-tiān

Vietnamese name
- Vietnamese alphabet: Đại hùng Bửu điện (Đại hùng Bảo điện); Chính điện (Chánh điện)
- Chữ Hán: 大雄寶殿 正殿

Korean name
- Hangul: 대웅전
- Hanja: 大雄殿
Transcriptions
- Revised Romanization: Daeungjeon

Japanese name
- Kanji: 大雄宝殿
Transcriptions
- Romanization: Daiyū Hōden

A Mahavira Hall, also known simply as a Main Hall, is the main building in a traditional East Asian Buddhist temple, enshrining representations of Gautama Buddha and various other buddhas and bodhisattvas. For temples enshrining Gautama Buddha, they are usually termed the Daxiong Baodian or Daxiongbao Hall in Chinese Buddhism. In Japanese Ōbaku Zen Buddhist temples, they are usually termed the Daiyū Hōden. In Korean Buddhist temples, they are usually termed the Daeungjeon or Daeungbojeon. In Vietnamese Buddhist temples, they are usually termed the Đại Hùng Bửu Điện.

== Names ==
From their importance and use, they are often simply known in English as the temples' "Main" or "Great Halls". The term "Mahavira Hall", also encountered as "Mahāvīra Hall" or "Hall of the Mahāvīra", is a reverse translation, employing the original Sanskrit term in place of its Chinese or English equivalent. They are also known as the Precious Hall of the Great Hero, the Hall of Great Strength, or the Daxiongbao Hall. Less often, a main hall is called an "adytum", after the equivalent area in Greco-Roman temples. It is also sometimes misunderstood as the "Great, Powerful, and Precious Palace".

== China ==
The Mahavira Hall is typically the main hall of most Chinese Buddhist temple. In most temples, the Mahavira Hall is generally located in the north of the Heavenly King Hall and serves as the core architecture of the whole temple and also a place for monks to practice. During the historical development of Chinese Buddhist architecture, temples were originally generally arranged in a courtyard style, with the main hall or pagoda at the center, surrounded by corridors. This was predominantly seen in temples established during the Northern and Southern dynasties (420–589), the Sui dynasty (581–618) and the Tang dynasty (618–907). By the Song dynasty (960–1279), Chinese Buddhist temples began to adopt a longitudinal axis layout, with the main halls arranged along a central axis, and side halls on the left and right in front of each hall, forming a three- or four-sided layout. The Mahavira Hall replaced the pagoda as the central element of the temple architecture, and pagodas were mostly built in the rear courtyard or on either side of the main hall.

Many Mahavira Halls enshrine Śākyamuni, the founder of Buddhism, together along with other Buddhas and Buddhist figures. Śākyamuni statues enshrined in the Mahavira Hall have three modeling postures. The first is sitting in the lotus posture with the left hand placing on the left foot and the right hand dropping naturally, representing that he has sacrificed all he has for people before he becomes Buddha. All these can only be proved by the ground. This posture of the statues is called "posture of becoming Buddha" (成道相). The second is sitting in the lotus posture with the left hand placing on the left foot and the right hand's finger ringing. This is called "posture of preaching" (說法相), showing his postures when preaching. The third is a standing Buddha with the left hand dropping, signifying the hope that all people can fulfill their wishes, and the right hand stretching arm, indicating all people can relieve their sufferings. This posture is called "Sandalwood Buddha" (旃檀佛相). Usually two disciples' statues are placed next to the statue of Śākyamuni, the older is called "Mahakassapa" and the middle-aged is called "Ānanda".

Three statues of Bodhisattva facing the north are also usually enshrined behind the central statues . They are Mañjuśrī Bodhisattva riding a lion, Samantabhadra Bodhisattva riding a white elephant and Guanyin Bodhisattva riding a dragon. Some temples also set island scene behind Śākyamuni's statue and only enshrine the statue Guanyin Bodhisattva with a clean vase of water and a willow branch in it.

Other popular groupings of Buddhist figures are also frequently enshrined as the central images on the main altar in the Mahavira Hall. One example is the Five Tathāgatas (五方佛), an esoteric grouping consisting of the heads of the Five Buddha Families: Mahāvairocana, Amitābha, Amoghasiddhi, Ratnasambhava and Akshobhya. Another example is the Three Noble Ones of Huayan (華嚴三聖), consisting of Vairocana or Śākyamuni, Mañjuśrī and Samantabhadra. Another example is the Three Noble Ones of the Sahā World (娑婆三聖), consisting of Śākyamuni, Guanyin and Ksitigarbha. Another example is the Buddhas of the Three Realms (三世佛), consisting of Śākyamuni in the center, Amitābha in the west and Bhaisajyaguru or Akshobhya in the east. In addition, other revered figures such as Sariputra, Maudgalyayana, the Eighteen Arhats or the Twenty-Four Protective Deities may also be enshrined on the left and right walls of the hall flanking the central statues.

== Japan ==
Mahavira Halls in Japan emerged through cultural exchange, notably with the founding of Manpuku-ji in Uji, Kyoto in 1661 by the Chinese monk Yinyuan Longqi (Ingen Ryūki), who founded the Ōbaku Zen tradition of Japanese Buddhism. Designed in the Ming dynasty style, Manpuku-ji's Mahavira Hall is built with keyaki (zelkova) wood, featuring symmetrical layouts and peach-shaped carvings to ward off evil, and was designated a National Treasure in 2024. Most Ōbaku Zen-affiliated temples that were later built after the founding of Manpuku-ji also feature similar architectural stylings, including the Mahavira Hall. Like in many Chinese temples, the Mahavira Hall in many Ōbaku Zen temples also typically enshrine Śākyamuni as the central image, which reflects the heavy influence of Ming dynasty Chinese Buddhist culture on Ōbaku Zen practices.

== Korea ==
In Korea, beopdang refers to buildings that enshrine Buddha and Bodhisattva. The name of beopdang differs on the type of deity enshrined.

Daeungjeon (대웅전; 大雄殿) refers to buildings that enshrine Sakyamuni. It is also called daeungbojeon (대웅보전) to show respect. It is located at the center of the temple and often also houses Manjushri and Samantabhadra. The altar in the center of the building is called sumidan (수미단; 須彌壇) and datjip (닫집, structure made like the eaves of a wooden building) is placed over the main statue. Various Buddhist paintings are placed behind Sakyamuni. A notable example is daeungjeon of Sudeoksa which is designated as national treasure.

== Vietnam ==
Vietnamese Mahavira Halls blend local and foreign influences, seen in temples like Bích Động in Ninh Binh Province (later Lê dynasty, 1428–1789) and Tây An in An Giang Province (1847). Bích Động's Mahavira Hall, a five-bay, double-eaved structure, nestles into limestone cliffs, while Tây An's two-story hall combines Vietnamese carvings with Indian-inspired domes. Both enshrine Śākyamuni Buddha statues, often intricately carved from wood. These sites, recognized as national cultural relics, highlight Vietnam's adaptive temple architecture.

== Examples ==
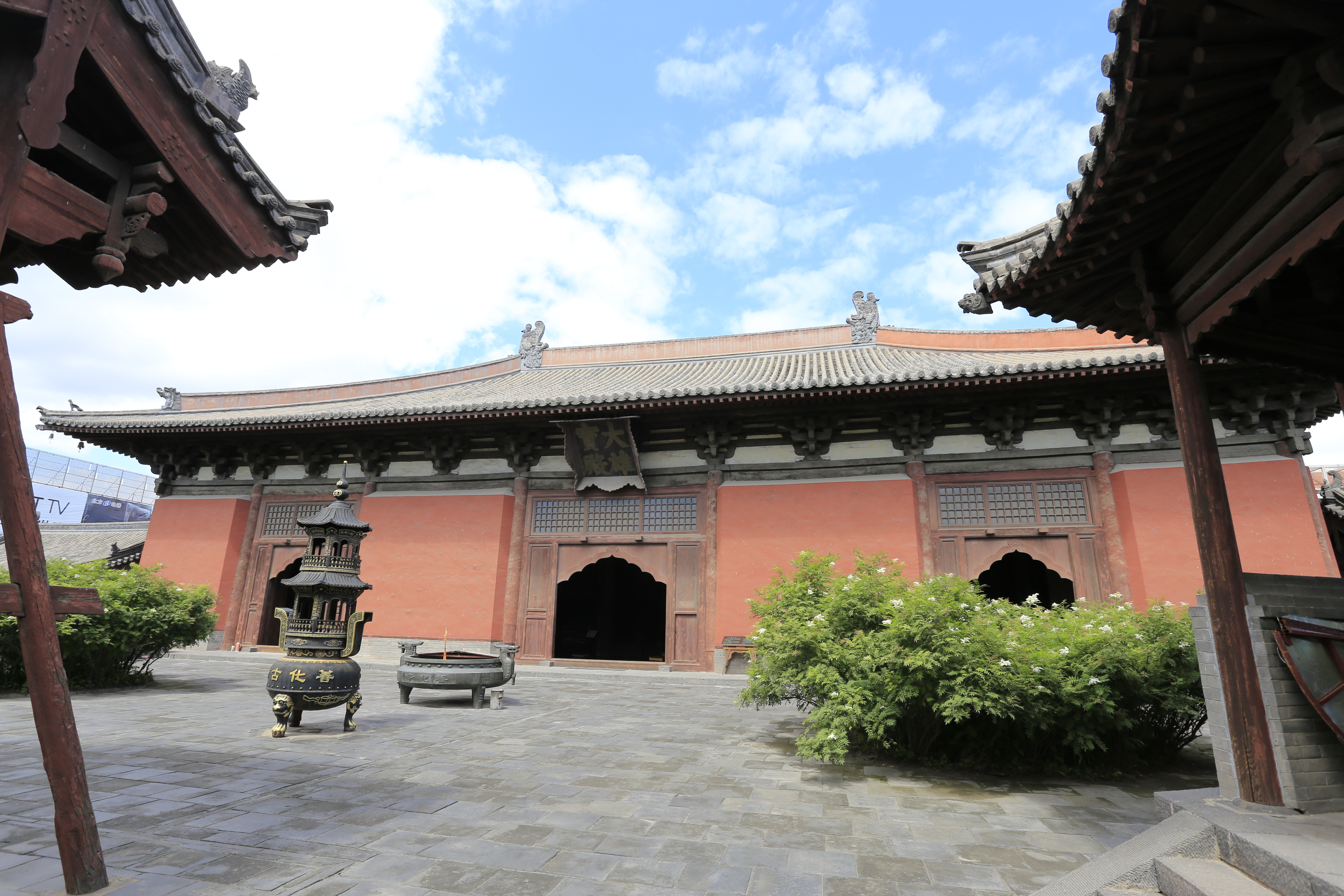
Liao dynasty (916–1125) Daxiong Baodian of Shanhua Temple in Datong, Shanxi, China. Built in the 11th century.

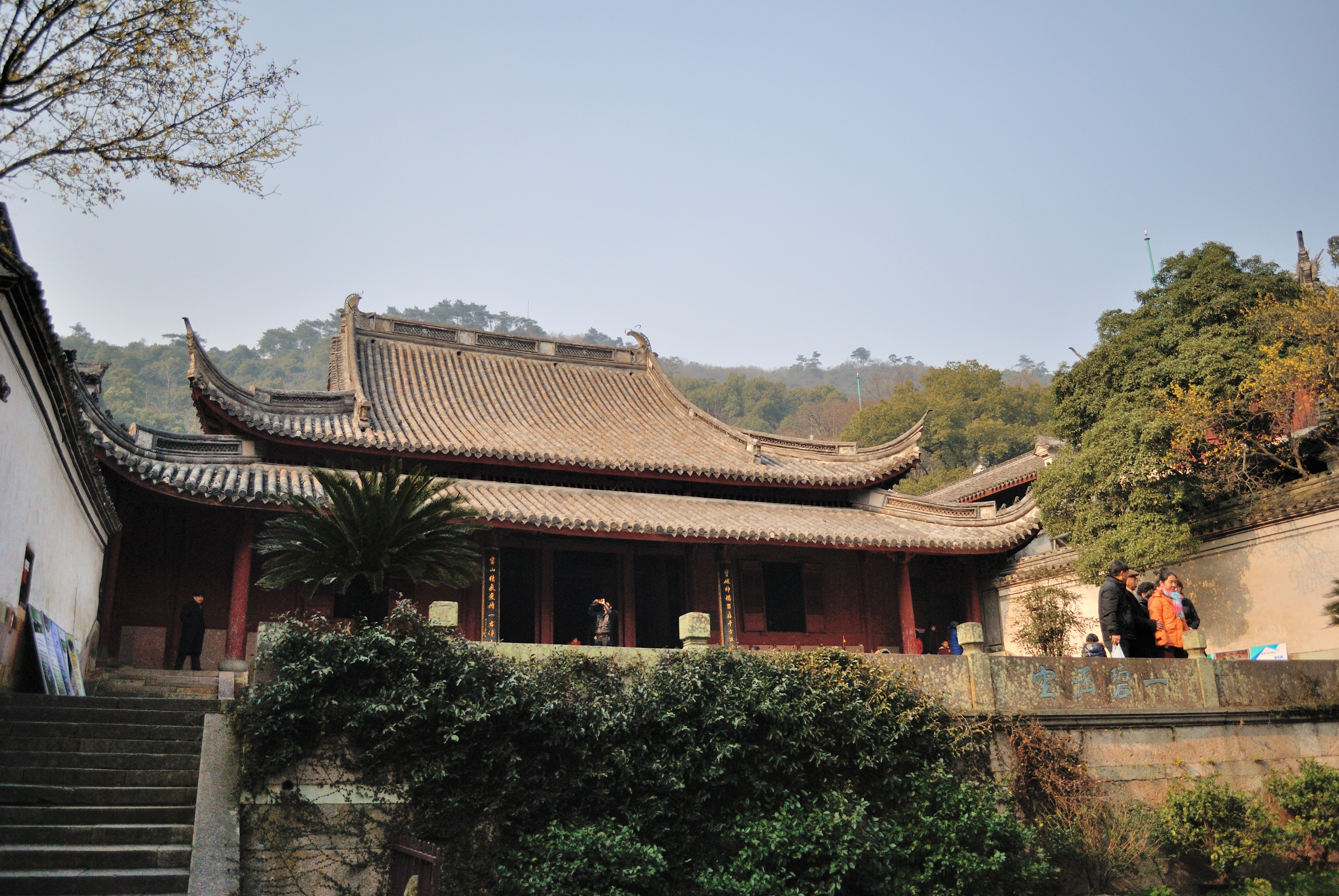
Song dynasty (960–1279) Daxiong Baodian of Baoguo Temple in Ningbo, Zhejiang, China. Built in 1013.

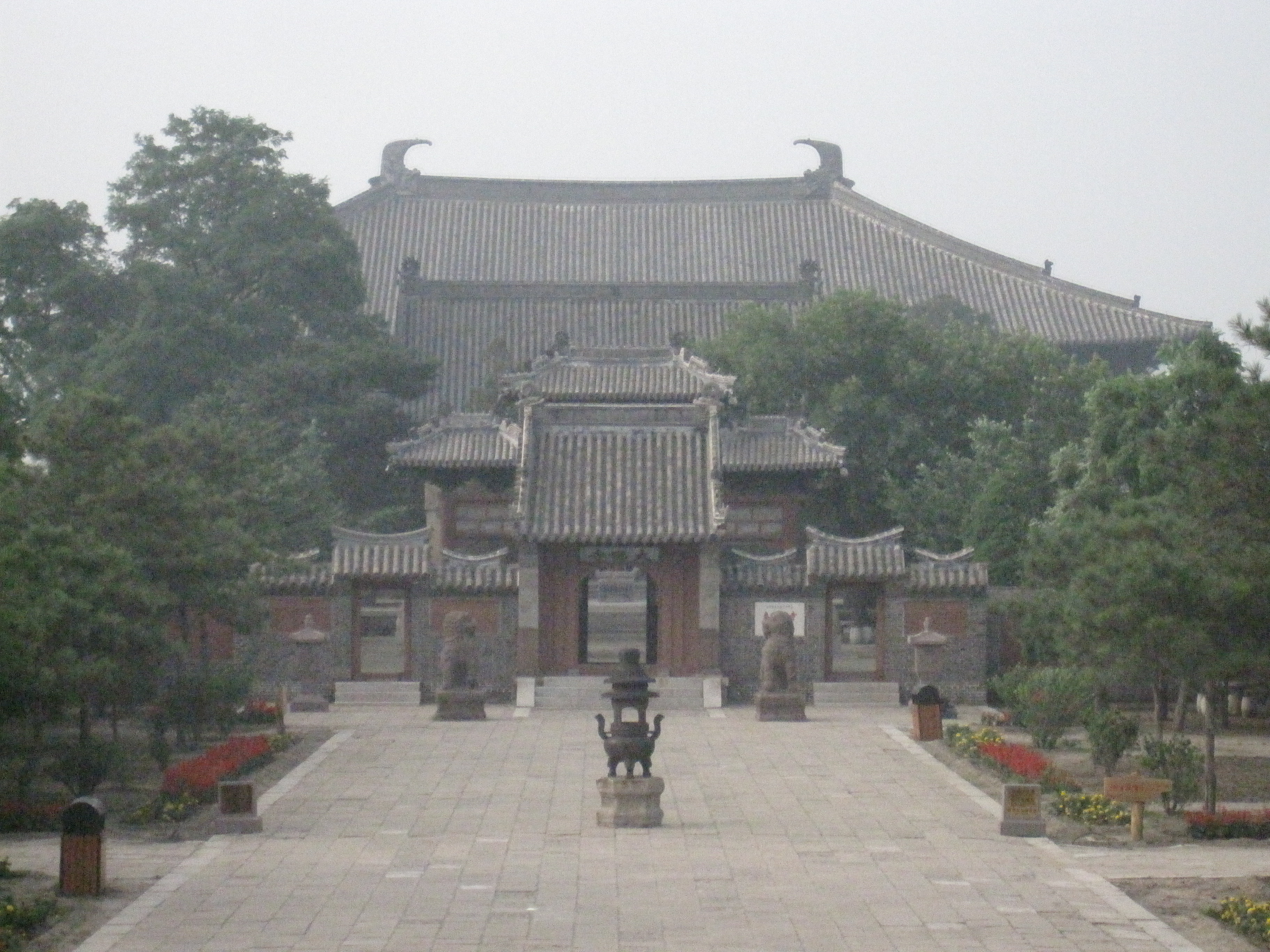
Liao dynasty (916–1125) Daxiong Baodian of Fengguo Temple in Yixian, Liaoning, China. Built in 1020.

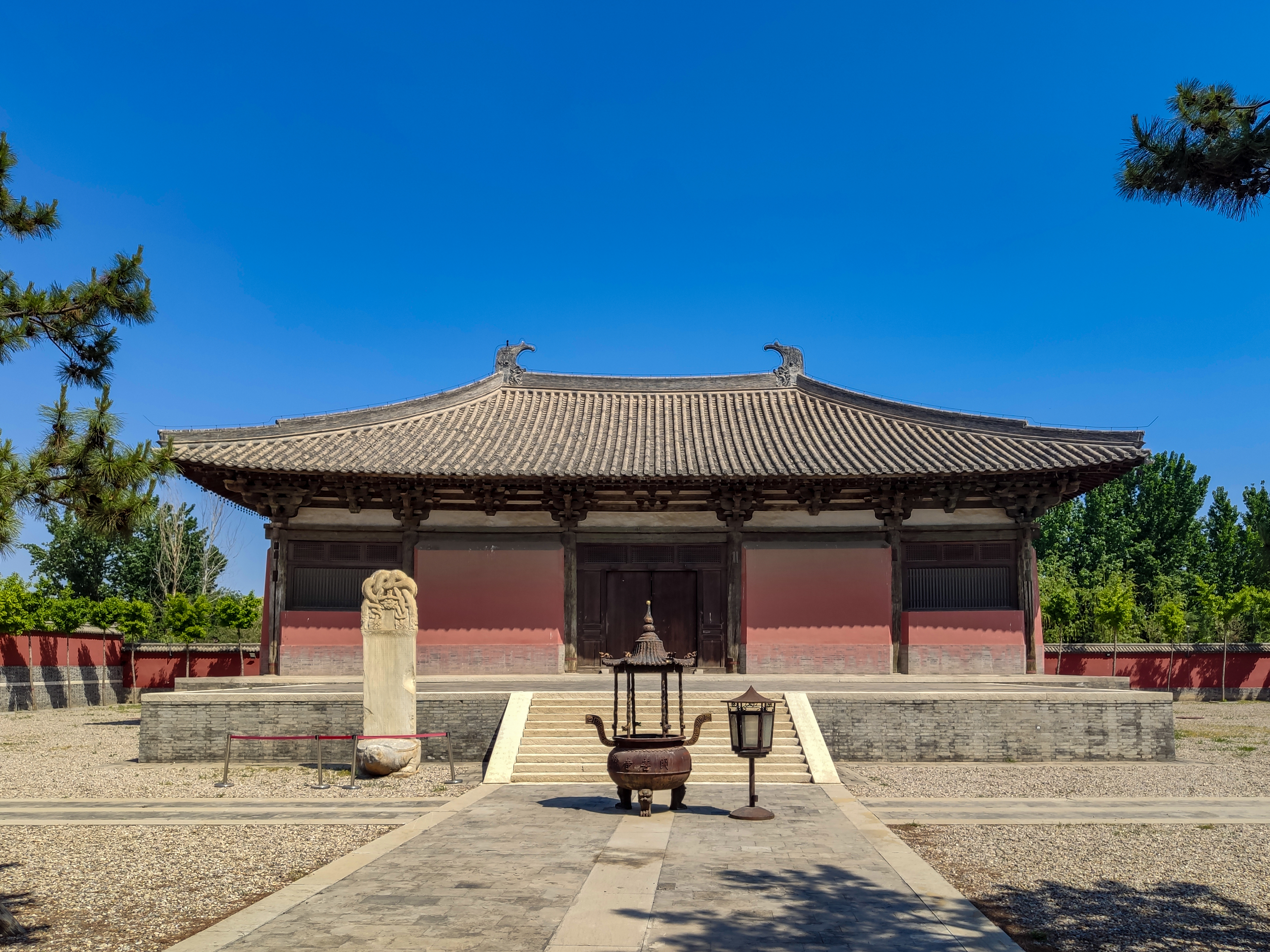
Liao dynasty (916–1125) Daxiong Baodian of Kaishan Temple in Gaobeidian, Hebei, China. Built in 1033 .

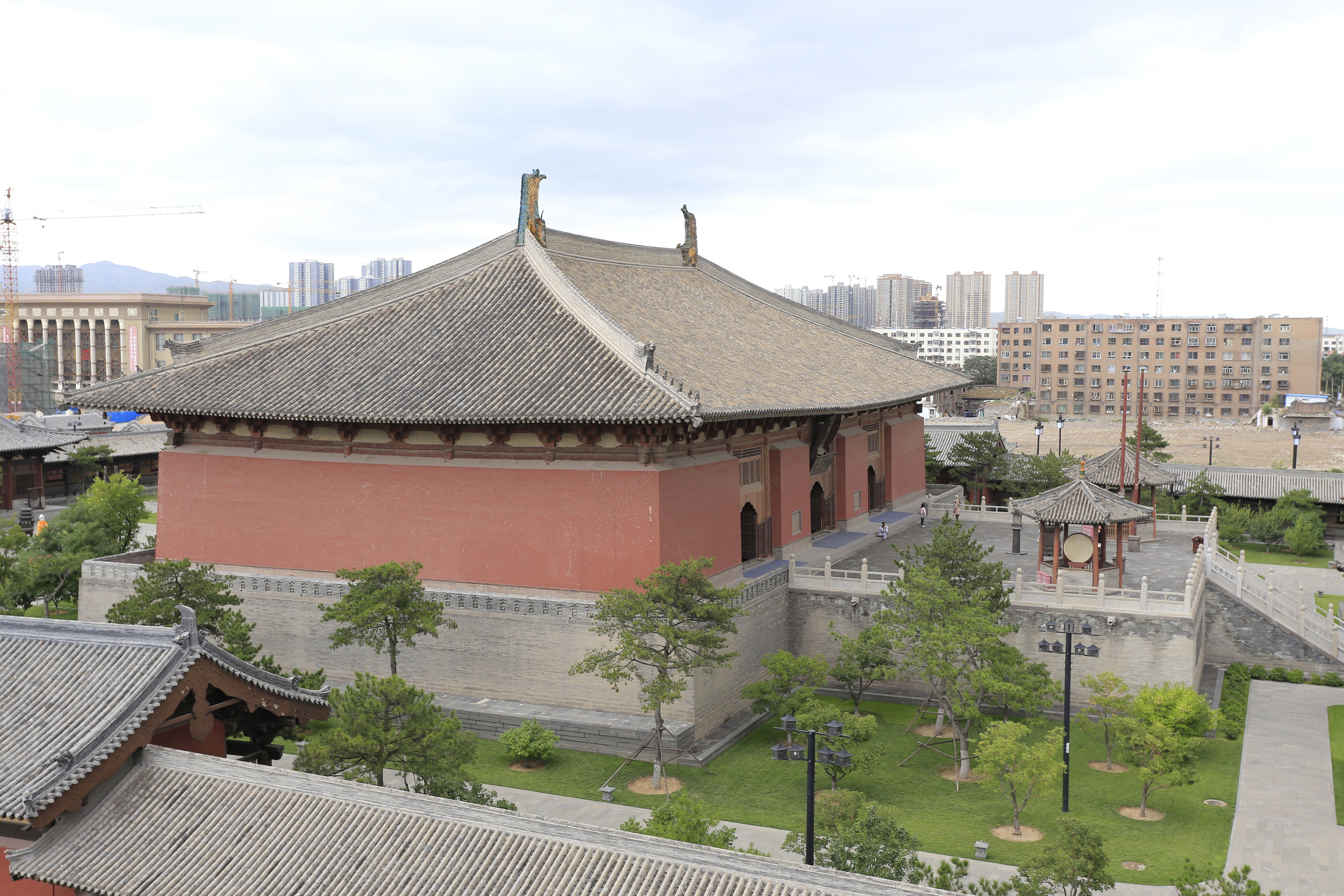
Jin dynasty (1115–1234) Daxiong Baodian of Huayan Temple in Datong, Shanxi, China. Built in 1140.

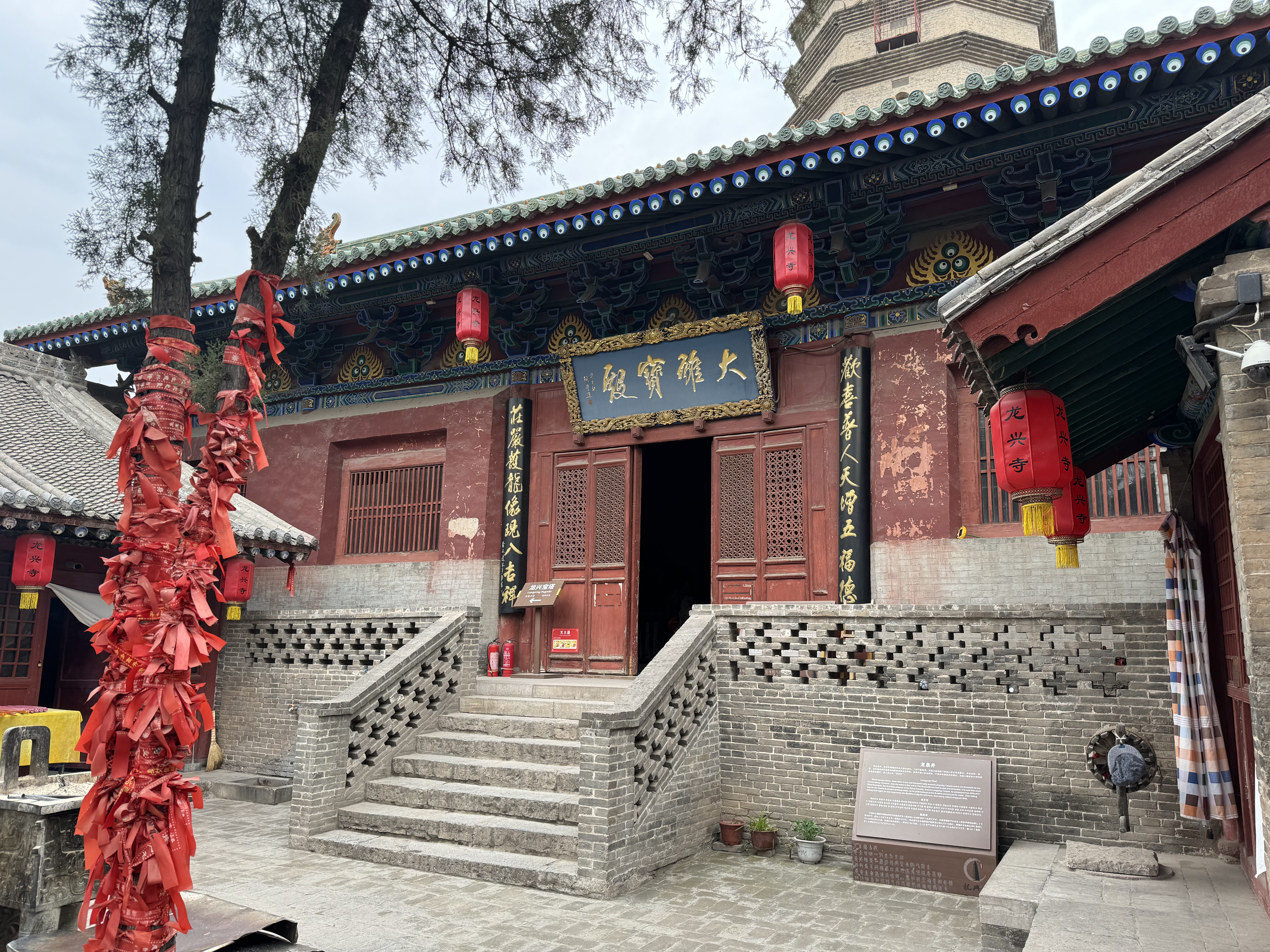
Yuan dynasty (1271–1368) Daxiong Baodian of Longxing Temple in Yuncheng, Shanxi, China.

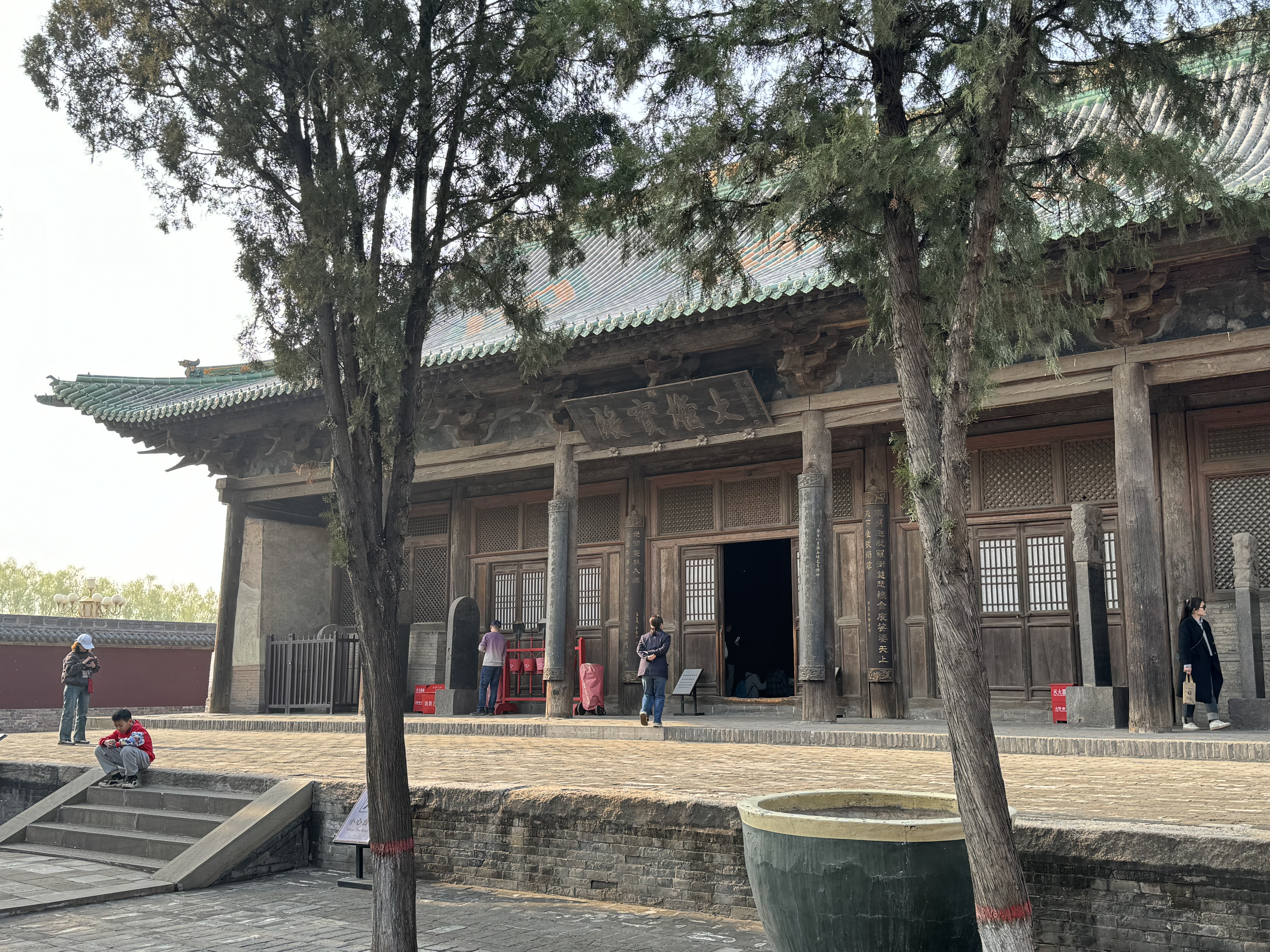
Early Ming dynasty (1368–1644) Daxiong Baodian of Shuanglin Temple in Pingyao, Shanxi, China.

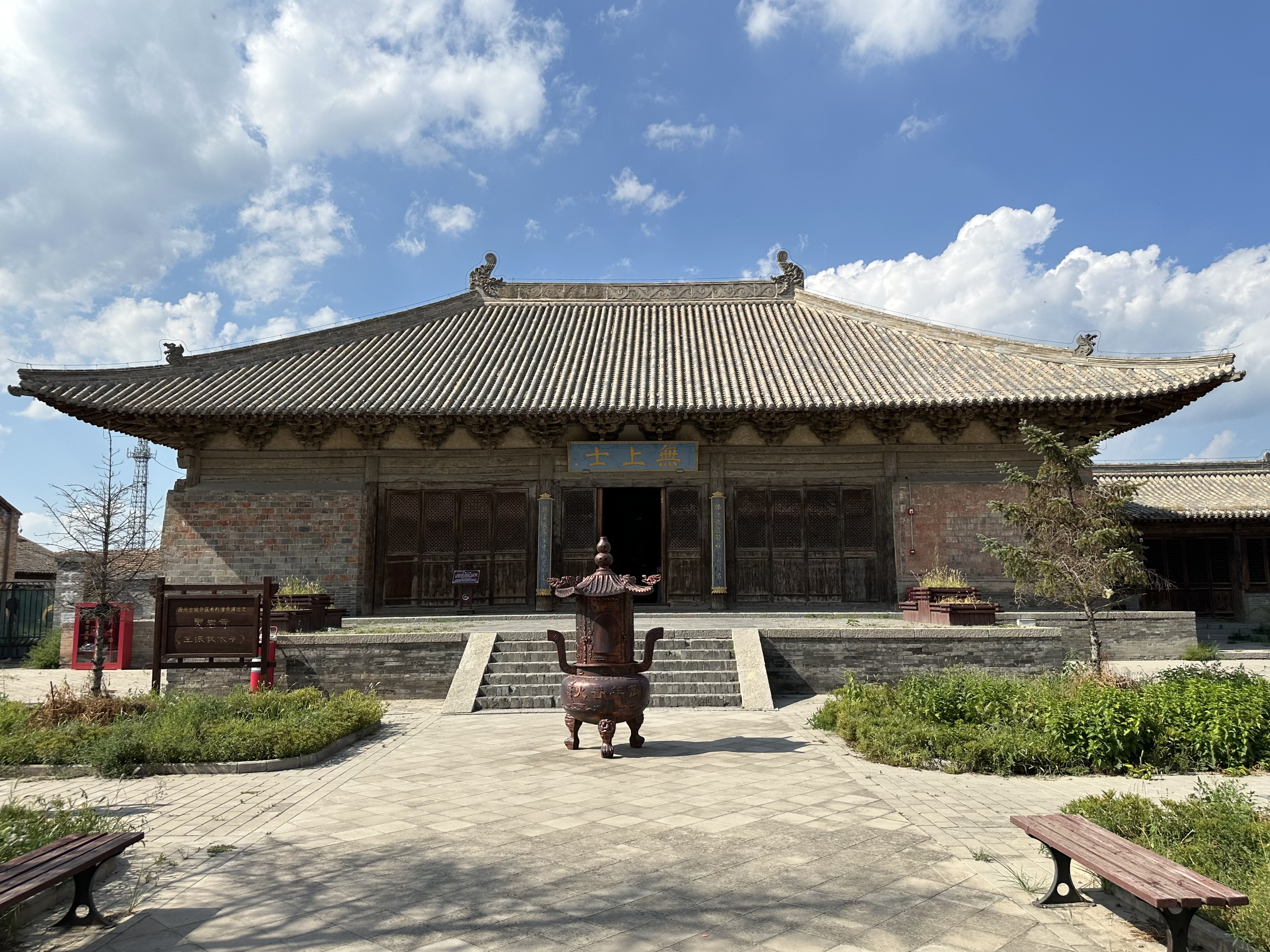
Ming dynasty (1368–1644) Daxiong Baodian of Lingyan Temple in Zhangjiakou, Hebei, China. Built in 1441.

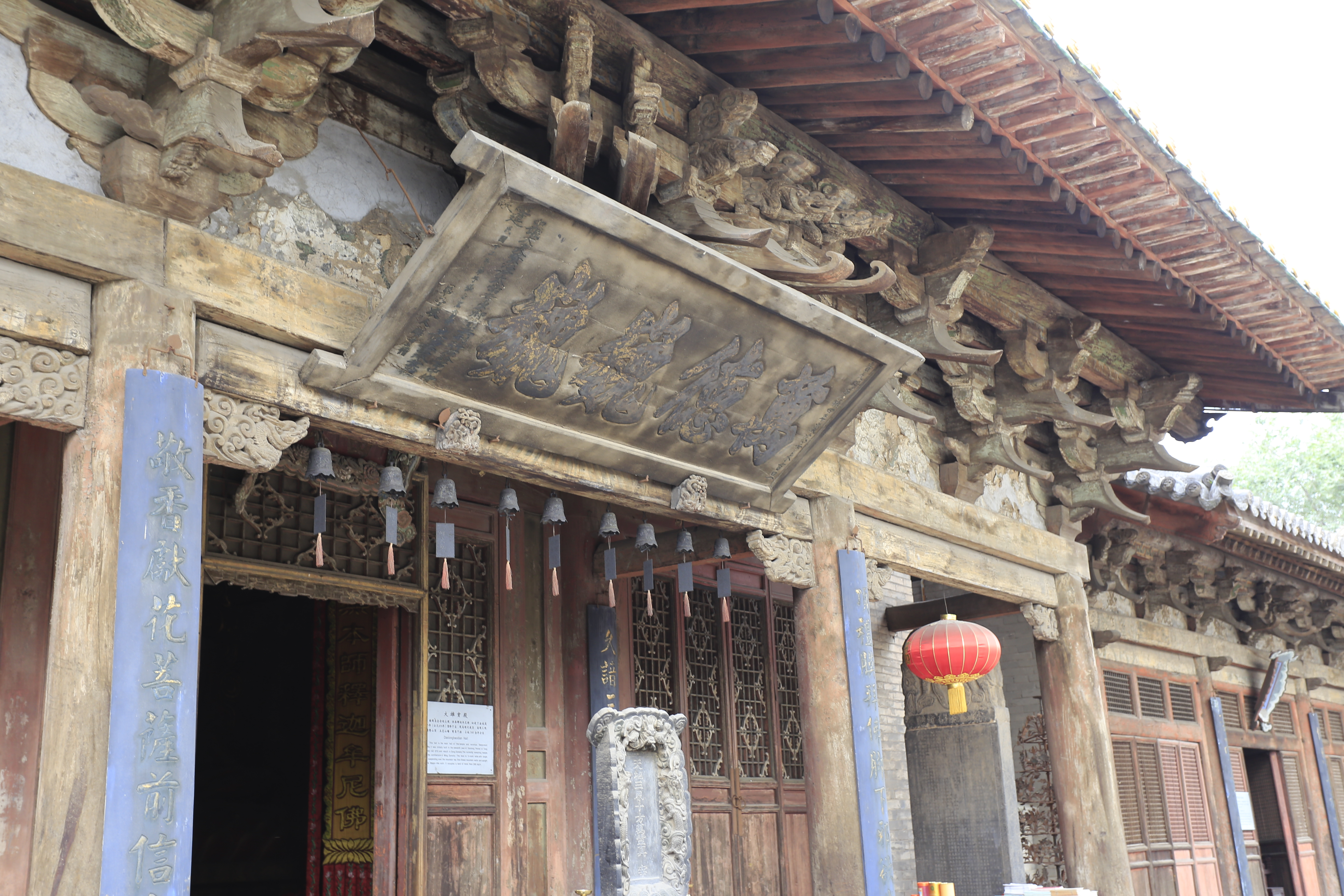
Ming dynasty (1368–1644) Daxiong Baodian of Zishou Temple in Lingshi, Shanxi, China. Built in 1521.

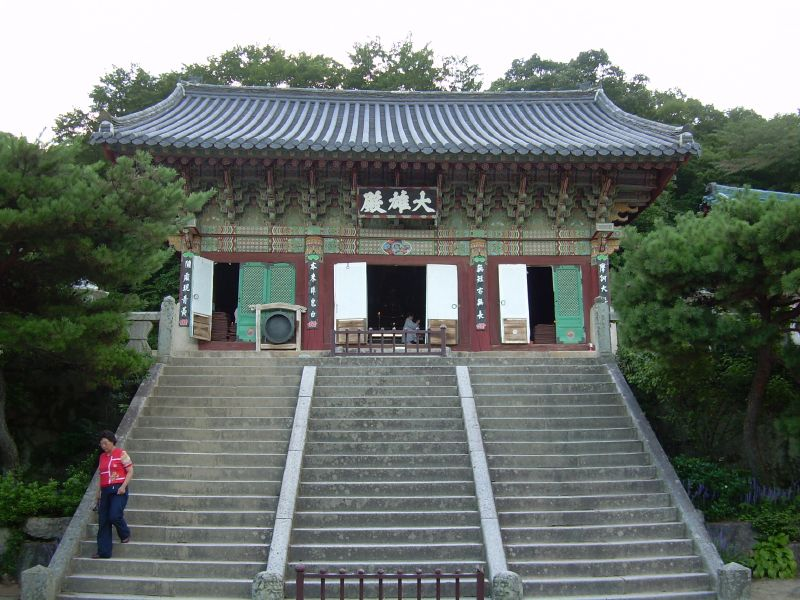
Joseon dynasty (1392–1897) Daeungjeon of Beomeosa in Busan, South Korea. Built in 1614.

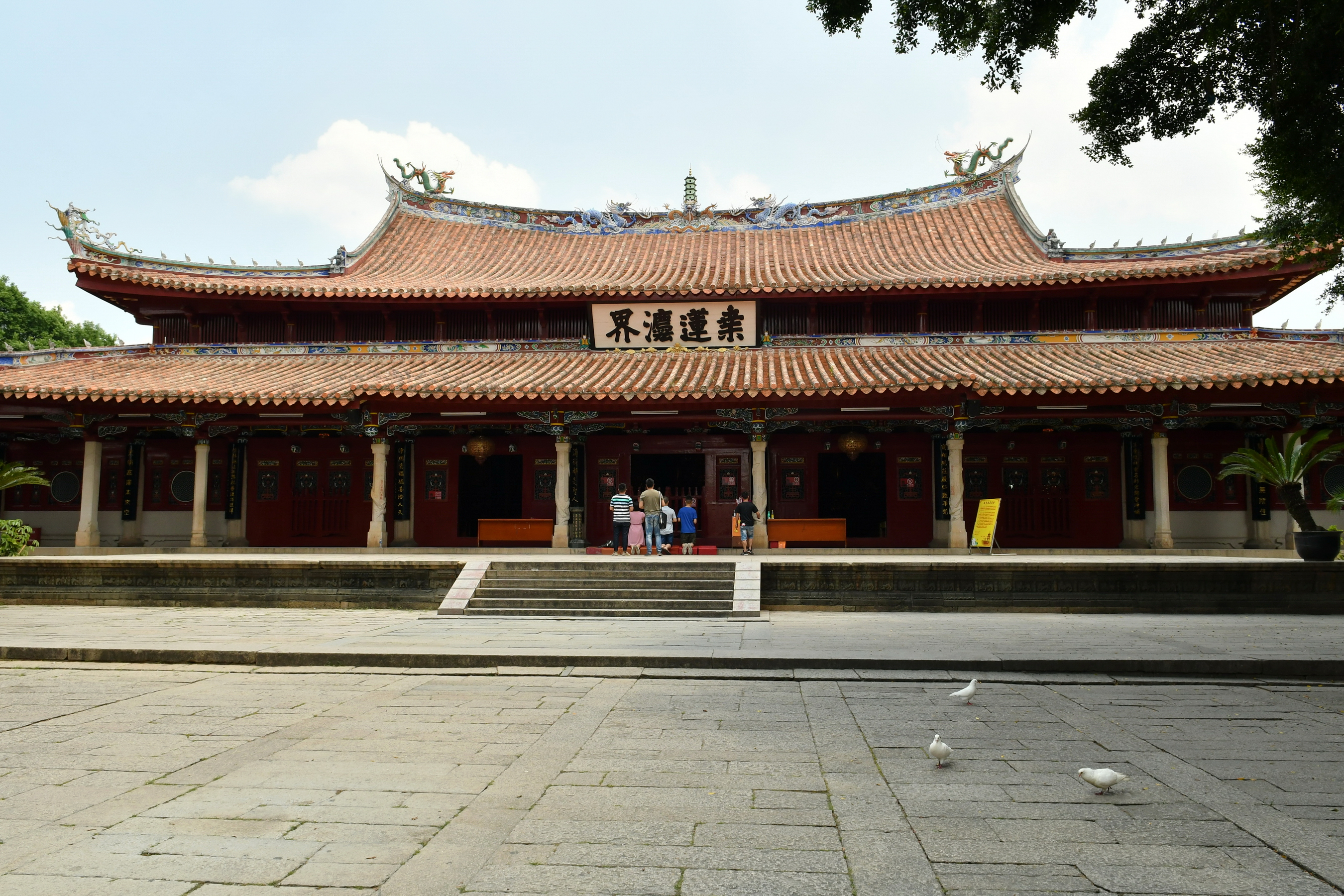
Late Ming dynasty (1368–1644) Daxiong Baodian of Kaiyuan Temple in Quanzhou, Fujian, China. Built in 1637.

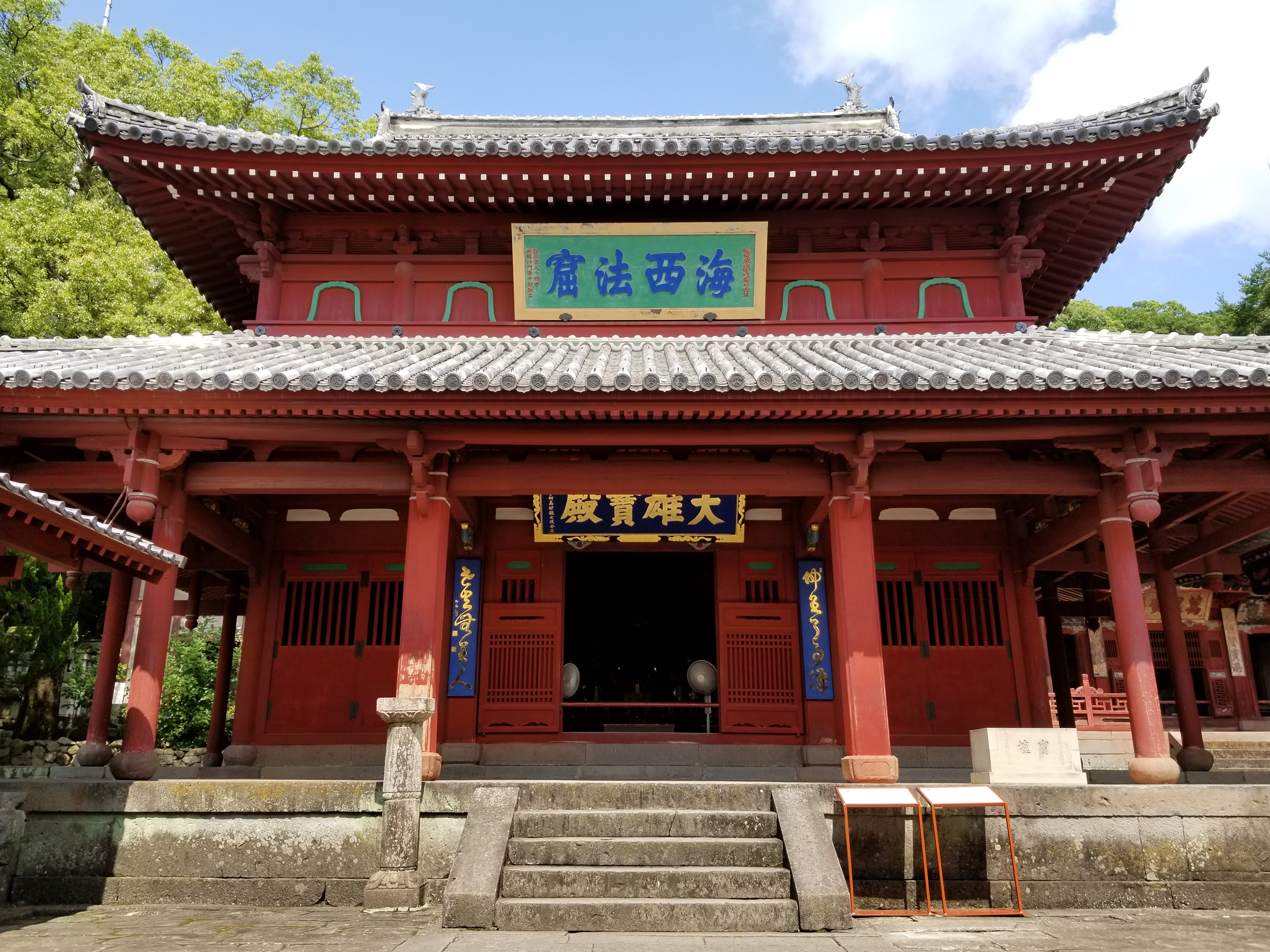
Early Edo period (1600–1868) Daiyū Hōden of Sōfuku-ji in Nagasaki, Nagasaki, Japan. Built in 1646.

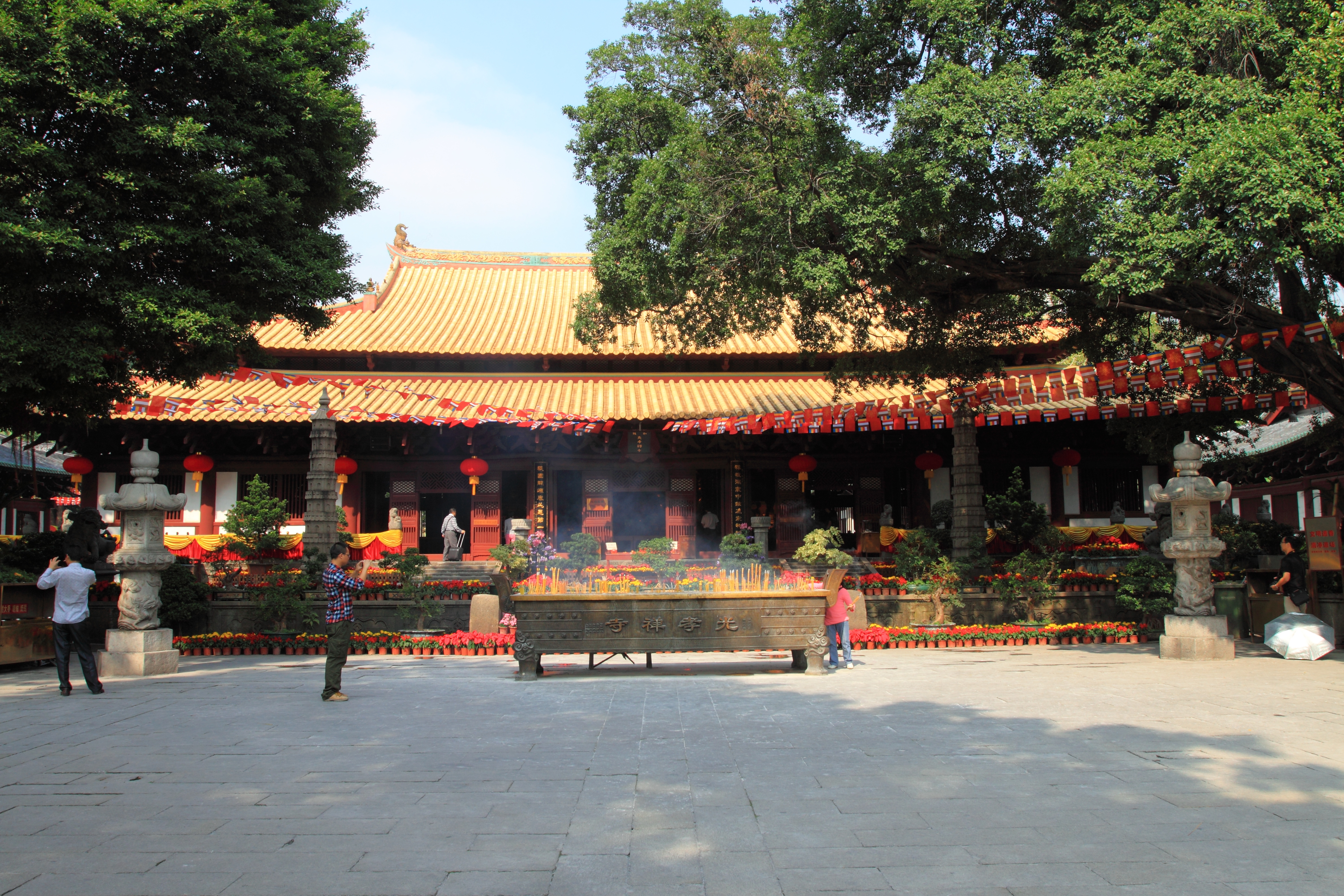
Early Qing dynasty (1644–1912) Daxiong Baodian of Guangxiao Temple in Guangzhou, Guangdong, China. Rebuilt in 1654.

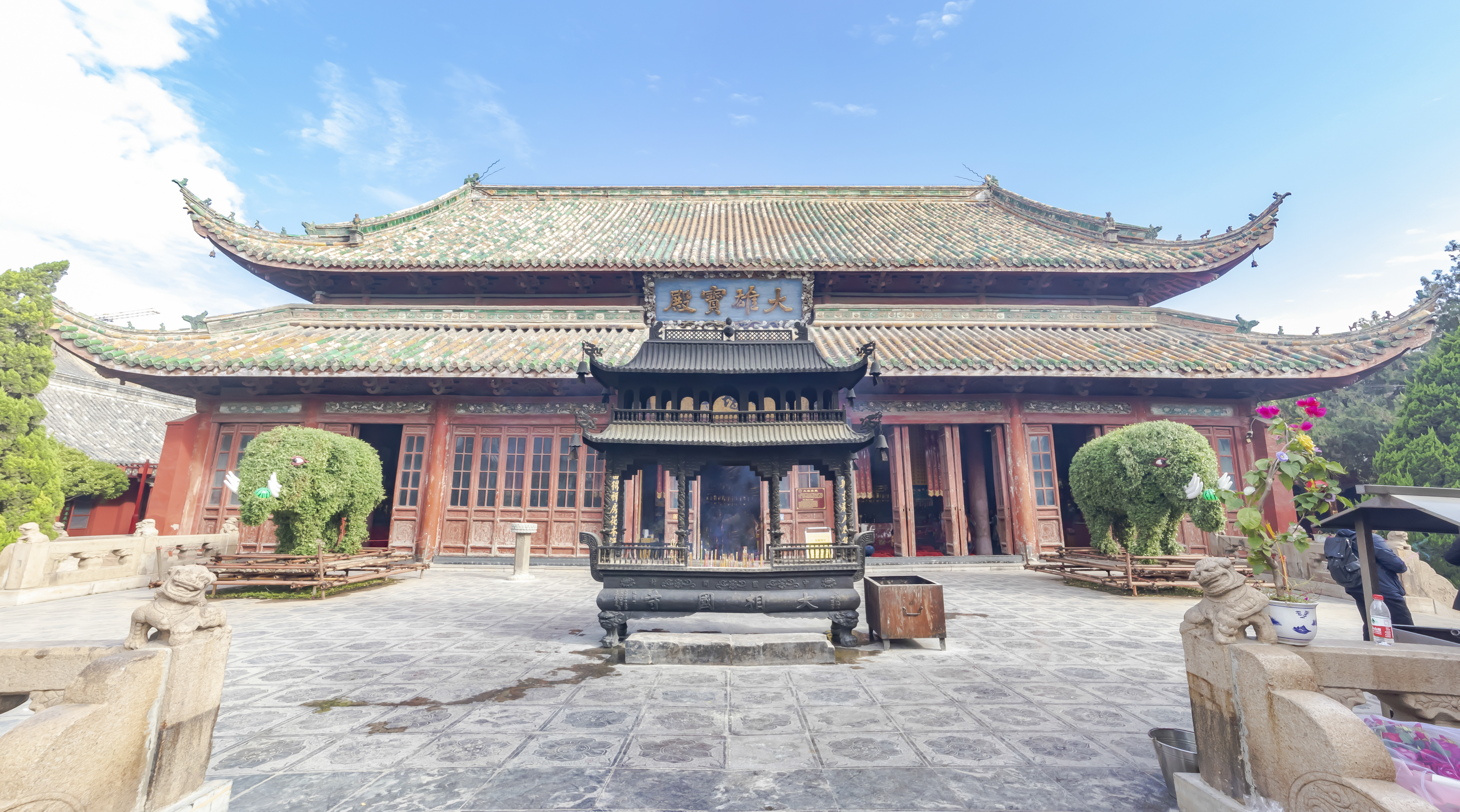
Early Qing dynasty (1644–1912) Daxiong Baodian of Daxiangguo Temple in Kaifeng, Henan, China. Built in 1661.

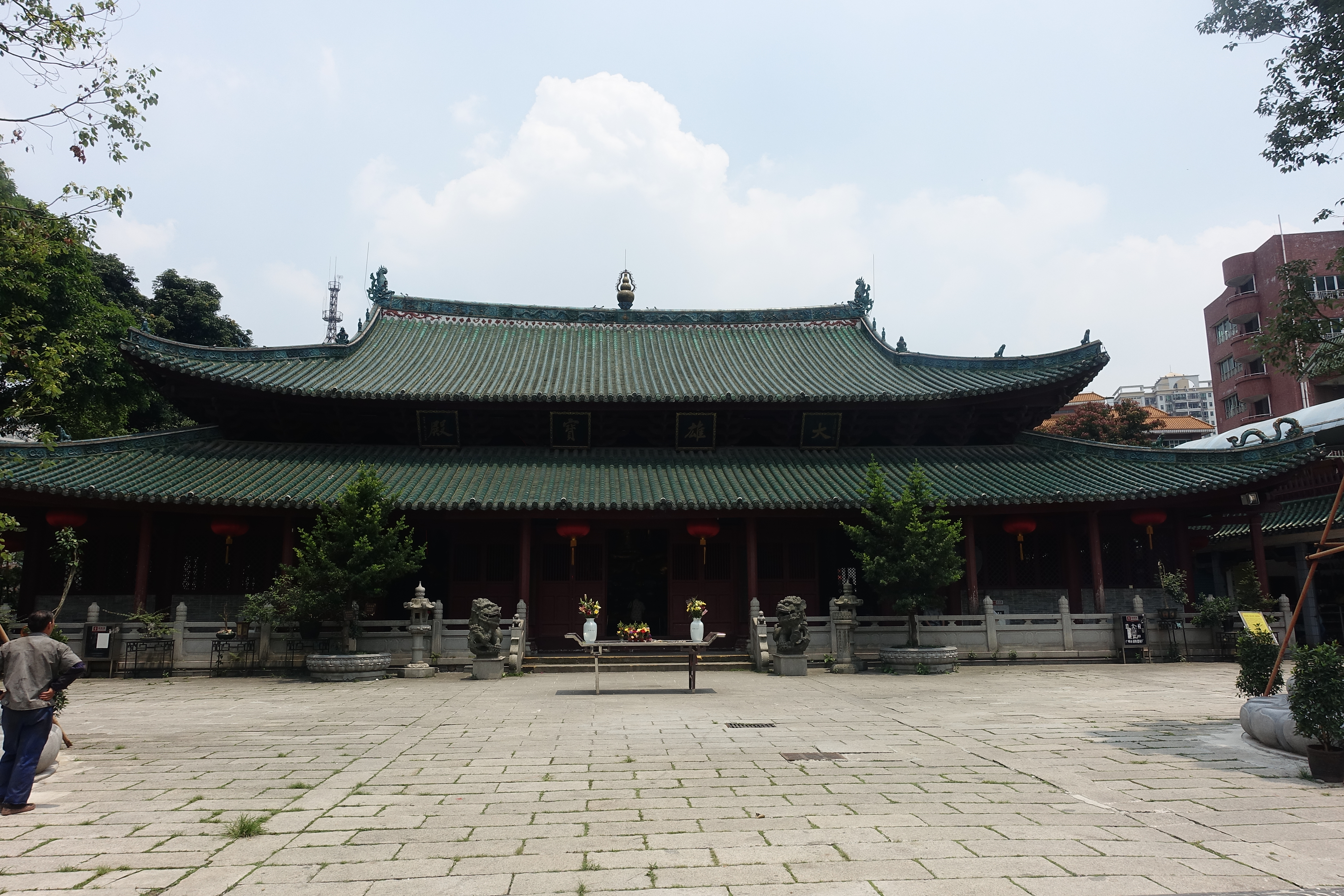
Early Qing dynasty (1644–1912) Daxiong Baodian of Hoi Tong Monastery in Guangzhou, Guangdong, China. Built in 1666.

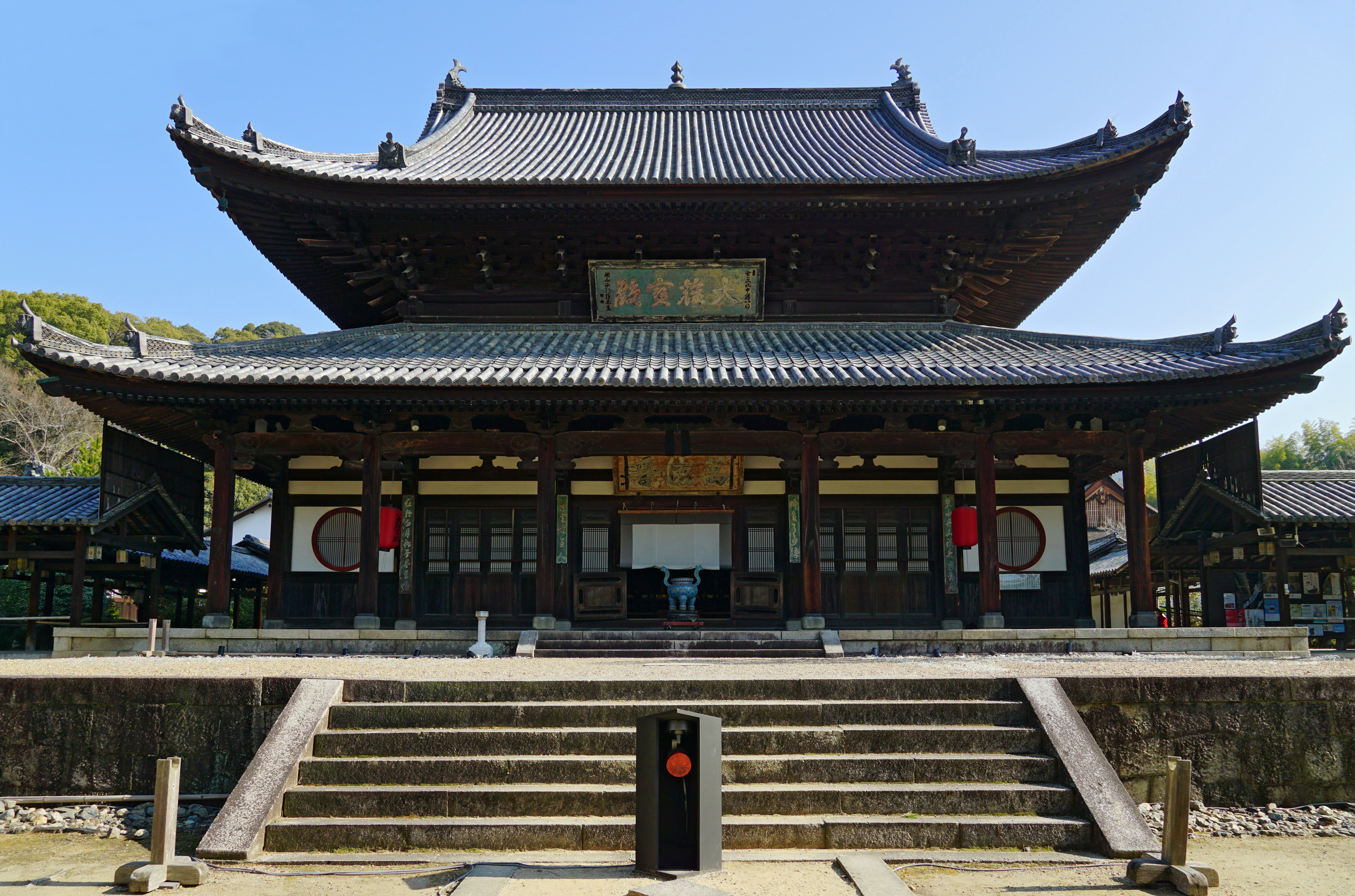
Early Edo period (1600–1868) Daiyū Hōden of Manpuku-ji in Uji, Kyoto, Japan. Built in 1668.

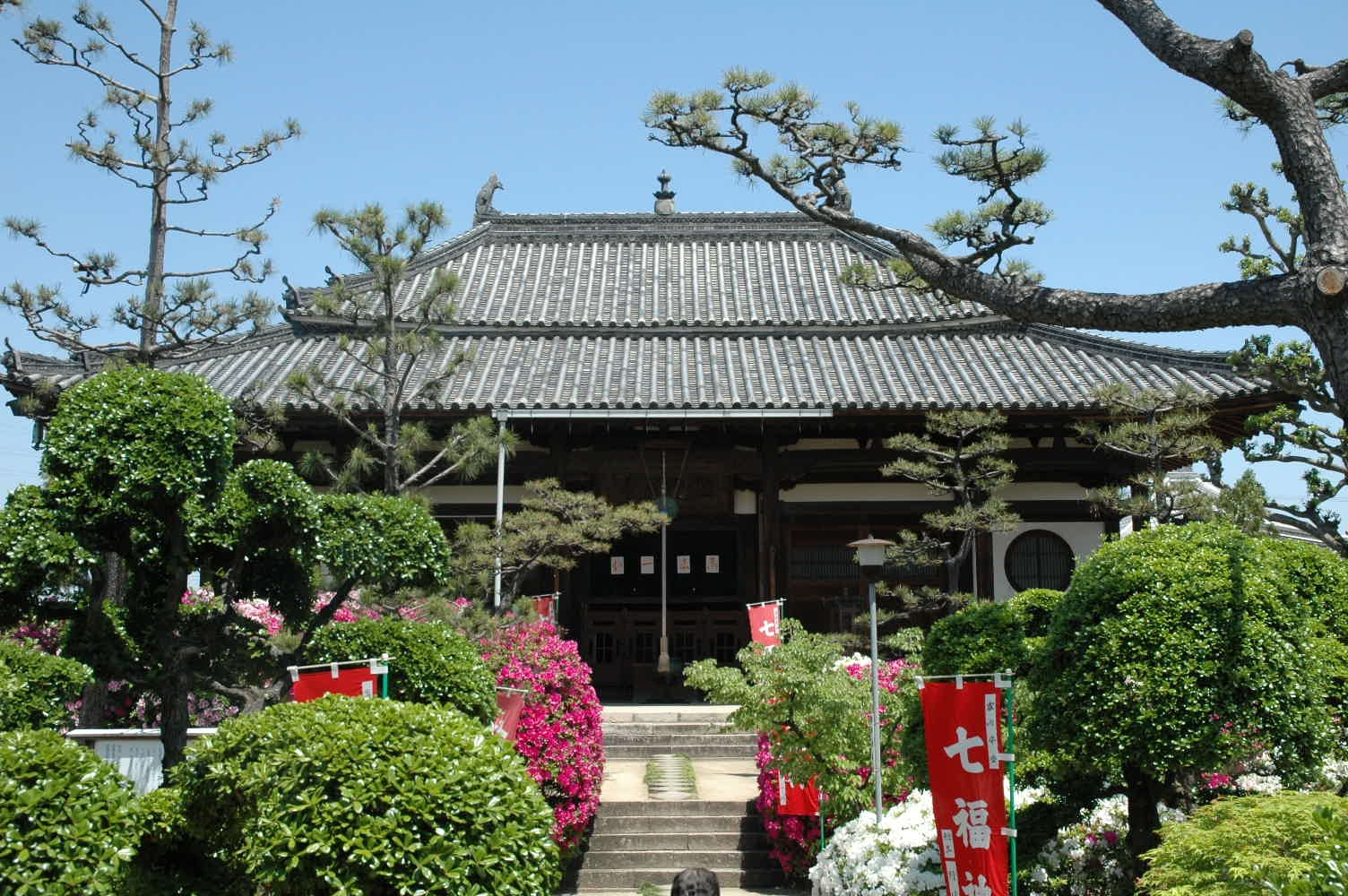
Edo period (1600–1868) Daiyū Hōden of Hōun-ji in Sakai, Osaka, Japan. Built in 1684.

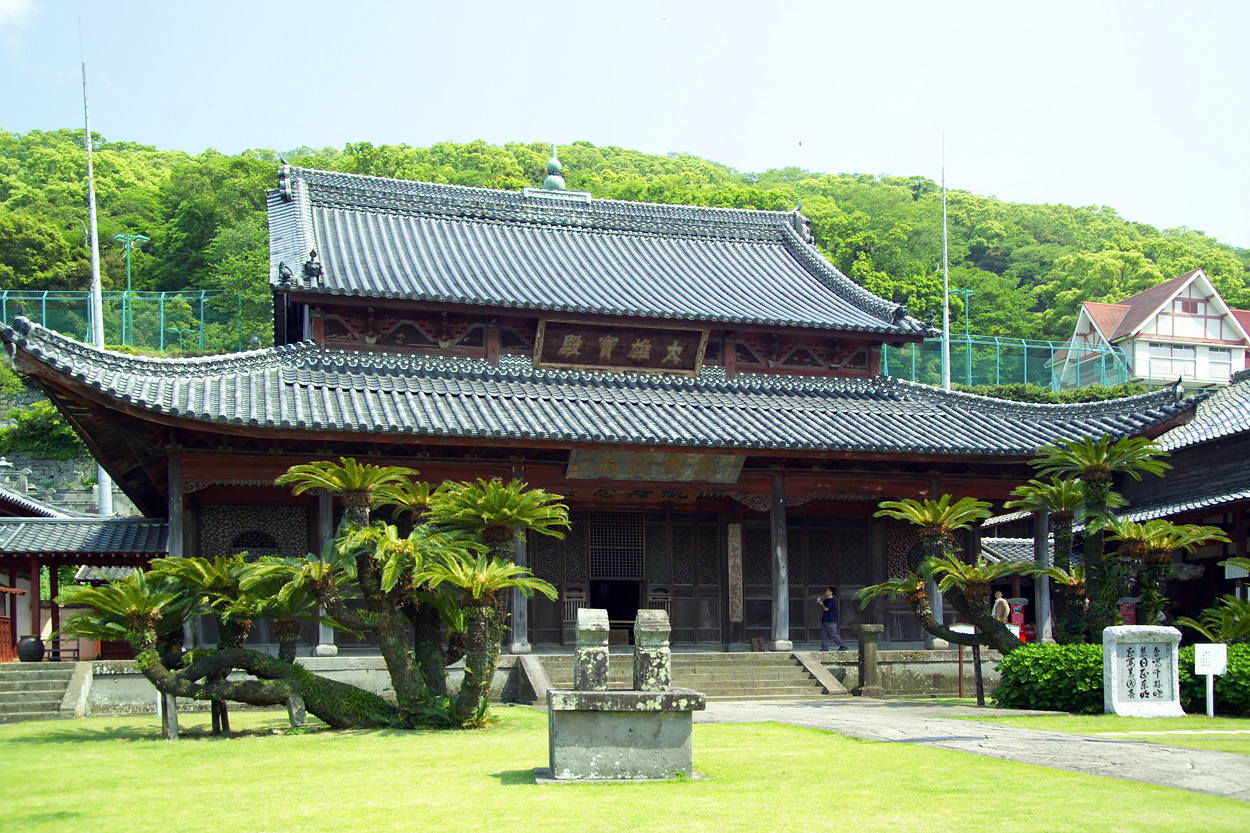
Edo period (1600–1868) Daiyū Hōden of Kōfuku-ji in Nagasaki, Nagasaki, Japan. Built in 1689.

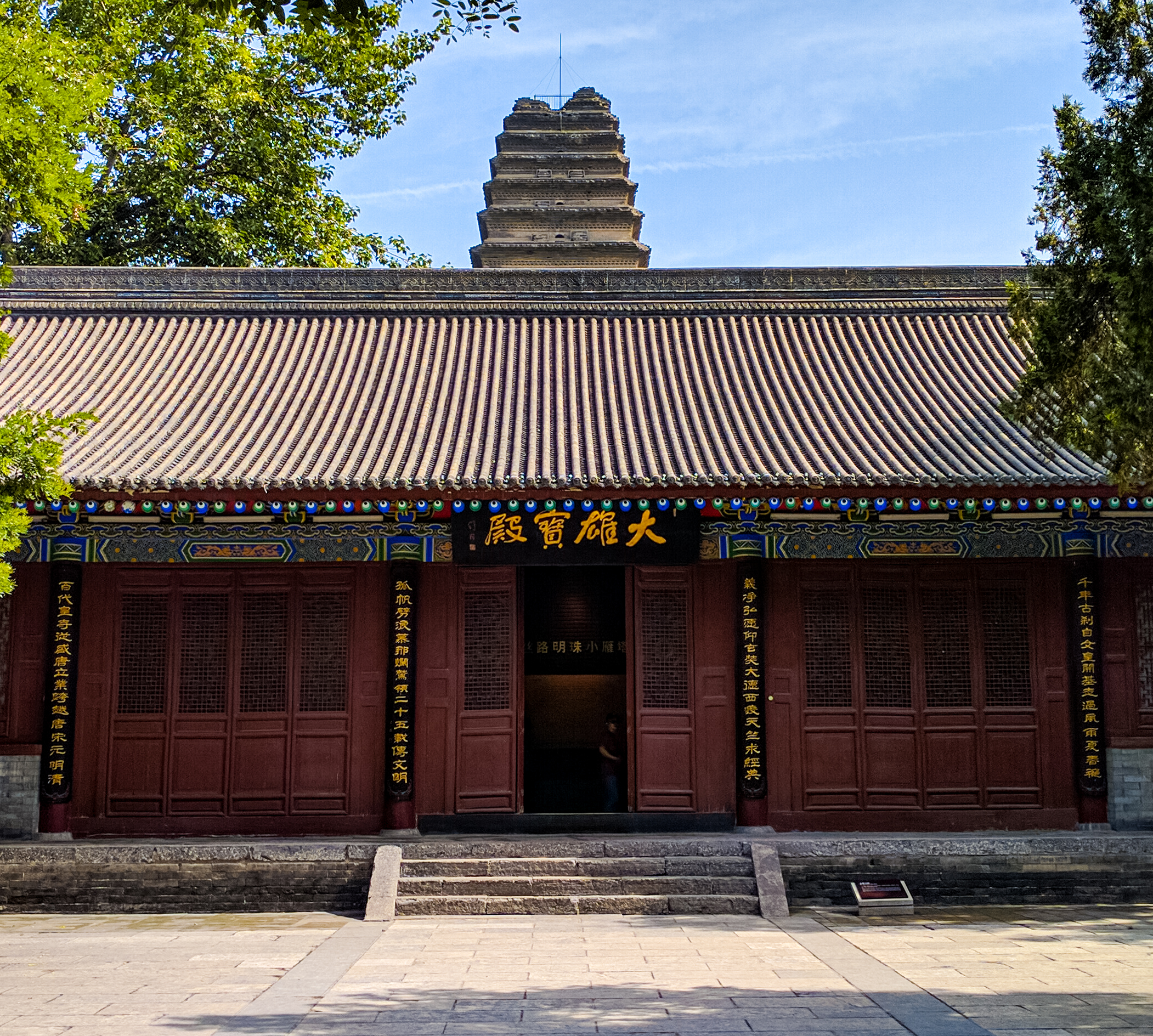
Qing dynasty (1644–1912) Daxiong Baodian of Jianfu Temple in Xi'an, Shaanxi, China. Rebuilt in 1692.

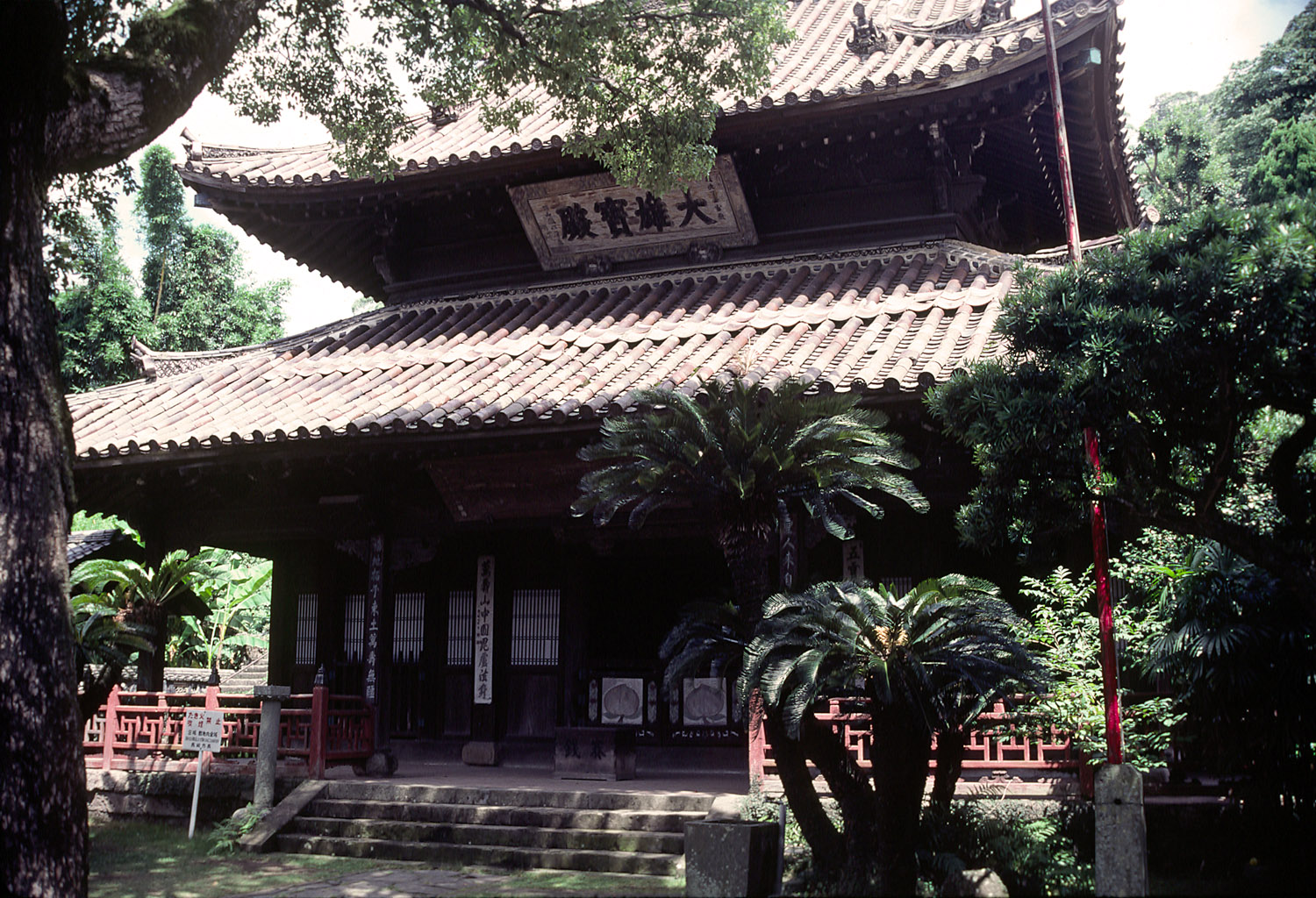
Edo period (1600–1868) Daiyū Hōden of Shōfuku-ji in Nagasaki, Nagasaki, Japan. Built in 1697.

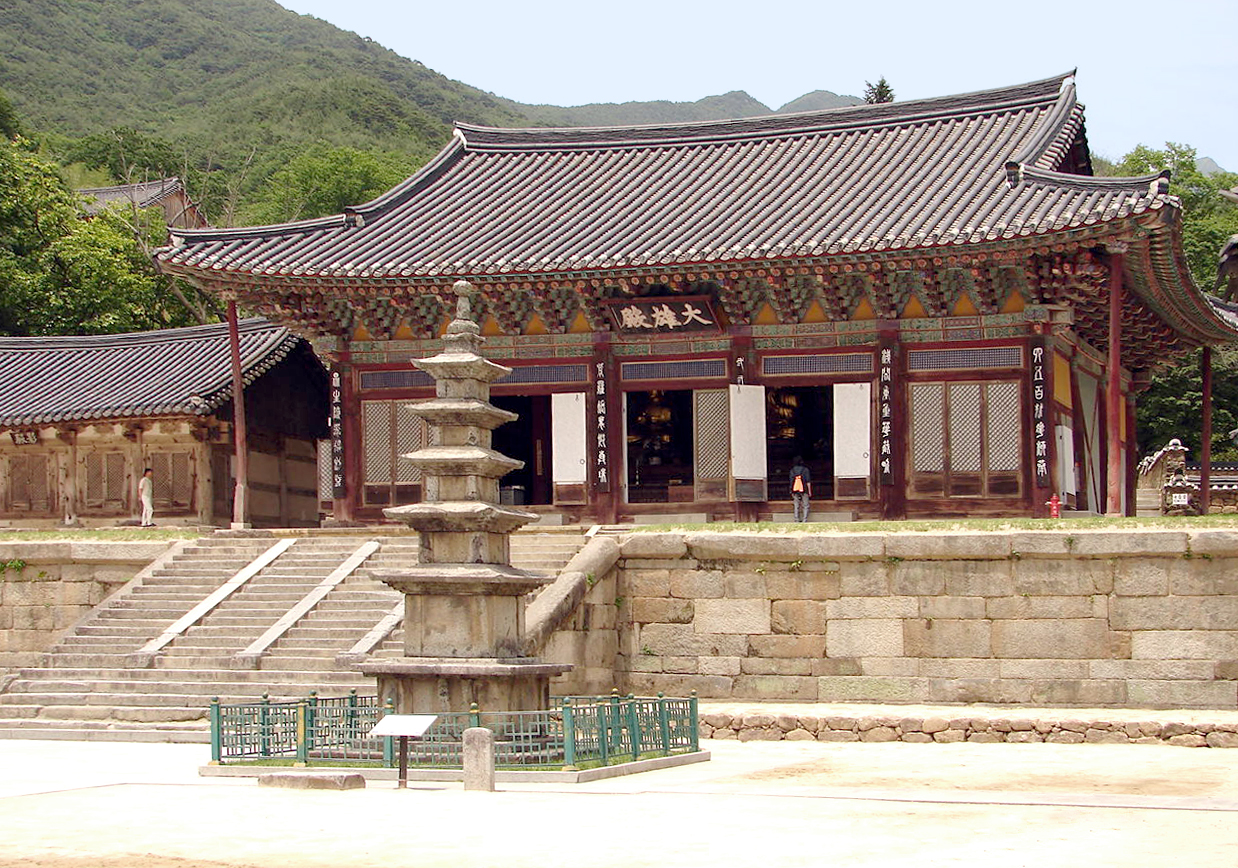
Joseon dynasty (1392–1897) Daeungjeon of Hwaeomsa in Gurye, South Jeolla, South Korea. Built in 1701.

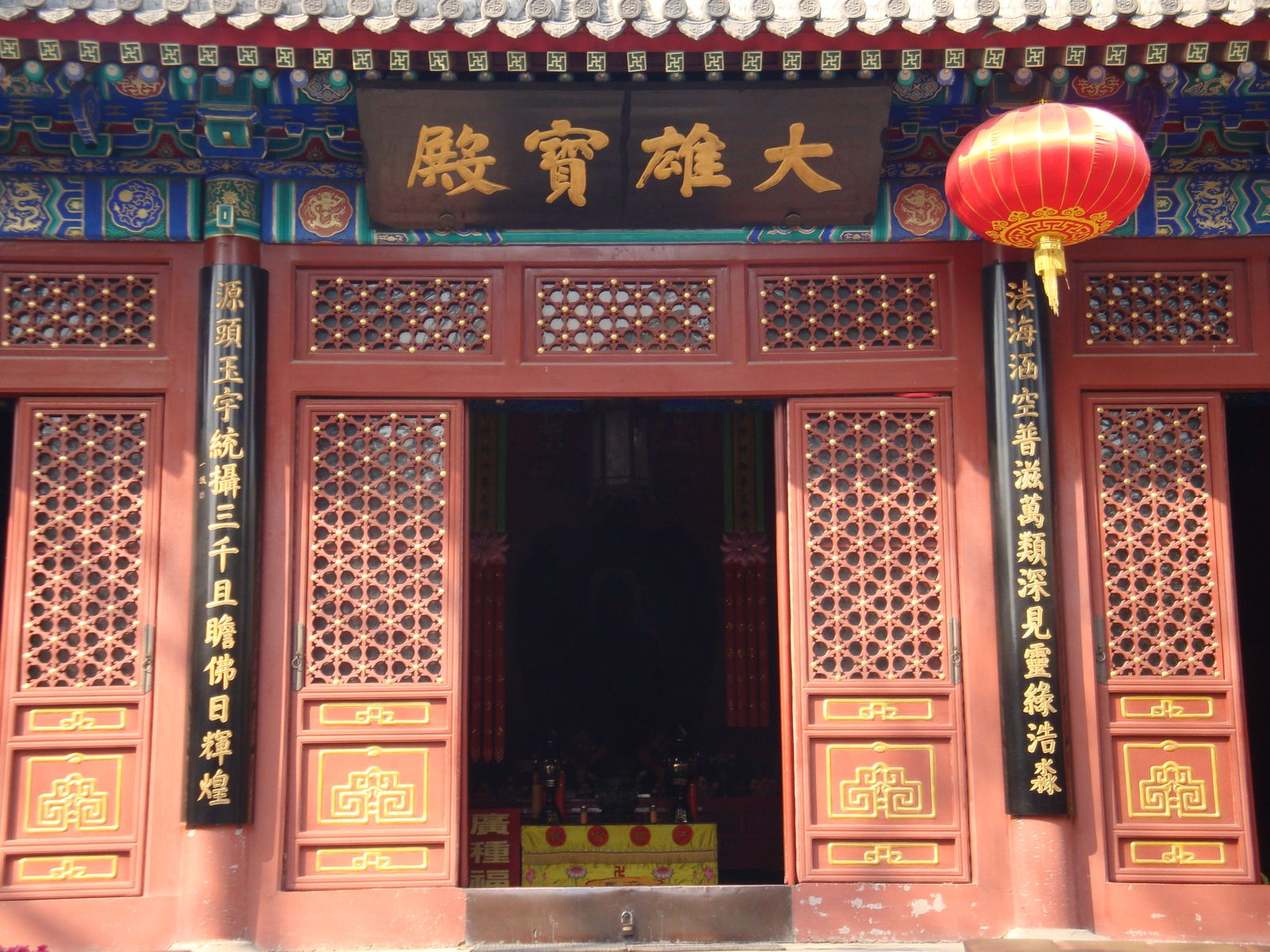
Qing dynasty (1644–1912) Daxiong Baodian of Fayuan Temple in Beijing, China.

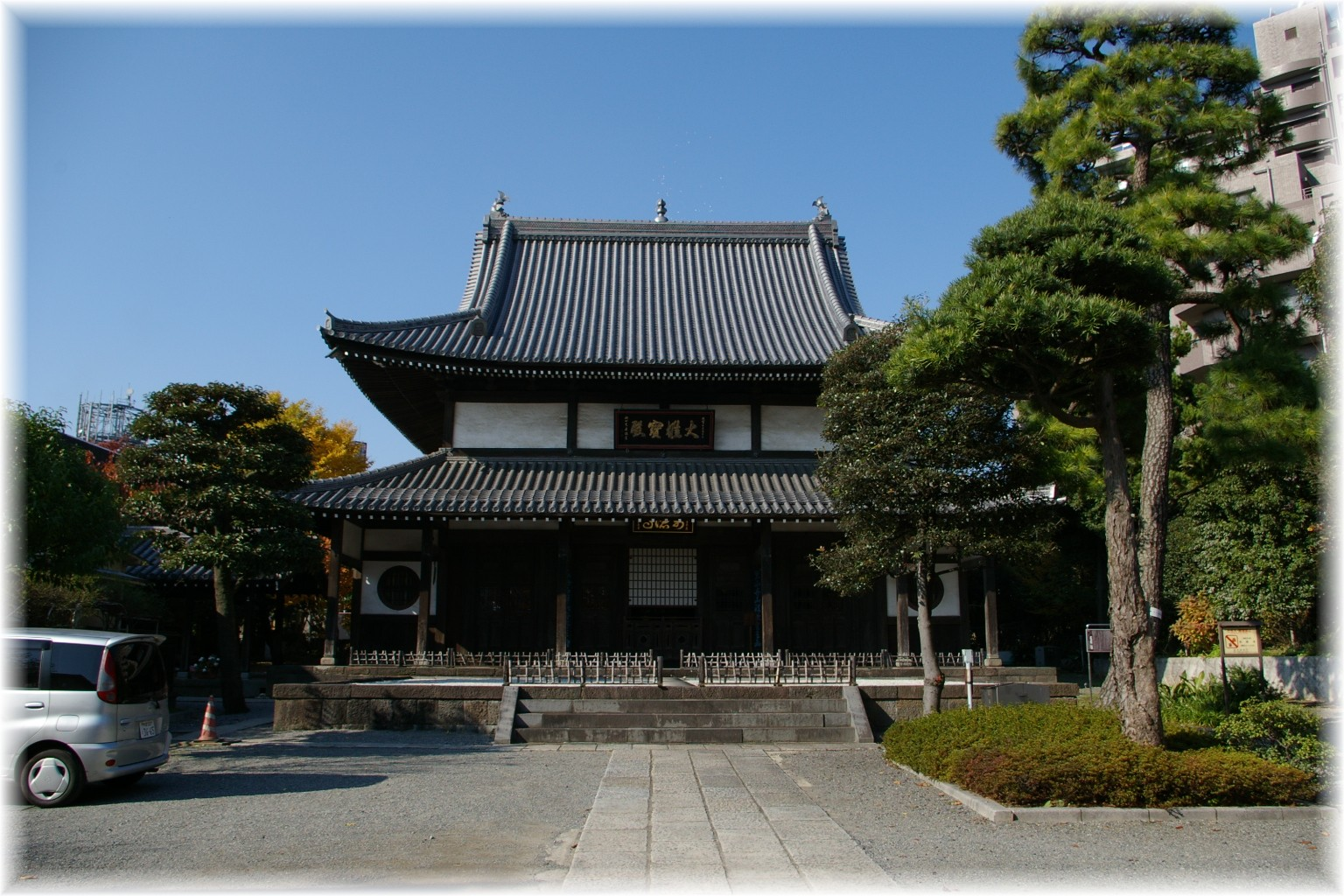
Edo period (1600–1868) Daiyū Hōden of Zuishō-ji in Tokyo, Japan. Built in 1757.

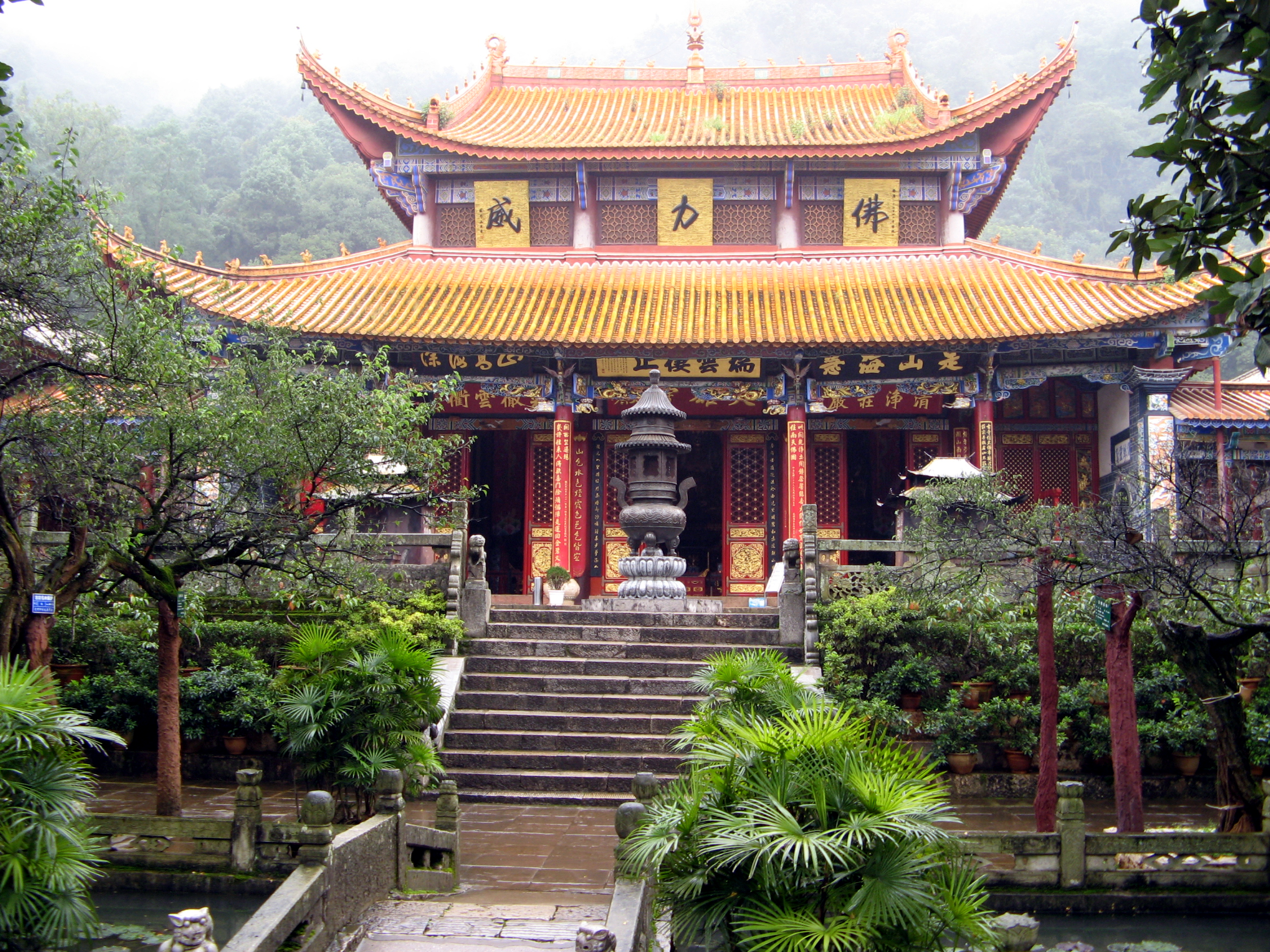
Late Qing dynasty (1644–1912) Daxiong Baodian of Huating Temple in Kunming, Yunnan, China. Rebuilt in 1883.

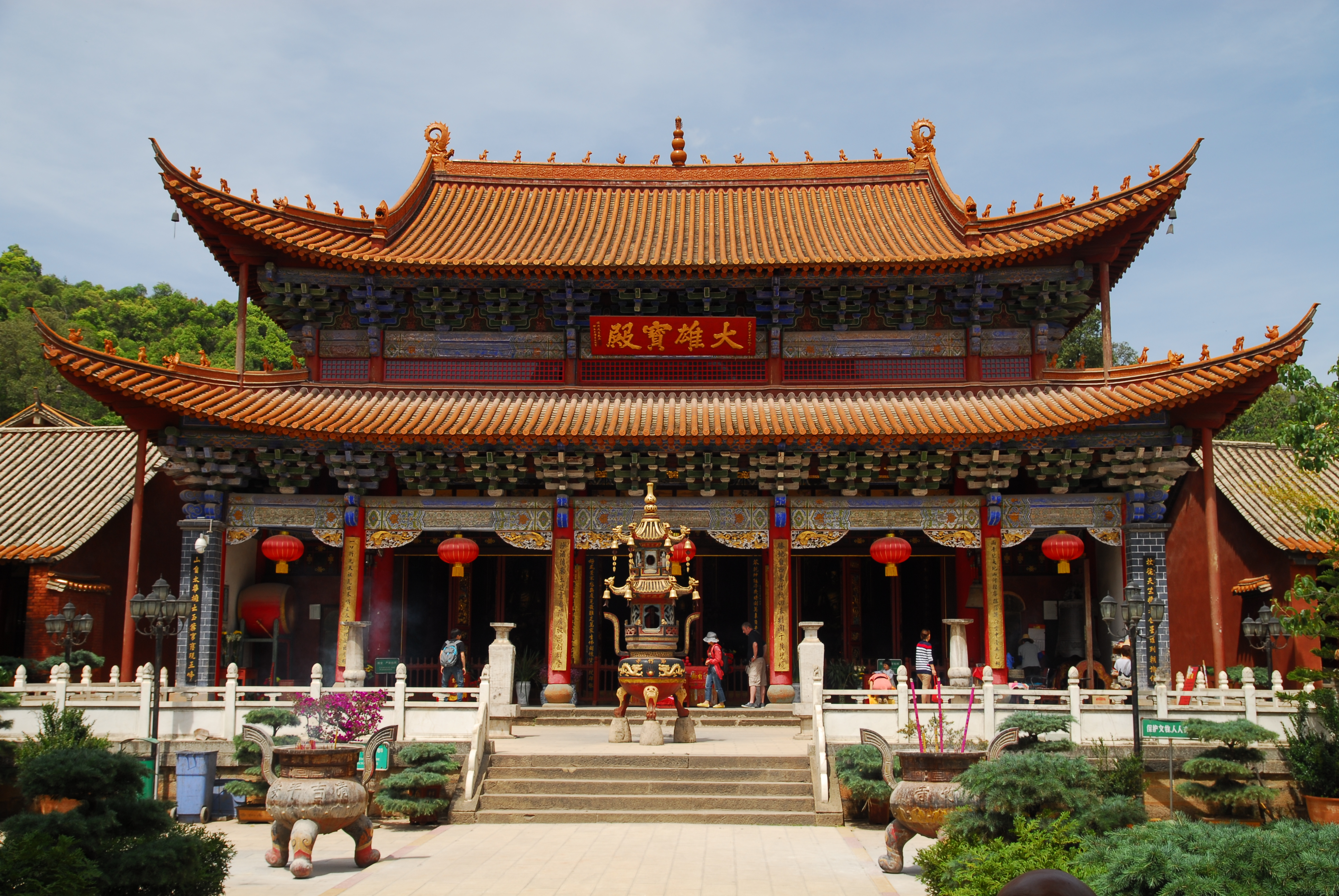
Late Qing dynasty (1644–1912) Daxiong Baodian of Qiongzhu Temple near Kunming, Yunnan, China. Rebuilt from 1883 to 1890.

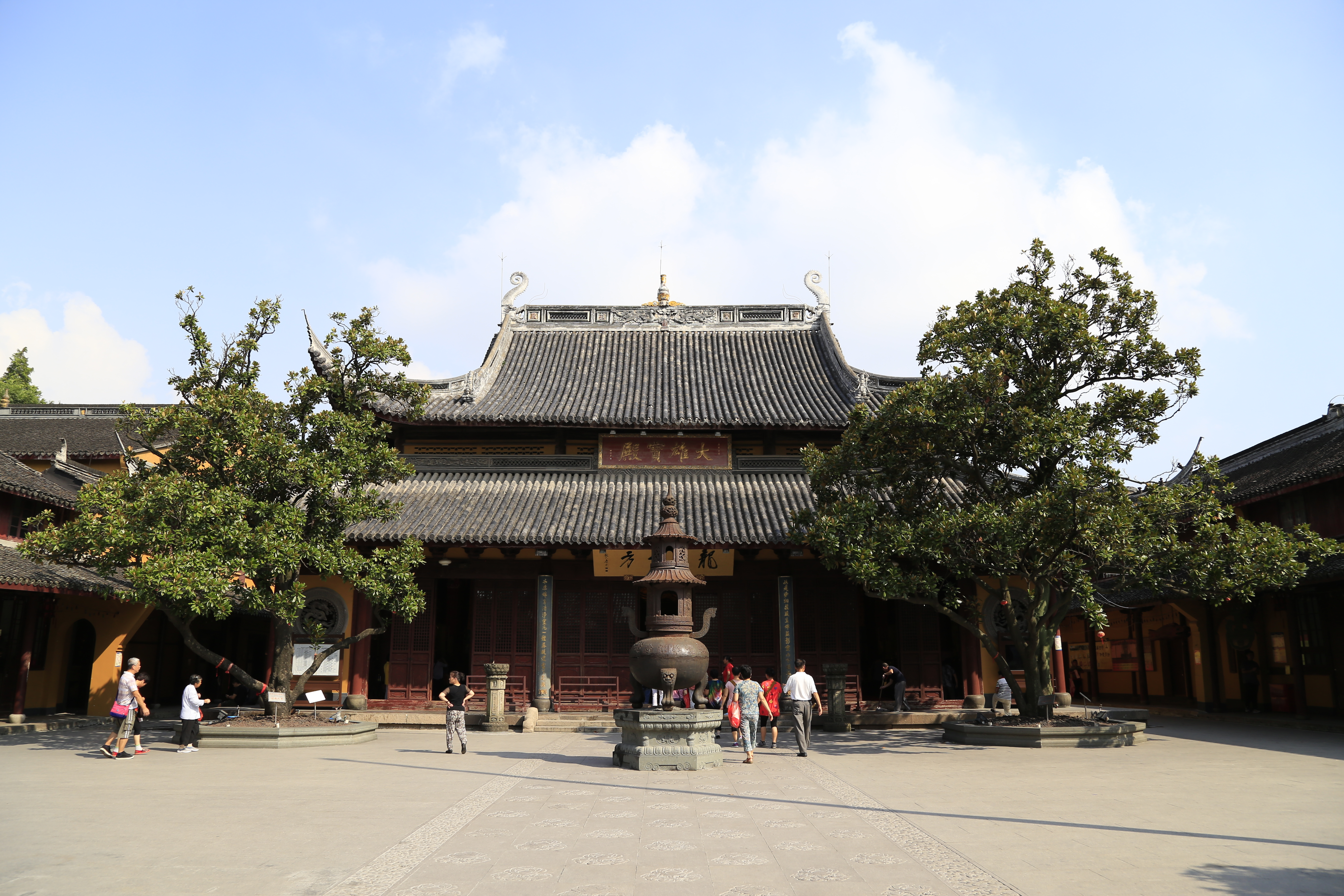
Late Qing dynasty (1644–1912) Daxiong Baodian of Longhua Temple in Shanghai, China. Rebuilt during the reign of the Guangxu Emperor (1875 -1908).

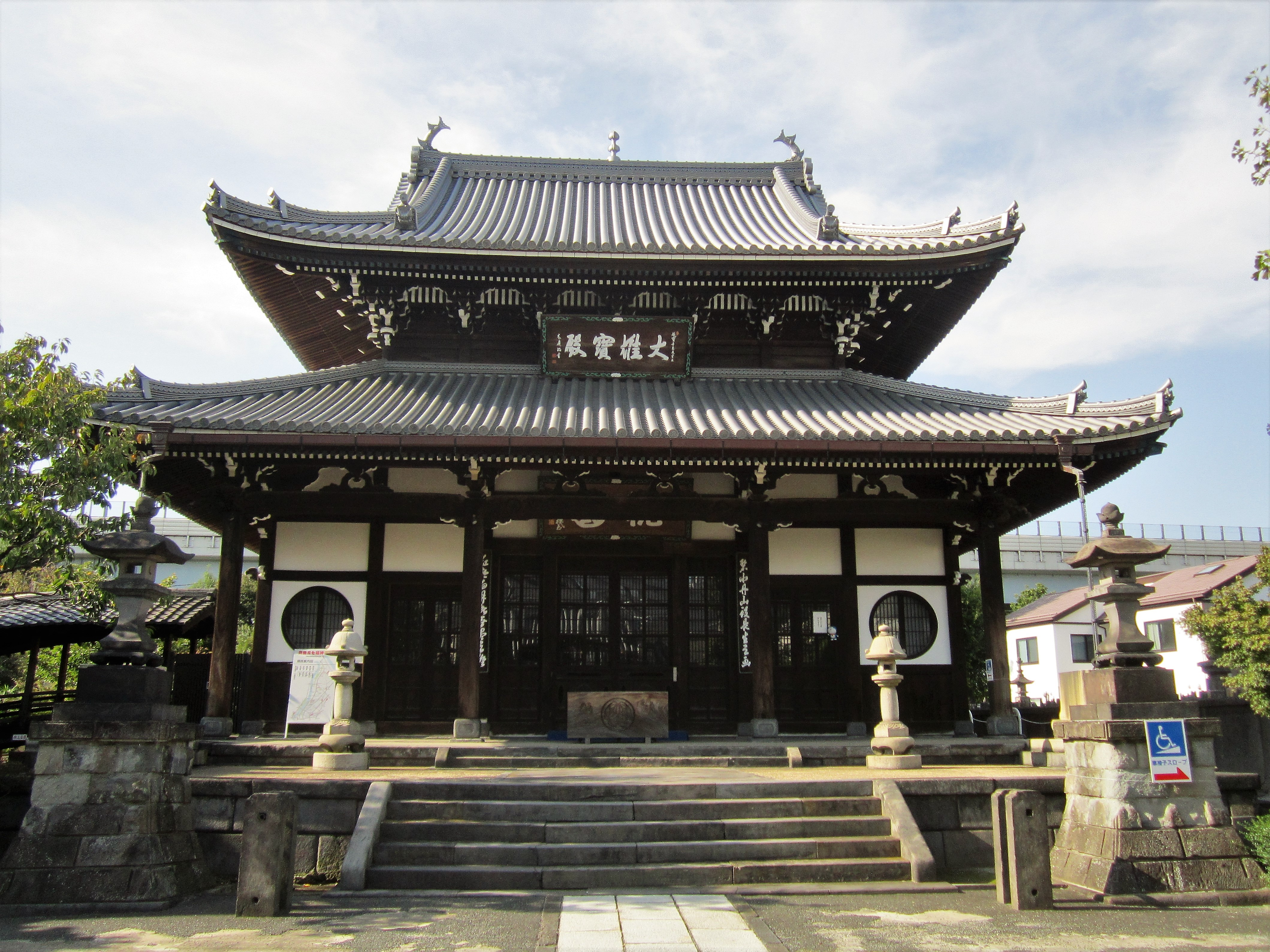
Daiyū Hōden of Kōfuku-ji in Tokyo, Japan. Rebuilt in 1933.

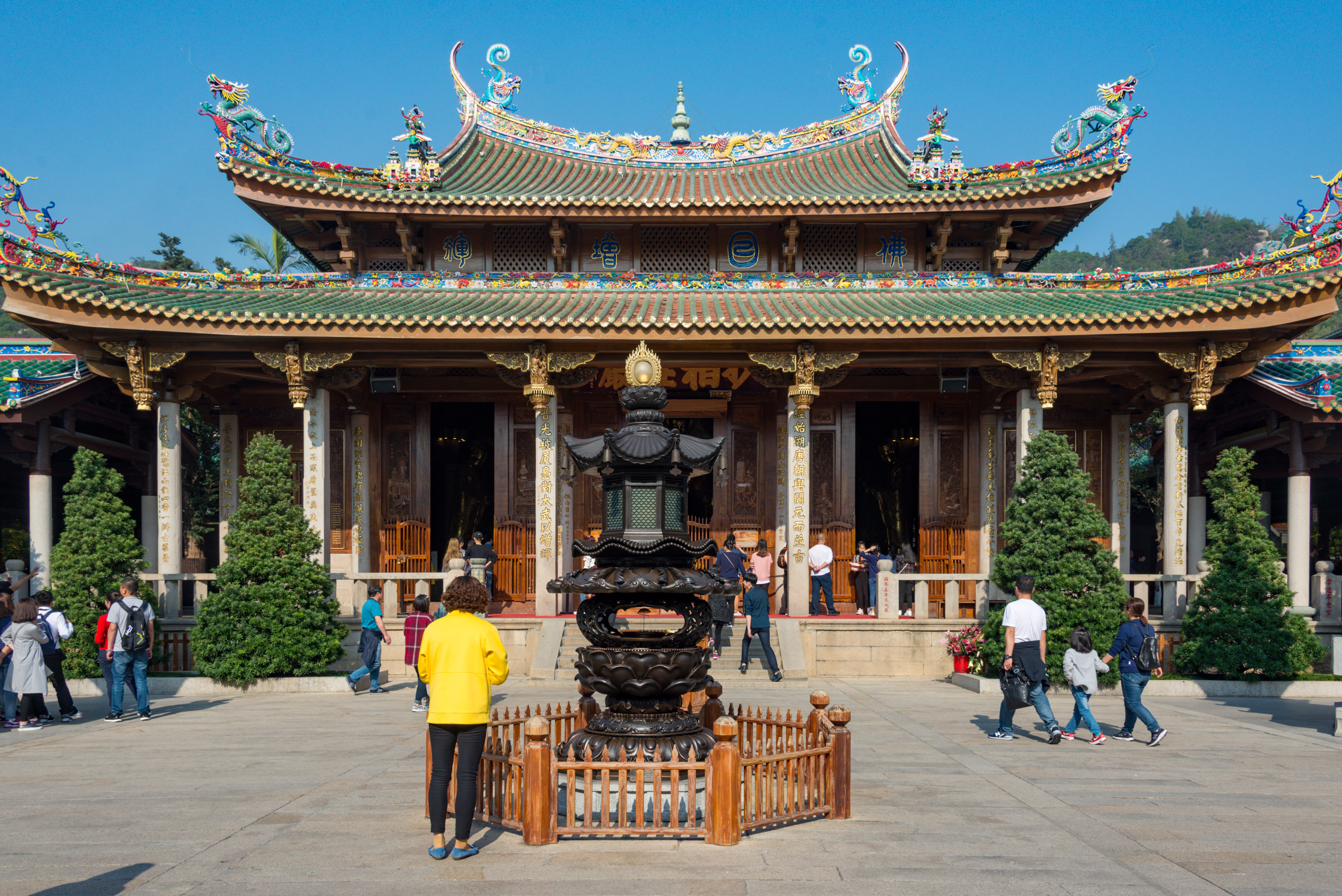
Daxiong Baodian of Nanputuo Temple in Xiamen, Fujian, China. Rebuilt in 1932.

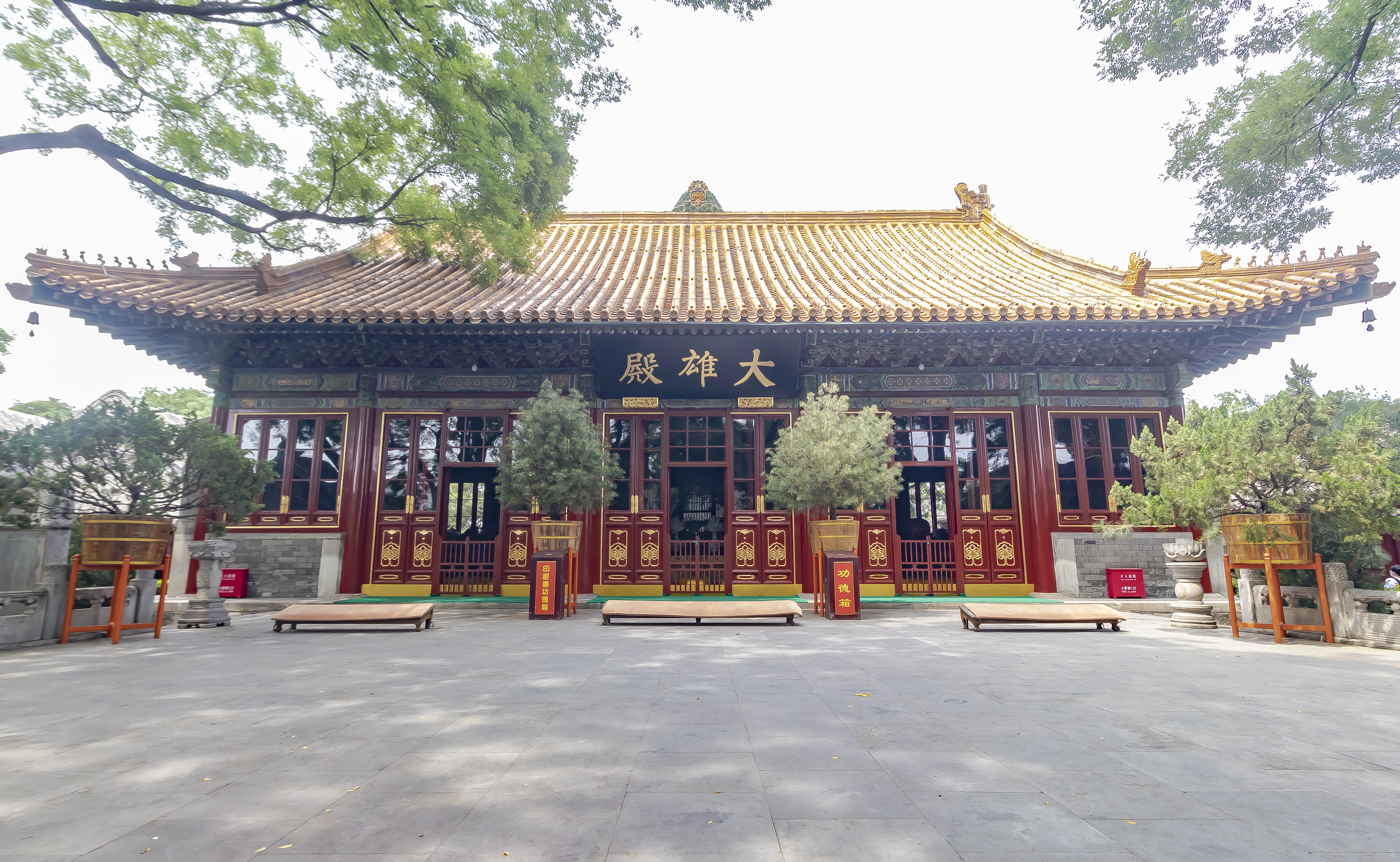
Daxiong Baodian of Guangji Temple in Beijing, China. Rebuilt in 1935.

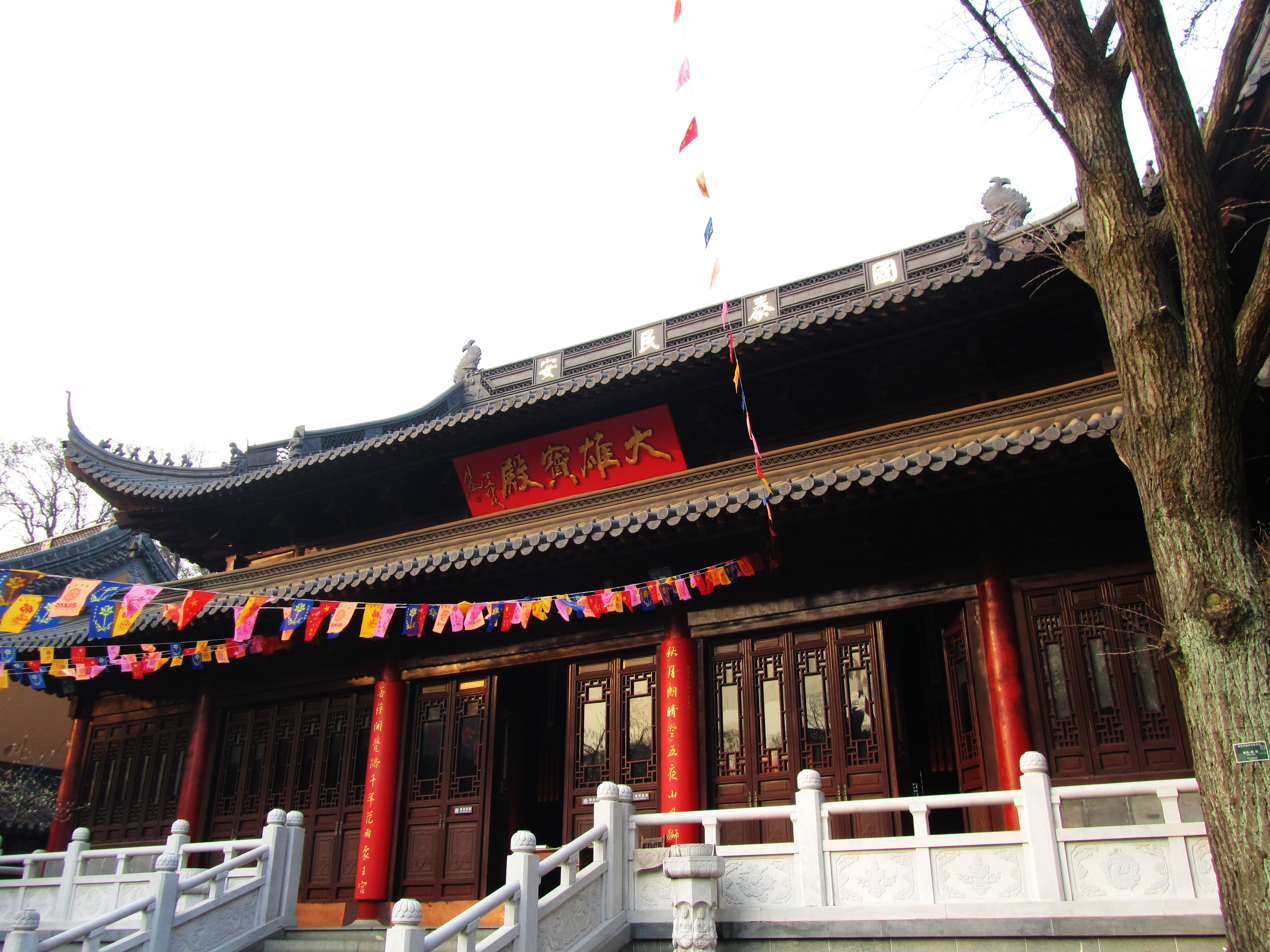
Daxiong Baodian of Linggu Temple in Nanjing, Jiangsu, China. Rebuilt in 1980.

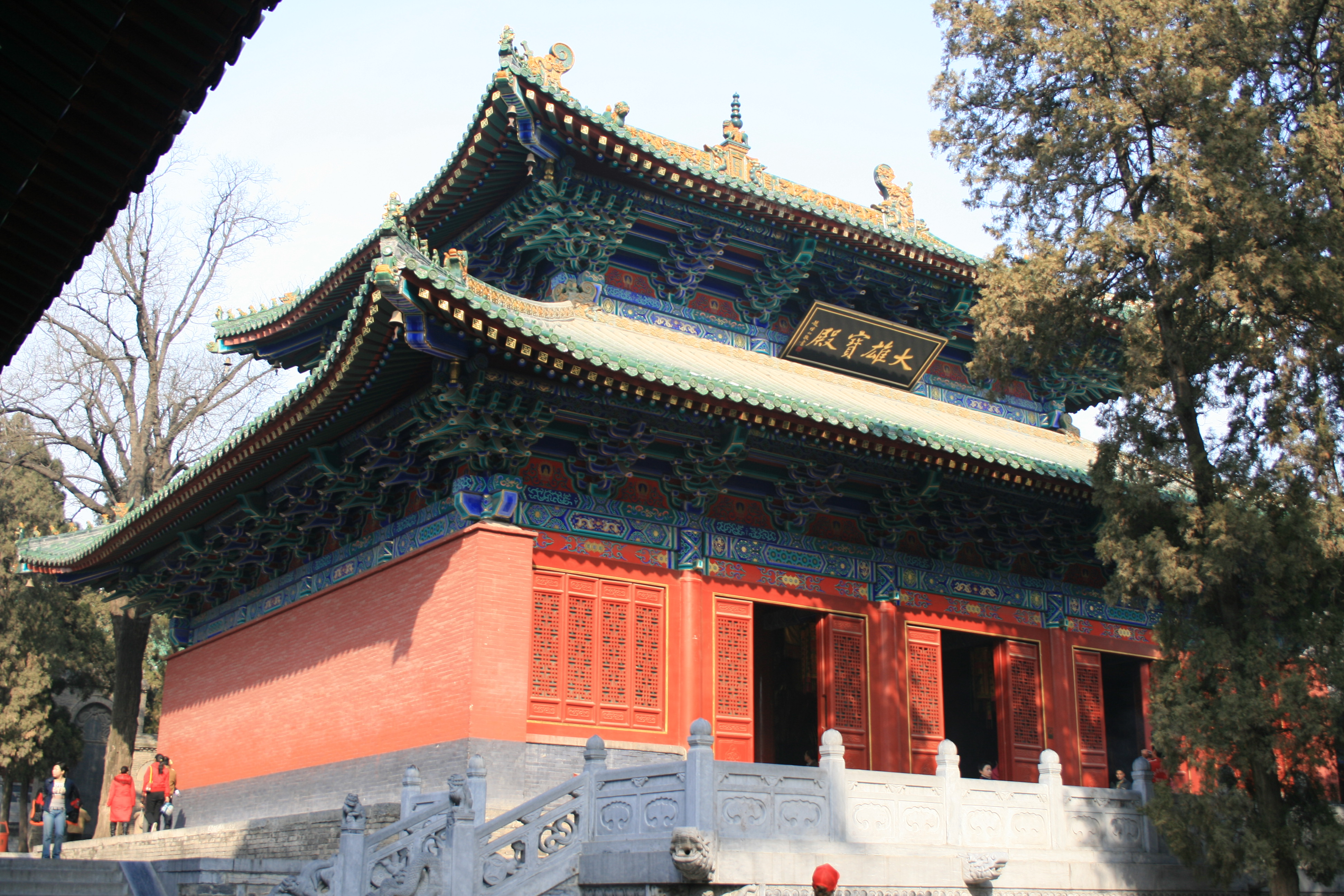
Daxiong Baodian of Shaolin Temple in Dengfeng, Henan, China. Rebuilt in 1985.

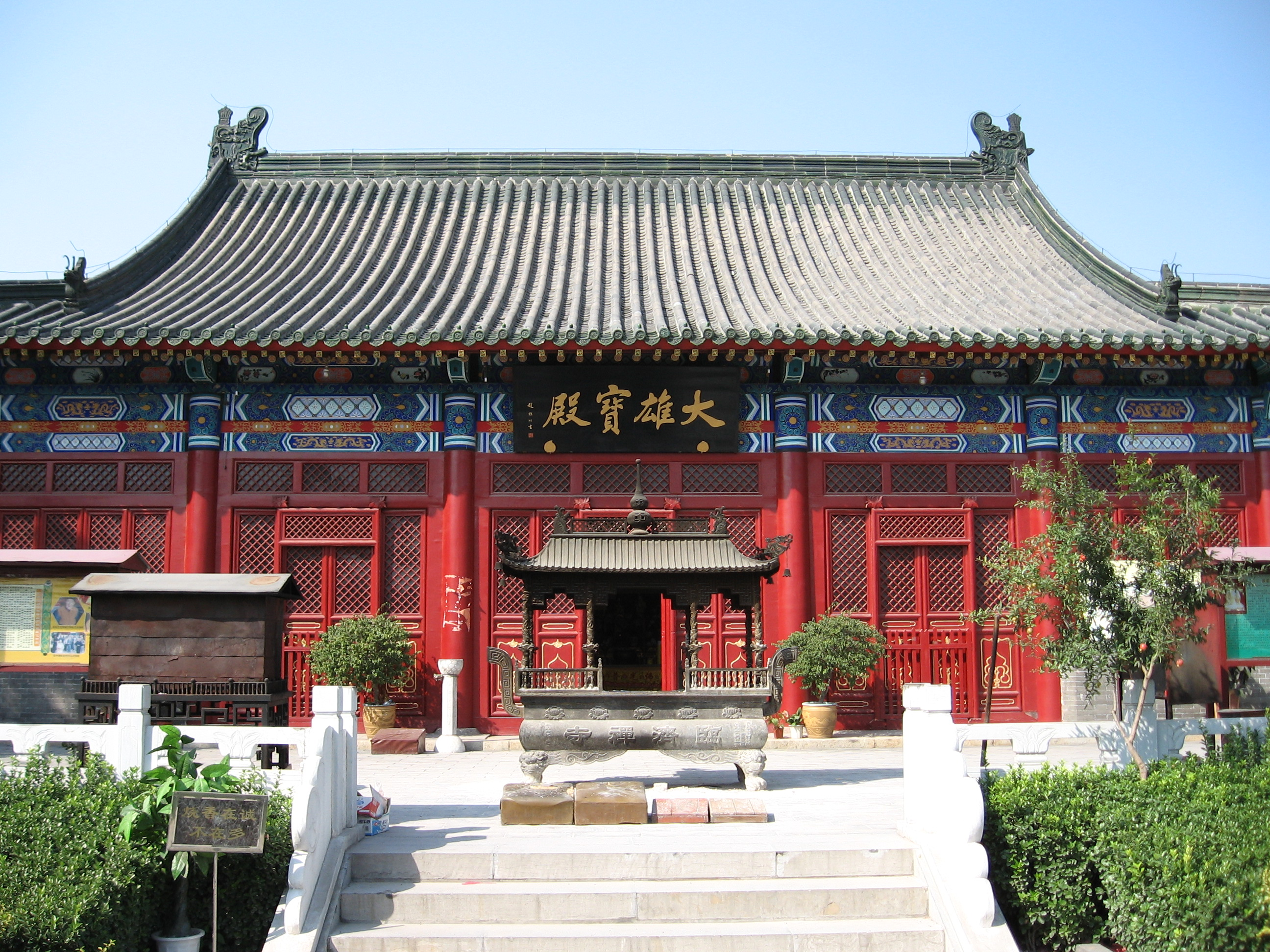
Daxiong Baodian of Linji Temple in Zhengding, Hebei, China. Rebuilt in 1987.

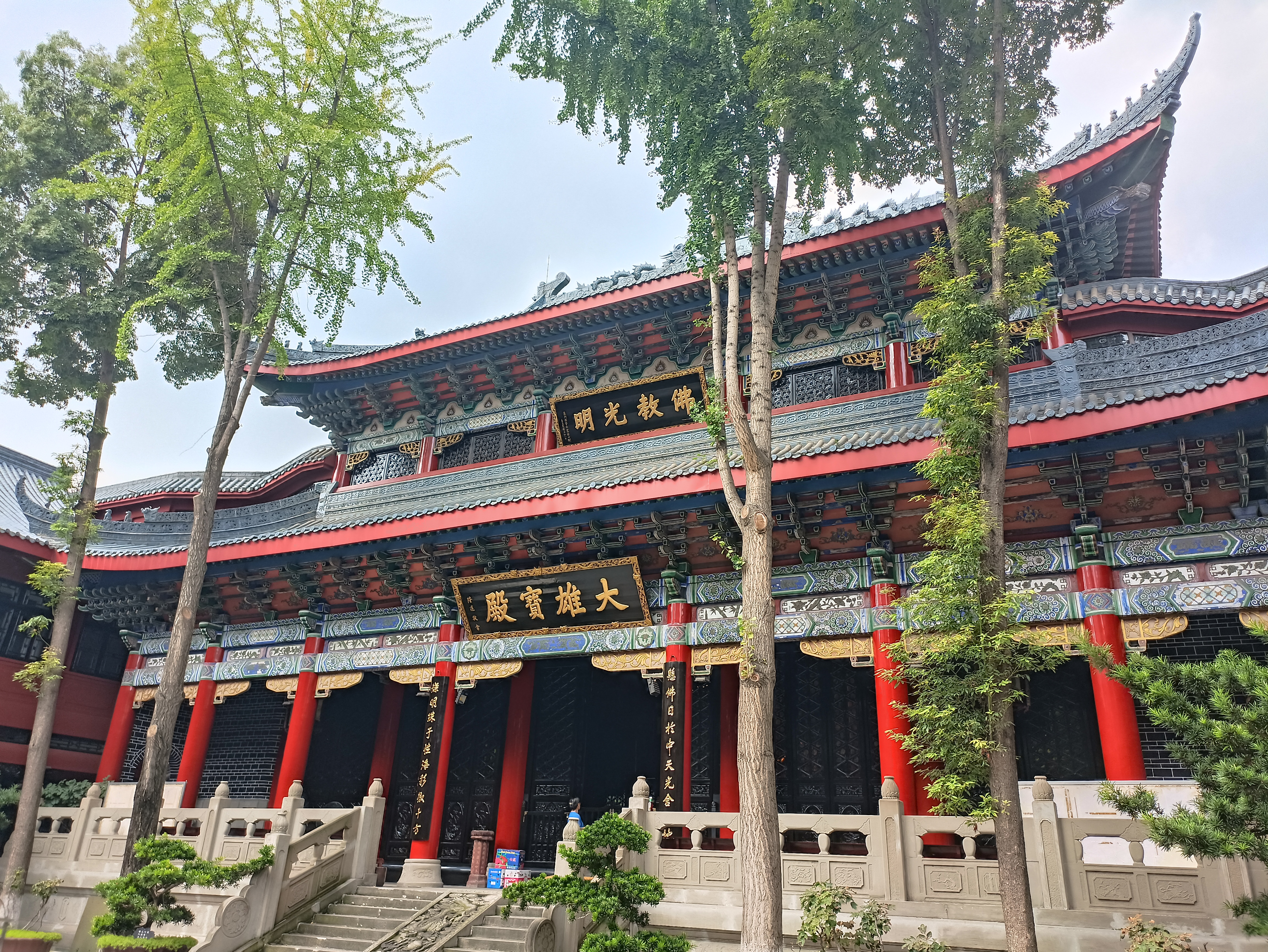
Daxiong Baodian of Aidaotang Nunnery in Chengdu, Sichuan, China. Rebuilt in 2000.

== See also ==
- Hall of Four Heavenly Kings, another common hall in Chinese, Korean and Japanese Ōbaku Zen Buddhist temples
- Guanyin Hall
- Lustral basin
- Japanese Buddhist Main Halls, some of which are Chinese-style Mahavira Halls
- Beopdang, main hall in Korean temples
