= Huating Temple =

Buddhist temple in Yunnan, China

- 华亭寺
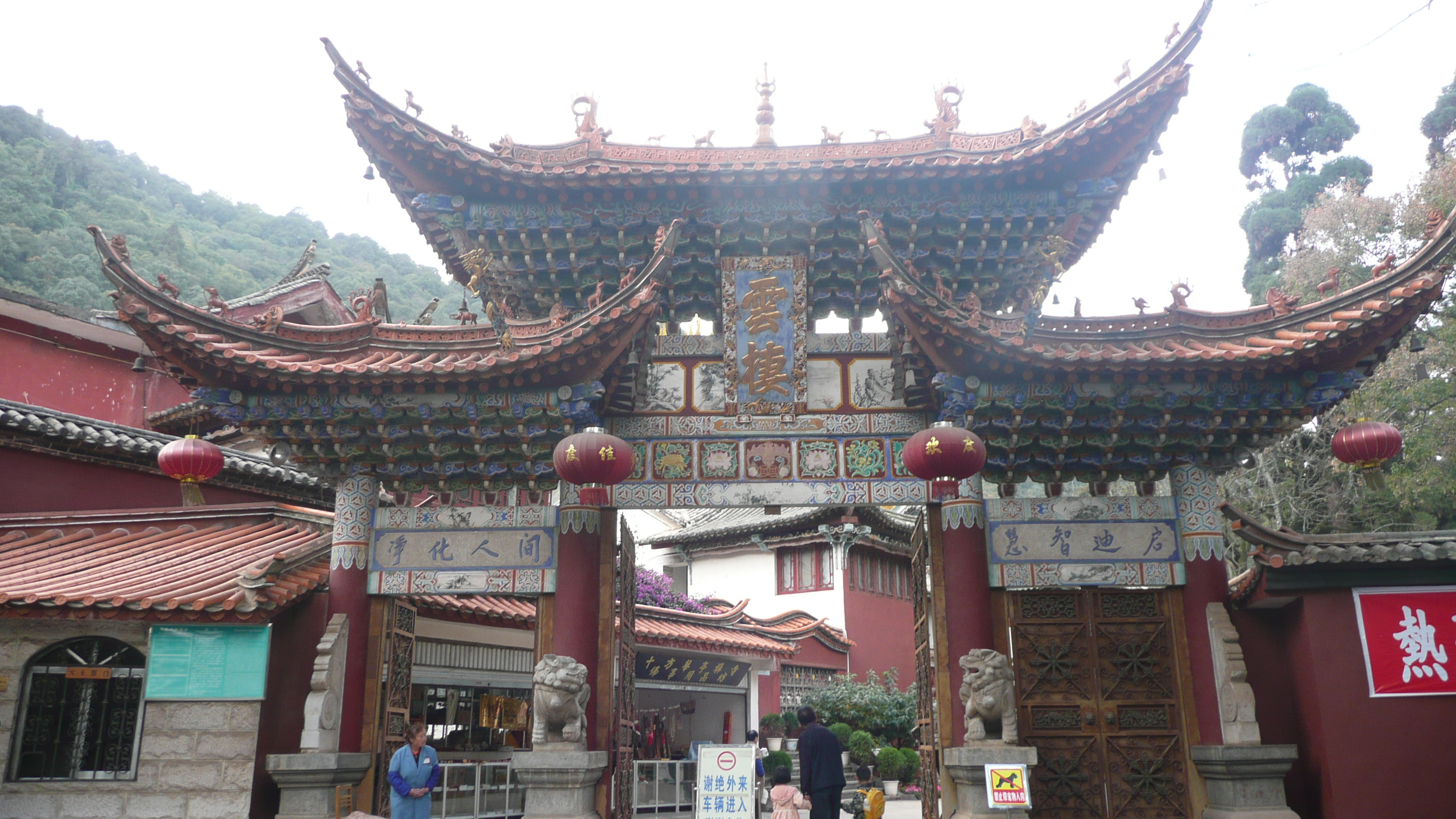
- A paifang in front of Huating Temple.

- Location within Yunnan Location within China

Religion
- Affiliation: Buddhism
- Sect: Weiyang school
- Leadership: Shi Xinming (释心明)

Location
- Location: Xishan District, Kunming, Yunnan
- Country: China
- Interactive map of Huating Temple
- Coordinates: 24°58′39″N 102°38′03″E

Architecture
- Style: Chinese architecture
- Founder: Xuantong Yuanfeng
- Established: 1320
- Completed: 1334

Huating Temple (simplified Chinese: 华亭寺; traditional Chinese: 華亭寺; pinyin: Huátíng Sì) is a Buddhist temple located in Xishan District of Kunming, Yunnan, China.

== History ==
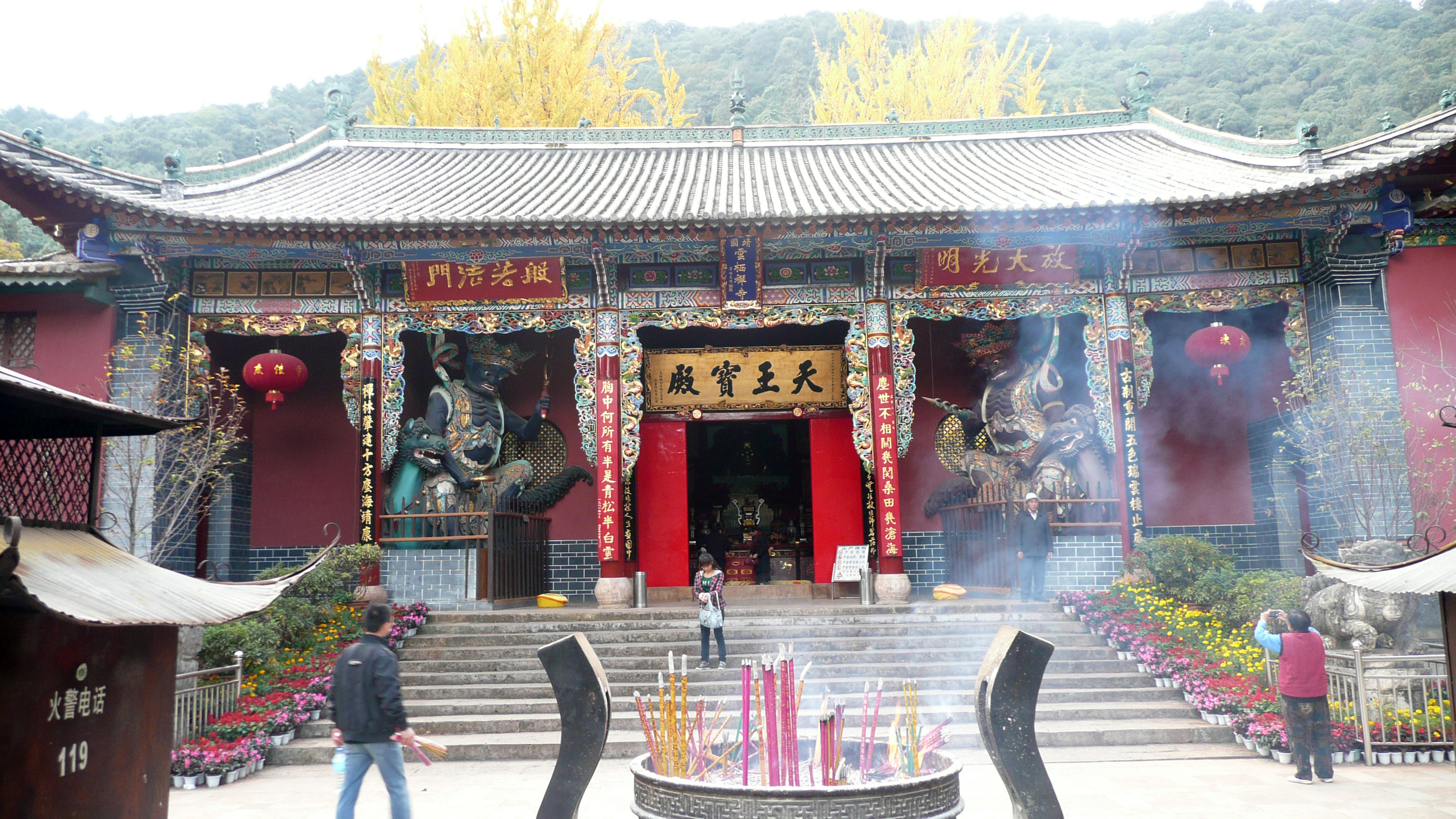
The Hall of Four Heavenly Kings.

=== Yuan dynasty ===
The temple was first established by Xuantong Yuanfeng (玄通元峰) in 1320, during the mid-Yuan dynasty (1271–1368). The construction was completed in 1334. In 1339, Xuantong Yuanfeng brought a set of Chinese Buddhist canon to the temple after he visited Jiangnan. At that time it initially called "Yuanjue Temple" (圆觉寺).

=== Ming dynasty ===
In 1441, Emperor Yingzong of the Ming dynasty (1368–1644) renamed it "Huating Temple" (华亭寺). This name has been used to date. In 1453, Emperor Yingzong sent a eunuch named Li Yi (黎义) to renovate and redecorate the temple.

After the fall of the Ming dynasty, Huating Temple was devastated by wars.

=== Qing dynasty ===
In 1687, during the reign of Kangxi Emperor (1662–1722) of the Qing dynasty (1644–1911), the provincial governor of Yunnan Wang Jiwen (王继文) rebuilt the temple.

In 1857, in the Xianfeng era (1851–1861), part of the temple was badly damaged in the Hui Uprising.

Huating Temple was restored in 1883 with a small-scale.

=== Republic of China ===
In 1920, Military Governor of Yunnan Tang Jiyao invited Hsu Yun to disseminate Buddhism. Hsu Yun supervised the reconstruction of Huating Temple.

=== People's Republic of China ===
In 1969, the Buddhist Texts Library became dilapidated for neglect. It was demolished in the following year.

Huating Temple has been designated as a National Key Buddhist Temple in Han Chinese Area by the State Council of China in 1983.

== Architecture ==
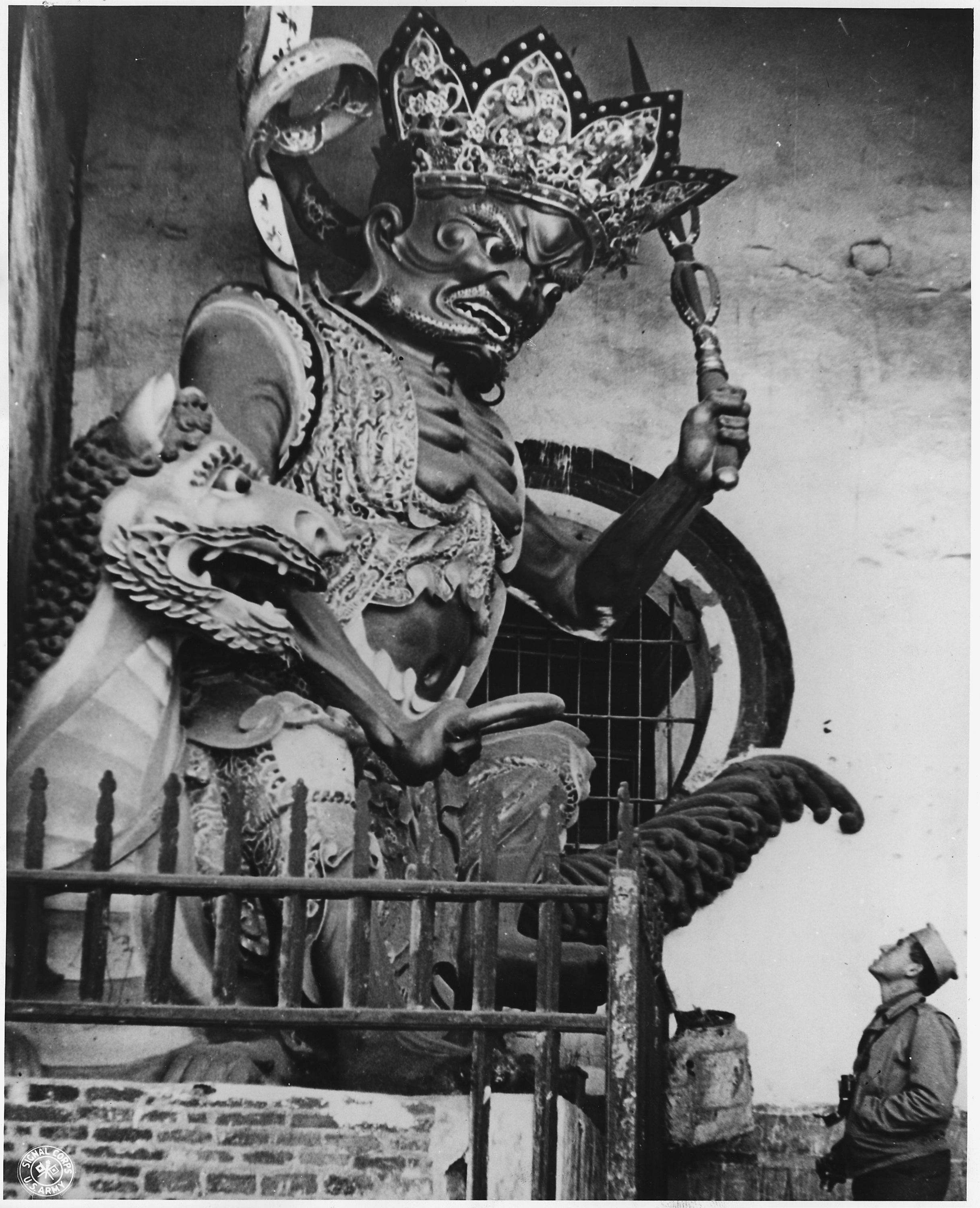
U.S. soldier admires one of the Heng and Ha.

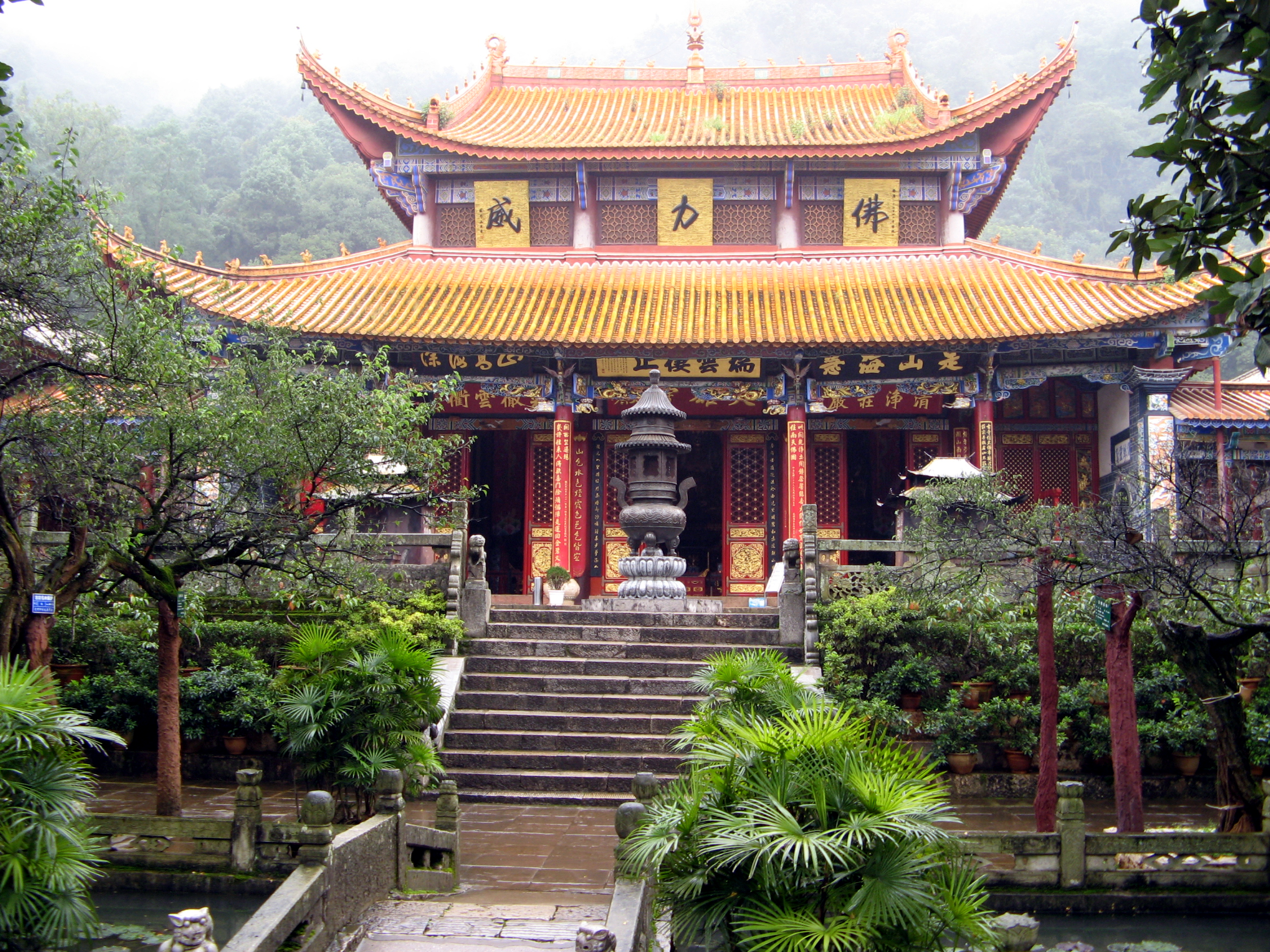
The Mahavira Hall.

Along the central axis are the Tianwang Dian, Mahavira Hall, Guanyin Dian and Zangjing Ge. There are over 10 halls and rooms on both sides, including Zushi Dian, Abbot Hall, Monastic Dining Hall, Monastic Reception Hall and Meditation Hall.

=== Tianwang Dian ===
Statues of lion and elephant stands in front of the Tianwang Dian, or Hall of the Four Heavenly Kings. On both sides of the hall there are the statues of Heng and Ha. In the center of the hall enshrines the statues of Mi Le Buddha and Weituo. Statues of Four Heavenly Kings are enshrined in the left and right side of the hall.

=== Mahavira Hall ===
The Mahavira Hall enshrining the statues of Shijiamouni, Amituofo and Yaoshi. In front of Sakyamuni stand Ananda and Kassapa Buddha on the left and right. At the back of Sakyamuni's statue are statues of Guanyin and the Twenty-four Devas. Totally 500 niches with small statues of Arhats are carved on both sides of the bounding walls.
