= List of Buddhist temples in China =

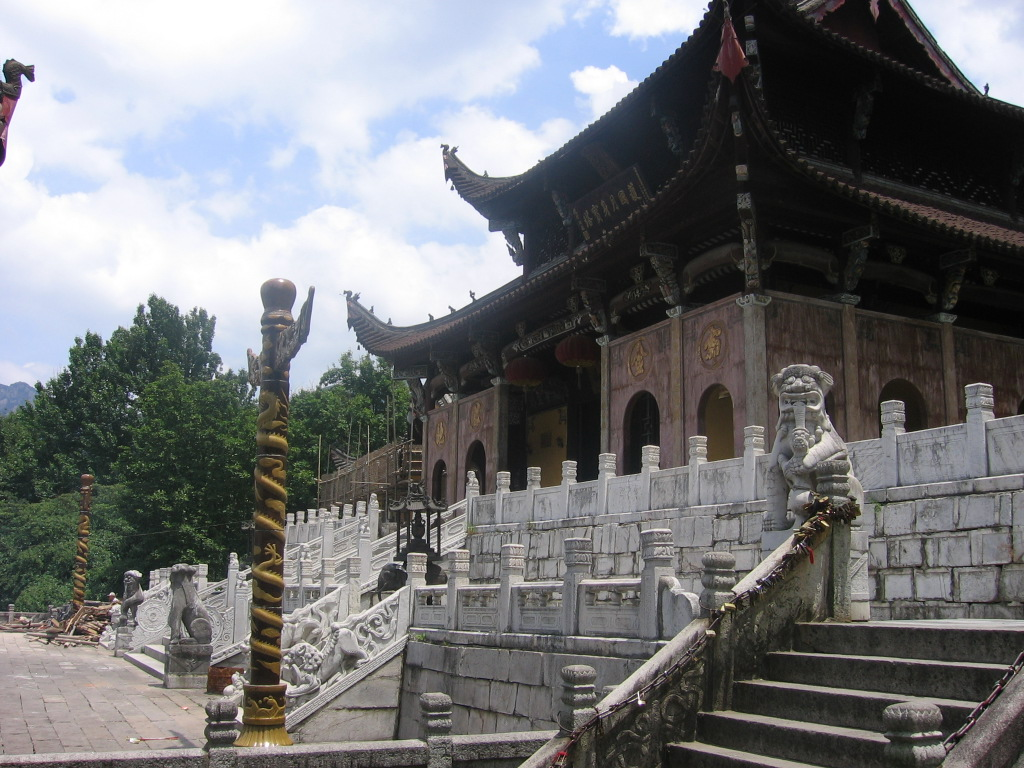
A hall in the Shrine of Living Buddha on Mount Jiuhua in Anhui

This is a list of Buddhist temples, monasteries, stupas, and pagodas in China. In this list are Wikipedia articles, sorted by location.

== Anhui ==
- Guangji Temple (Wuhu)
- Langya Temple
- Mingjiao Temple (Anhui)
- Sanzu Temple
- Yingjiang Temple
- Zhenfeng Pagoda

=== Mount Jiuhua ===
- Baisui Palace
- Ganlu Temple (Mount Jiuhua)
- Huacheng Temple
- Shangchan Temple
- Shrine of Living Buddha
- Tiantai Temple (Mount Jiuhua)
- Zhantalin
- Zhiyuan Temple (Mount Jiuhua)

== Beijing ==
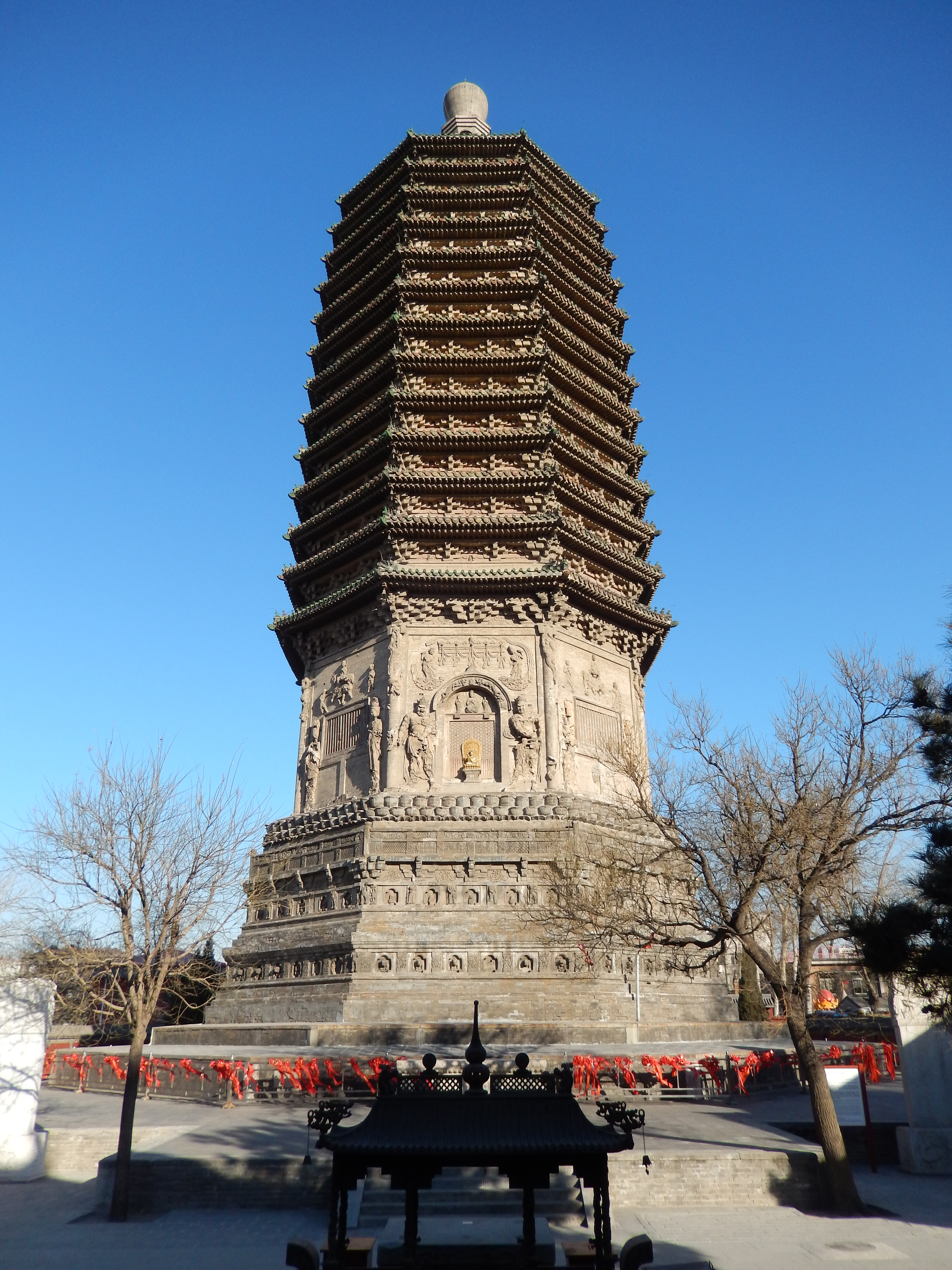
The Tianning Pagoda in Beijing, built around 1120.

- Badachu
- Bailin Temple (Beijing)
- Big Bell Temple (or Juesheng Temple)
- Cheng'en Temple
- Cloud Platform at Juyongguan
- Dahui Temple
- Dajue Temple
- Dule Temple
- Fahai Temple
- Fayuan Temple
- Guanghua Temple (Beijing)
- Guangji Temple (Beijing)
- Hongluo Temple
- Jietai Temple
- Lingguang Temple (Beijing)
- Miaoying Temple
- Pagoda of Tianning Temple
- Tanzhe Temple
- Temple of Azure Clouds
- Tianning Temple (Beijing)
- Tongjiao Temple
- Wanshou Temple
- Wofo Temple
- Xifeng Temple
- Xihuang Temple
- Yonghe Temple
- Yunju Temple
- Zhenjue Temple
- Zhihua Temple

== Chongqing ==
- Ciyun Temple (Chongqing)
- Luohan Temple (Chongqing)
- Shuanggui Temple

== Fujian ==
- Chengtian Temple (Quanzhou)
- Chongsheng Temple (Fujian)
- Cishou Temple
- Dizang Temple (Fuzhou)
- Guanghua Temple (Putian)
- Guangxiao Temple (Putian)
- Hualin Temple (Fuzhou)
- Huayan Temple (Ningde)
- Jinshan Temple (Fujian)
- Kaiyuan Temple (Quanzhou)
- Linyang Temple
- Longshan Temple (Jinjiang)
- Nanshan Temple
- Pagoda of Cishou Temple
- South Putuo Temple
- Wanfu Temple
- Xichan Temple (Fujian)
- Yongquan Temple (Fuzhou)

== Gansu ==
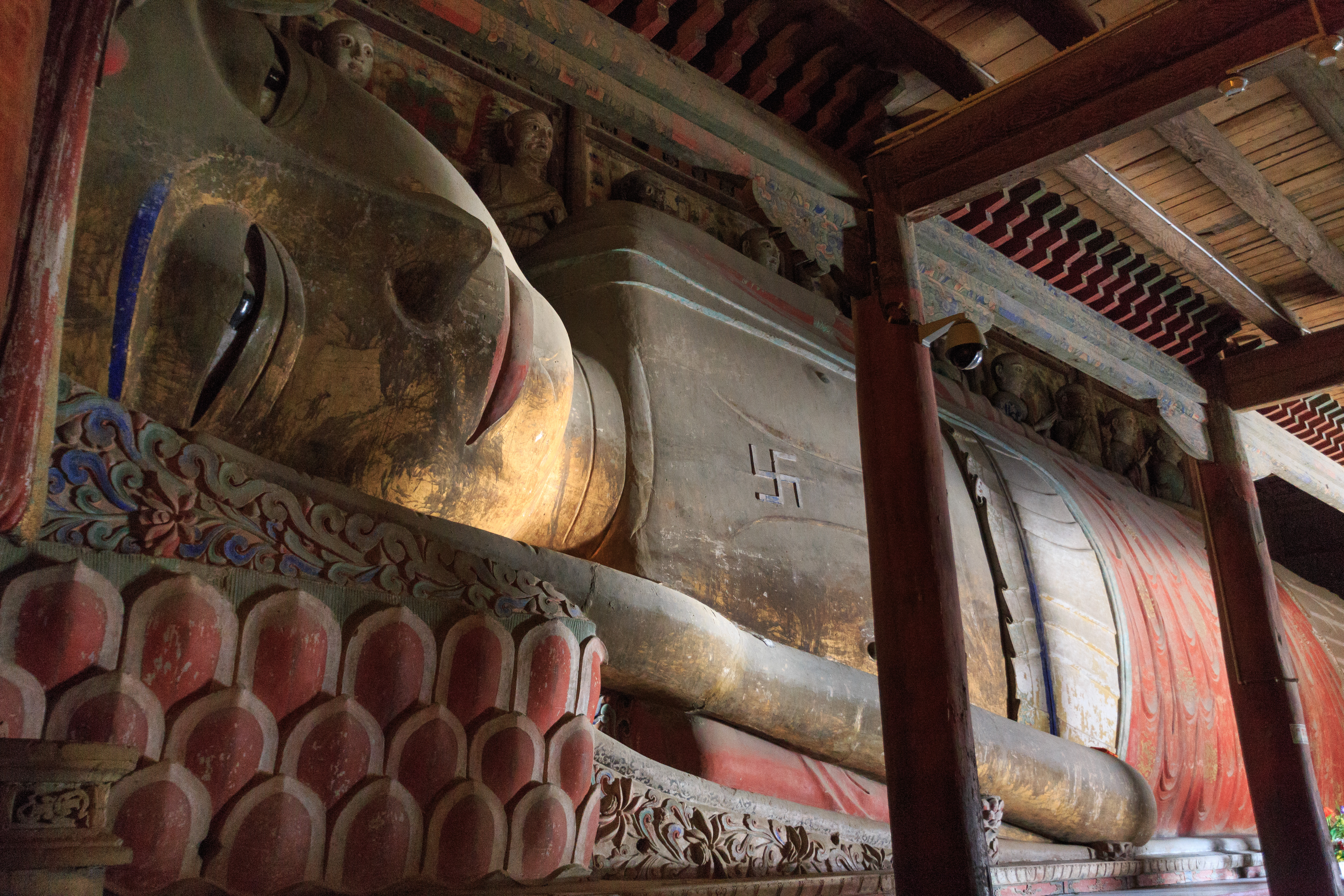
35 meter (115 ft) long statue of a reclining Buddha, made during the 12th-13th century, in Dafo Temple in Gansu

- Dafo Temple (Zhangye)
- Ta'er Temple (Suoyang City)
- White Horse Pagoda, Dunhuang

== Guangdong ==
- Guangxiao Temple (Guangzhou)
- Hoi Tong Monastery
- Kaiyuan Temple (Chaozhou)
- Lingshan Temple (Shantou)
- Nanhua Temple
- Qingyun Temple (Guangdong)
- Temple of the Six Banyan Trees
- Yunmen Temple (Guangdong)

== Guizhou ==
- Hongfu Temple (Guiyang)
- Qianming Temple

== Hainan ==
- Nanshan Temple (Sanya)

== Hebei ==
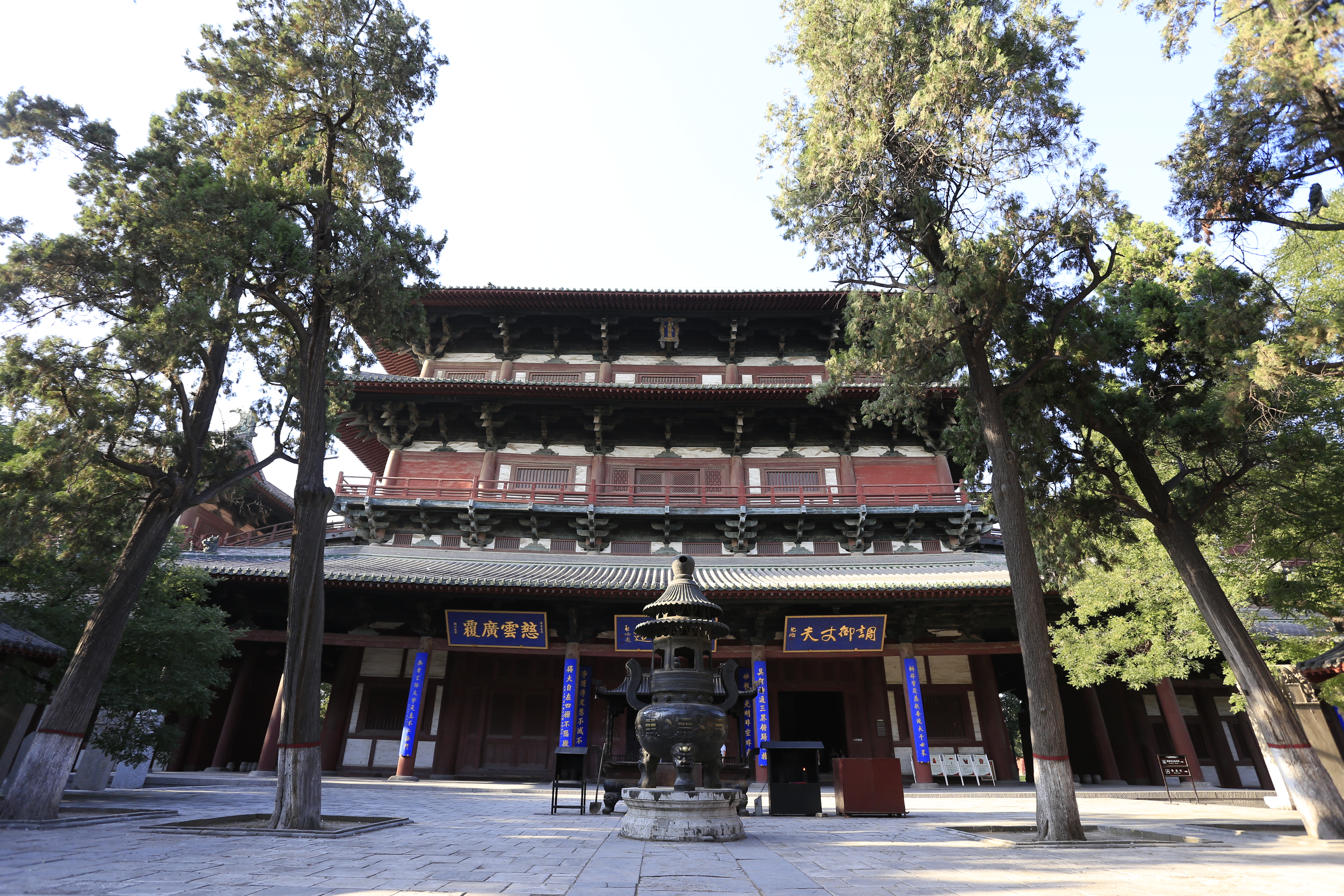
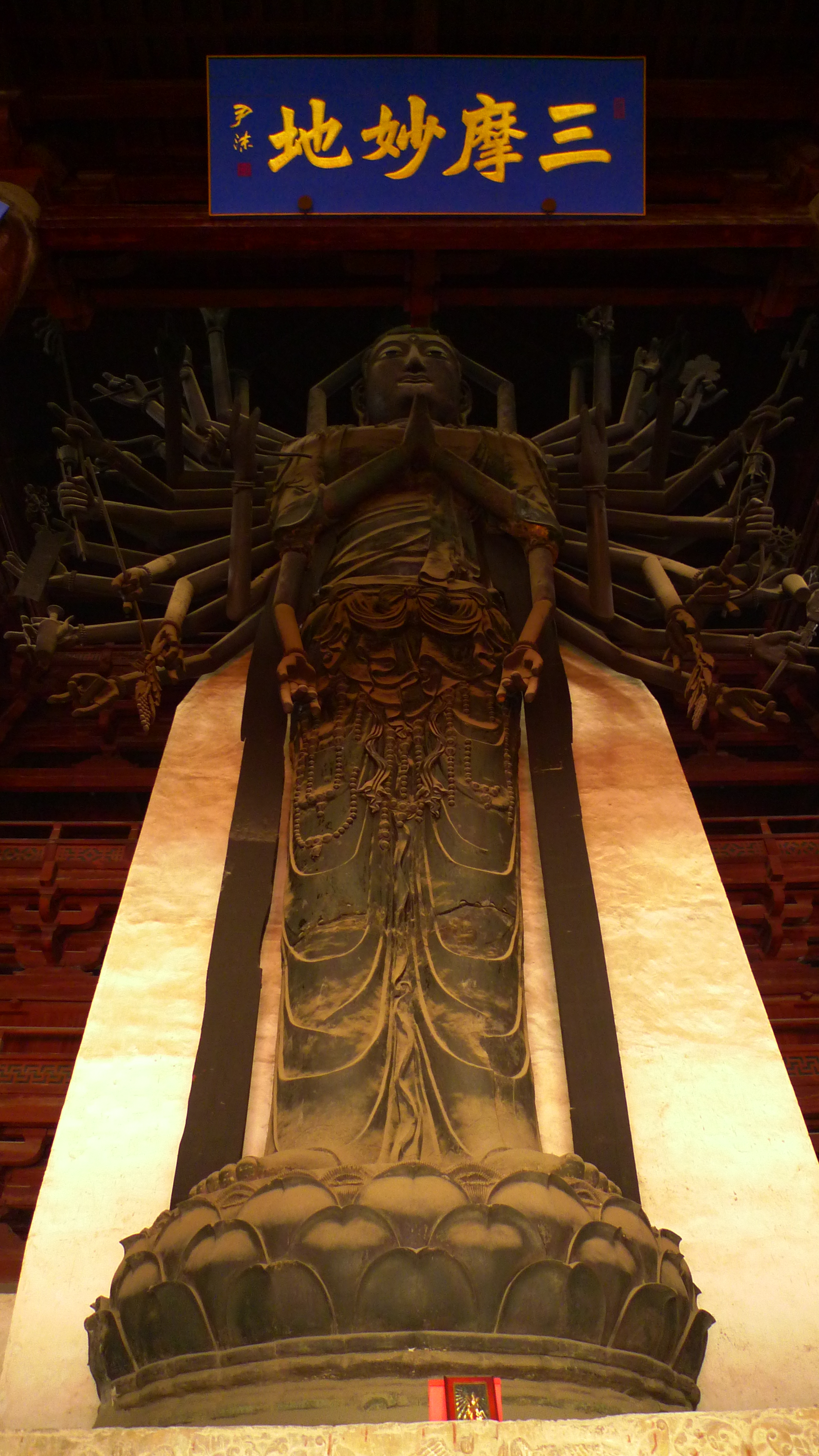
The Tower of Great Mercy in Longxing Temple in Hebei, as well as the 21.3 metres (70 ft) tall statue of the Thousand-Armed Thousand-Eyed Guanyin (Chinese: 千手千眼觀音; pinyin: Qiānshǒu Qiānyǎn Guānyīn) enshrined within it, which was cast in the year 971 AD during the Song dynasty
- Geyuan Temple
- Kaishan Temple
- Liaodi Pagoda
- Lingxiao Pagoda
- Linji Temple
- Longxing Monastery
- Pagoda of Bailin Temple
- Puning Temple (Hebei)
- Putuo Zongcheng Temple
- Xumi Pagoda
- Guanghui Temple Huatai Pagoda

== Henan ==
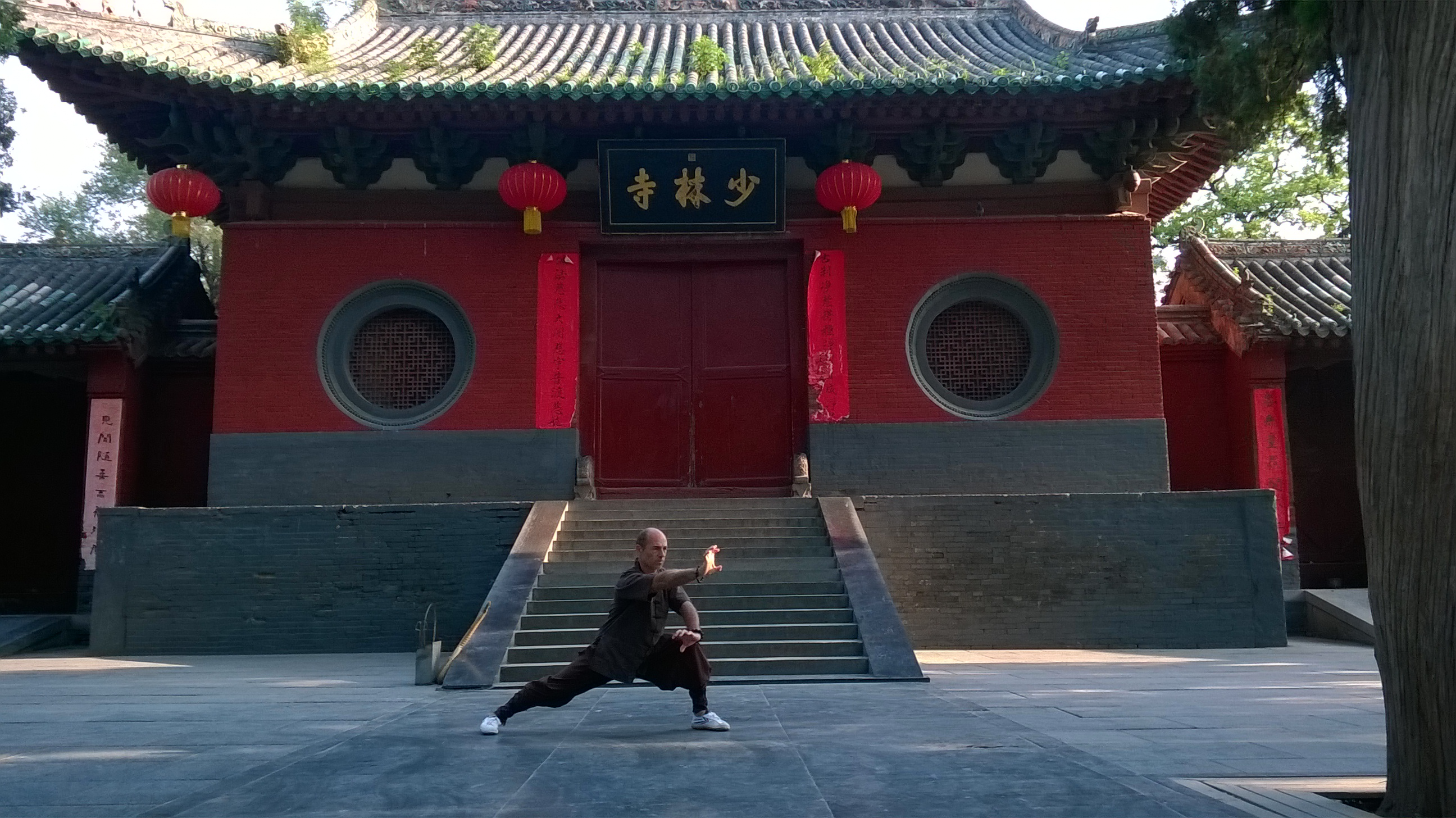
A monk practicing Shaolin Kung Fu in front of a hall in the Shaolin Monastery in Henan

- Daxingguo Temple
- Fawang Temple
- Iron Pagoda
- Jidu Temple
- Jinshan Temple (Hebi)
- Pagoda Forest at Shaolin Temple
- Qizu Pagoda
- Shaolin Monastery
- Songyue Pagoda
- White Horse Temple
- Xiangyan Temple
- Youguo Temple

== Hong Kong ==
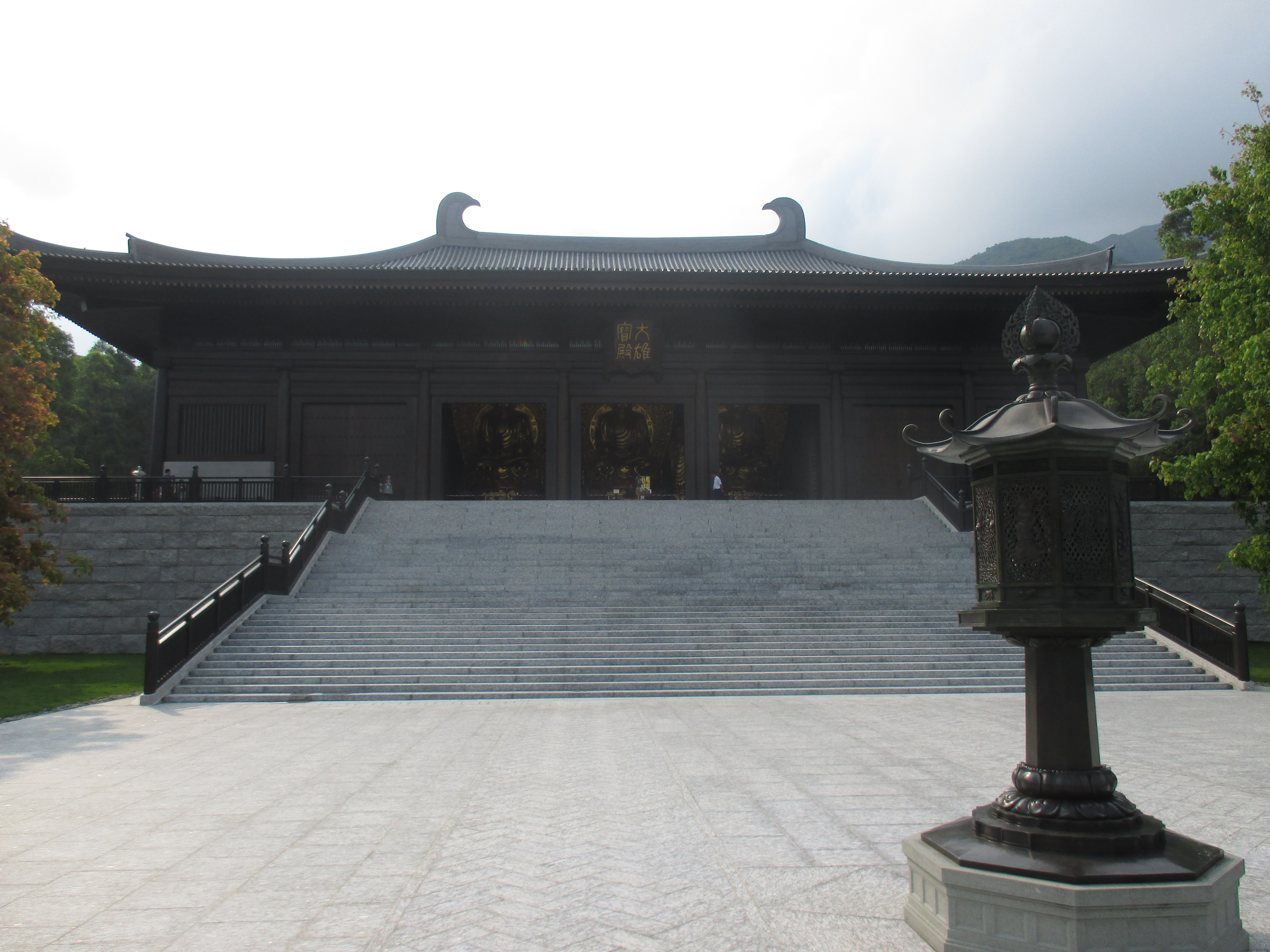
Mahavira Hall of Tsz Shan Monastery

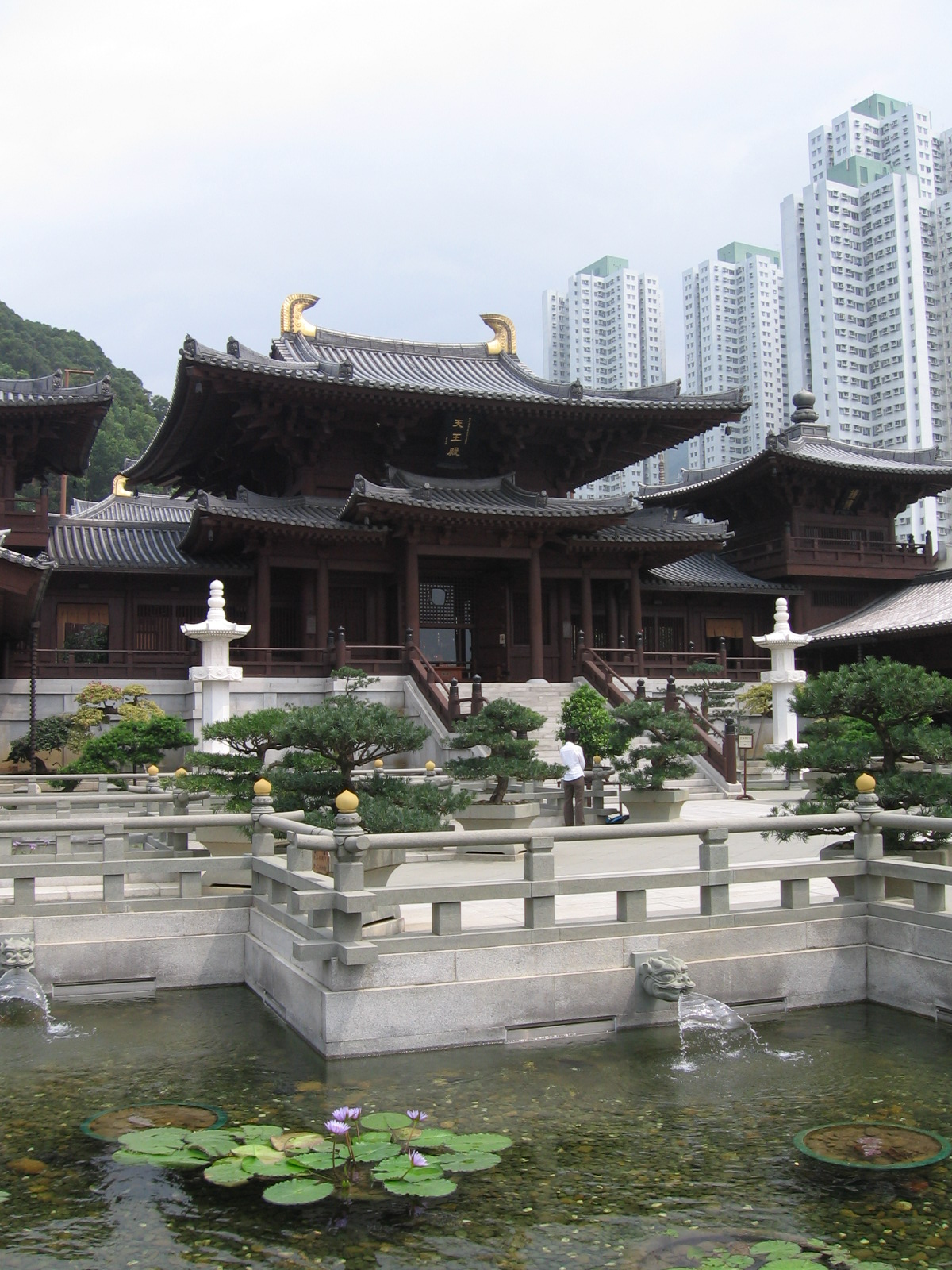
Chi Lin Nunnery in Kowloon, Hong Kong.

- Cham Shan Monastery (湛山寺), Clear Water Bay Peninsula
- Chi Lin Nunnery (志蓮淨苑), Diamond Hill, Kowloon
- Ling To Monastery (靈渡寺), Ha Tsuen, Yuen Long District
- Miu Fat Buddhist Monastery (妙法寺), Lam Tei, Tuen Mun District
- Po Lin Monastery (寶蓮禪寺), Lantau Island
- Ten Thousand Buddhas Monastery (萬佛寺), Sha Tin[1]
- Tsing Shan Monastery (青山禪院) (also called Piu To Temple), Tuen Mun
- Tsz Shan Monastery (慈山寺), Tung Tsz, Tai Po District
- Tung Lin Kok Yuen (東蓮覺苑), Happy Valley
- Tung Po Tor Monastery (東普陀講寺), Lo Wai, Tsuen Wan District

== Hubei ==
- Guiyuan Temple
- Baotong Temple
- Wuying Pagoda
- Wuzu Temple

== Hunan ==
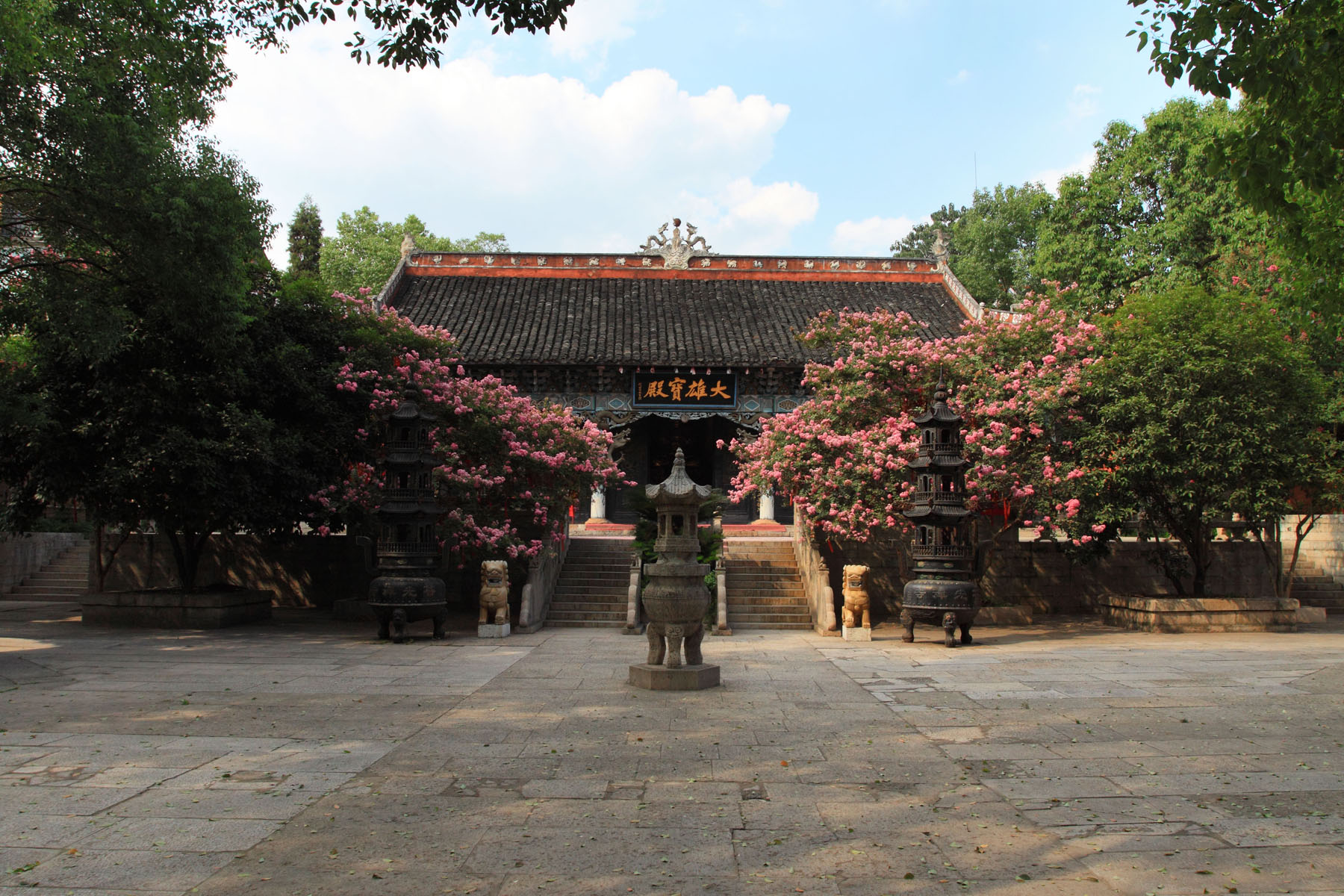
Mahavira Hall in Puguang Temple in Hunan

- Baiyun Temple (Ningxiang)
- Fuyan Temple
- Grand Temple of Mount Heng
- Guangji Temple (Hunan)
- Kaifu Temple
- Lingsheng Temple
- Lushan Temple
- Miyin Temple
- Nantai Temple
- Puguang Temple (Zhangjiajie)
- Puji Temple (Ningxiang)
- Shangfeng Temple
- Shishuang Temple
- Yunmen Temple (Hunan)
- Zhaoshan Temple
- Zhusheng Temple (Hunan)

== Inner Mongolia ==
- Five Pagoda Temple (Hohhot)

== Jiangsu ==
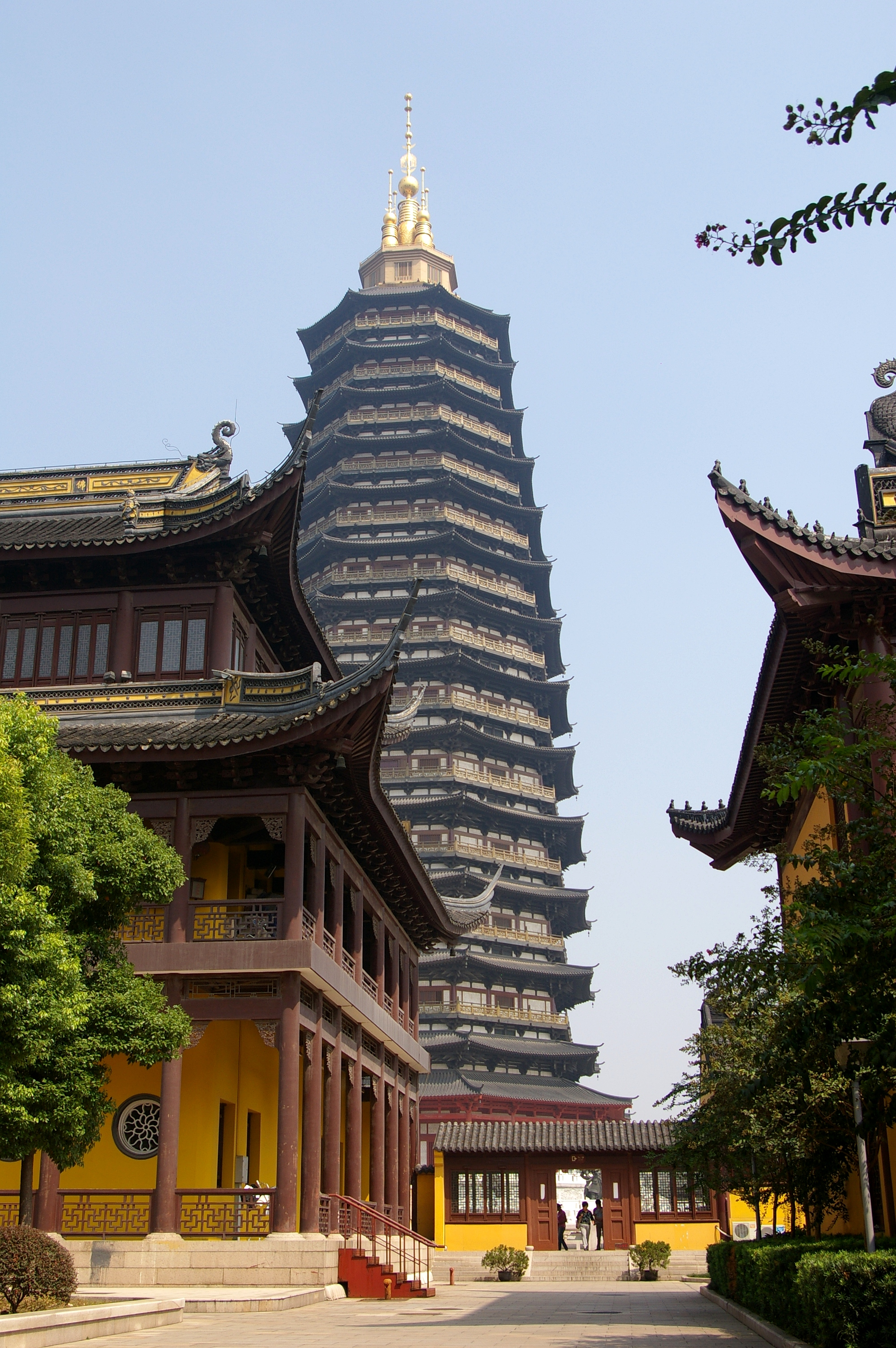
Tianning Temple (Changzhou) in Jiangsu, the tallest pagoda and tallest wooden structure in the world.

- Chongshan Temple
- Daming Temple, Yangzhou
- Dinghui Temple
- Gaomin Temple
- Guangjiao Temple, Nantong
- Hanshan Temple
- Huiji Temple, Nanjing
- Huqiu Tower
- Jiming Temple
- Jinshan Temple, Zhenjiang
- Lianxing Temple, Yangzhou
- Linggu Temple
- Lingshan Buddhist Temple
- Lingyanshan Temple
- Longchang Temple
- Qixia Temple
- Tianning Temple, Changzhou, with the tallest pagoda in the world
- Tiger Hill Pagoda, Suzhou
- Xingfu Temple, Changshu
- Xiyuan Temple
- Yunyan Temple, Suzhou

== Jiangxi ==
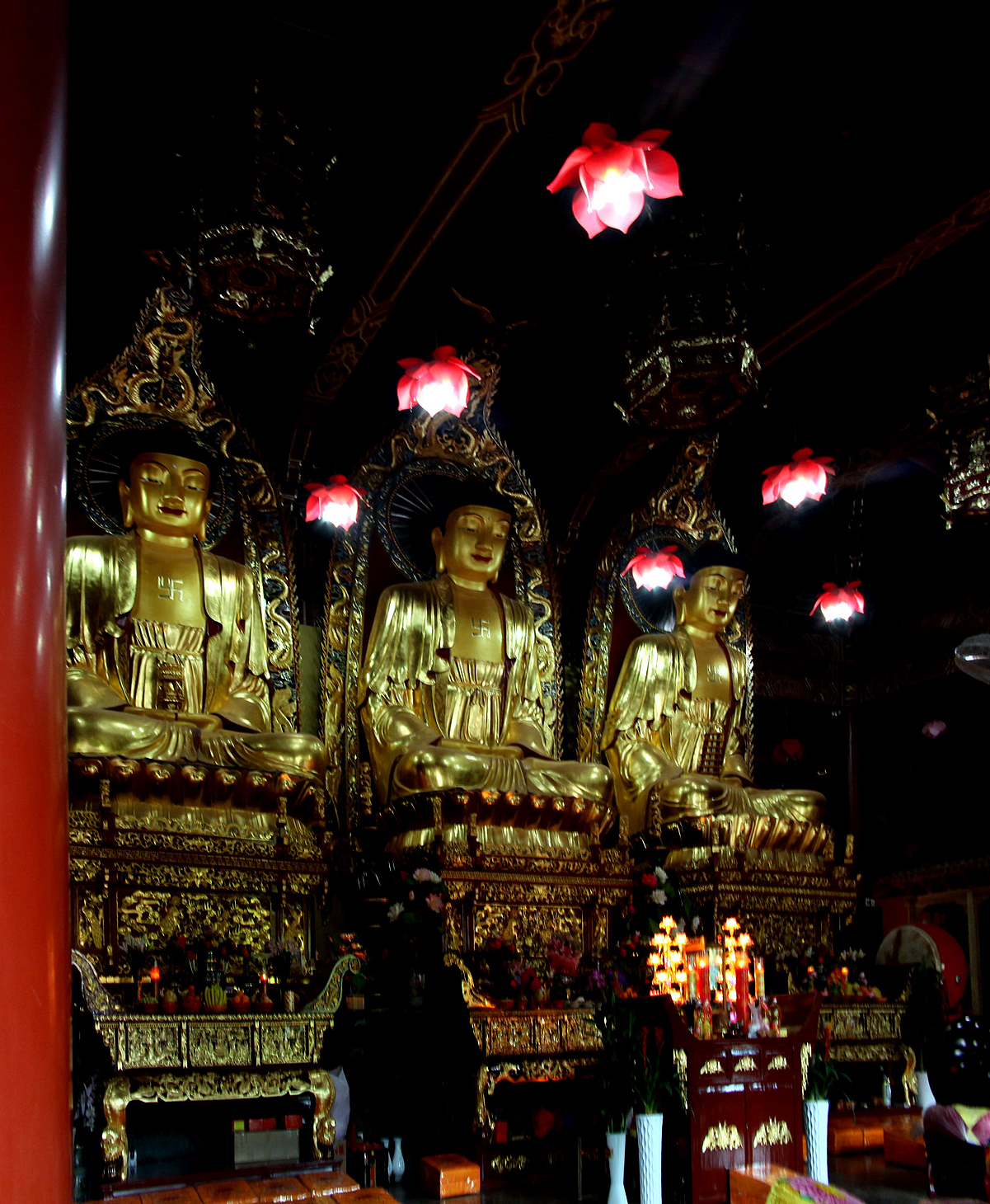
Statues of Amitabha (left), Gautama Buddha (center), and Bhaisajyaguru (right) in Donglin Temple in Jiangxi

- Donglin Temple
- Jingju Temple (Ji'an)
- Nengren Temple (Jiujiang)
- Puning Temple (Jiangxi)
- Zhenru Temple (Jiangxi)

== Jilin ==
- Banruo Temple (Changchun)
- Dizang Temple (Changchun)
- Guanyin Ancient Temple

== Liaoning ==
- Banruo Temple (Shenyang)
- Ci'en Temple (Liaoning)
- Fengguo Temple
- Zhiyuan Temple (Panjin)

== Macau ==
- Kun Iam Temple, (also known as Pou Chai Temple, Chinese: 普濟禪院)

== Ningxia ==
- Baisigou Square Pagoda
- Haibao Pagoda Temple
- Hongfo Pagoda
- One Hundred and Eight Stupas
- Pagoda of Chengtian Temple

== Shaanxi ==
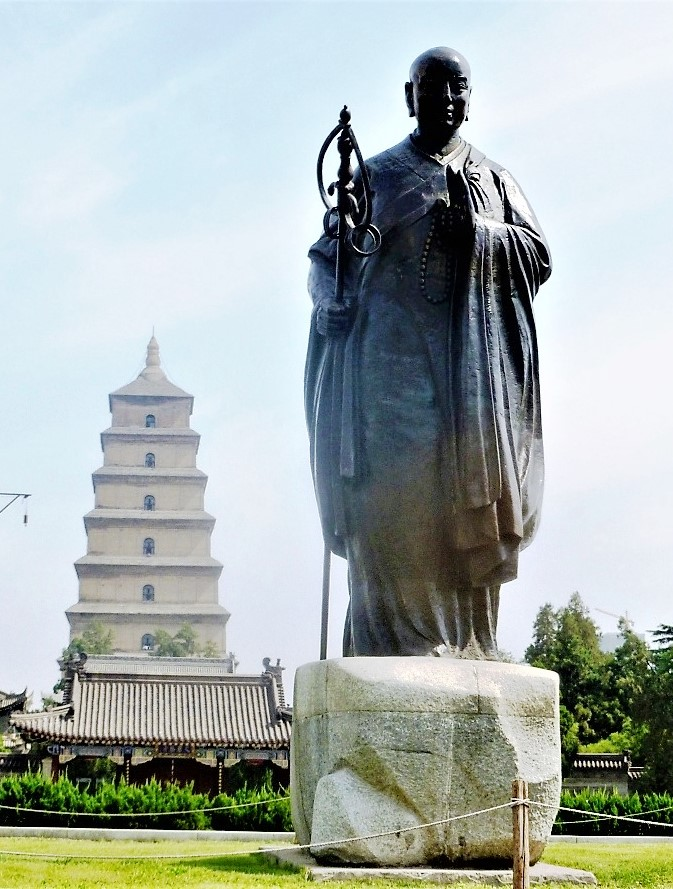
Statue of Xuanzang in front of the Giant Wild Goose Pagoda in Shaanxi

- Caotang Temple
- Daci'en Temple
- Daxingshan Temple
- Famen Temple
- Giant Wild Goose Pagoda
- Guangren Temple
- Jianfu Temple
- Jingye Temple
- Qinglong Temple (Xi'an)
- Small Wild Goose Pagoda
- Wolong Temple
- Xiangji Temple (Shaanxi)
- Xingjiao Temple

== Shandong ==
- Four-gates pagoda
- Lingyan Temple (Jinan)
- Pizhi Pagoda
- Xingguo Temple (Jinan)
- Zhanshan Temple (Shandong)

== Shanghai ==
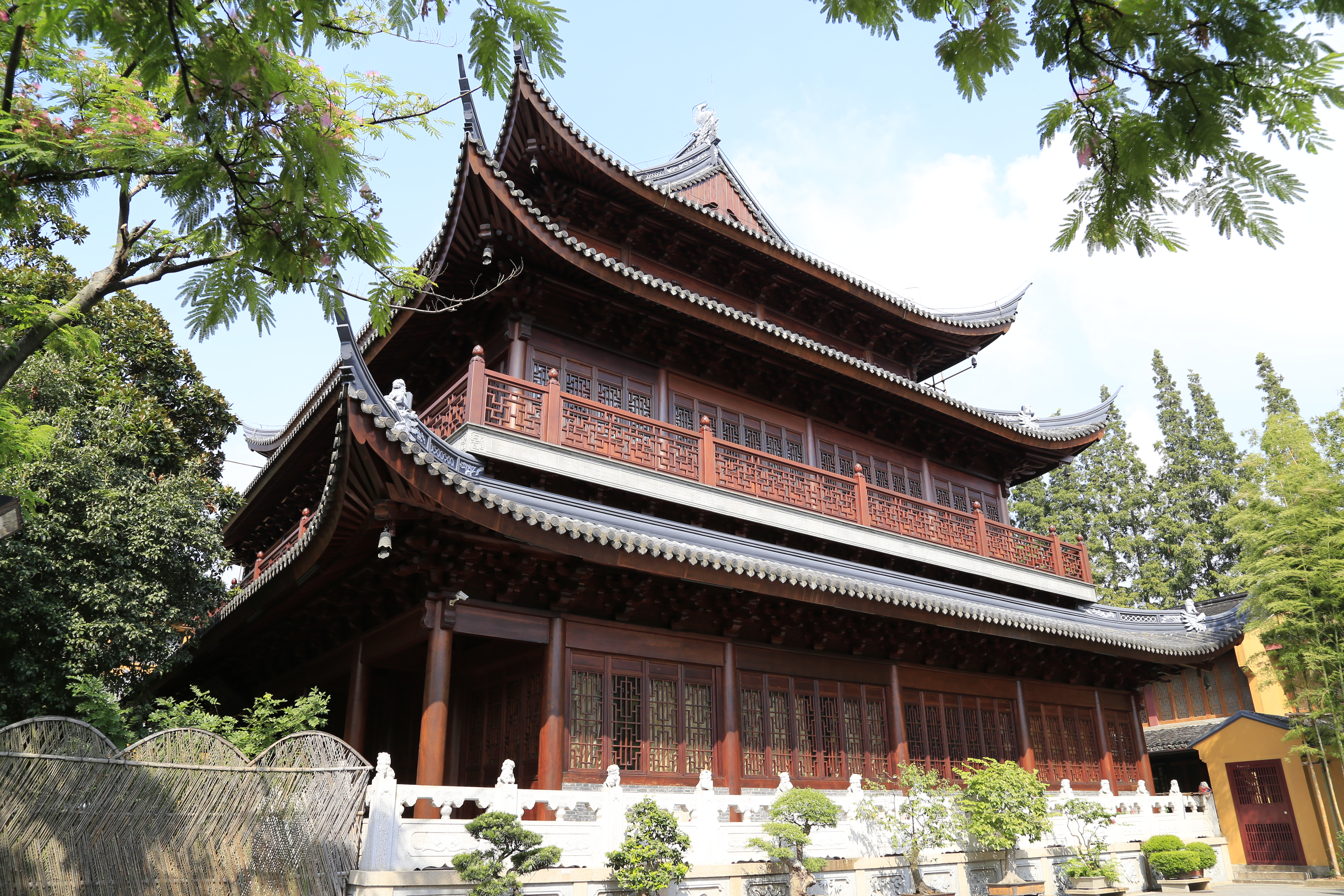
A hall in Longhua Temple (Shanghai)

- Baoshan Temple
- Chenxiang Pavilion
- Donglin Temple (Shanghai)
- Hongfu Temple (Shanghai)
- Jade Buddha Temple
- Jing'an Temple
- Longhua Temple
- Yuanming Jiangtang
- Zhenru Temple (Shanghai)

== Shanxi ==
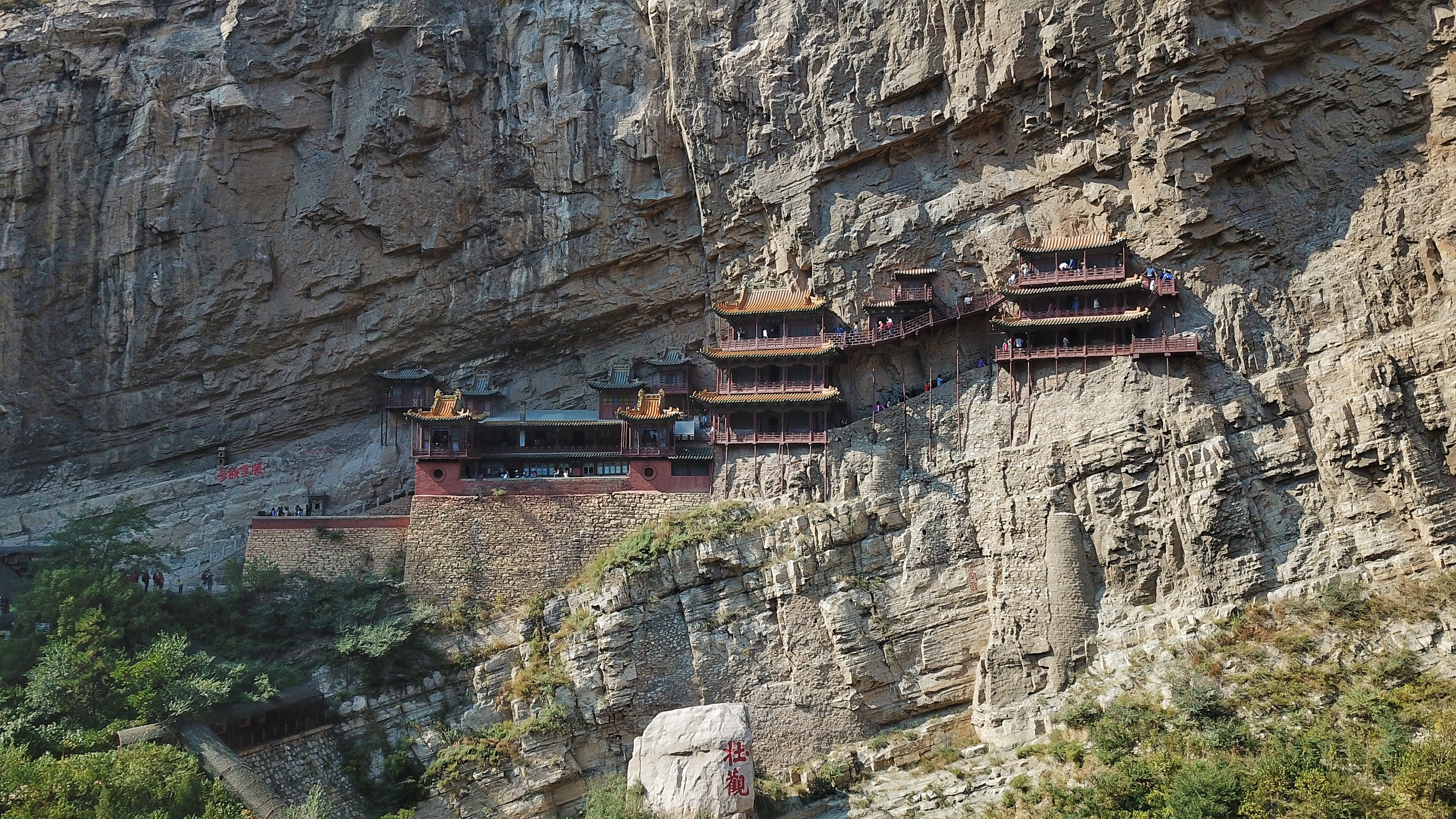
The Hanging Temple, a temple built into a cliff 75 meters (246 ft) above the ground near Mount Heng in Shanxi in 491 AD

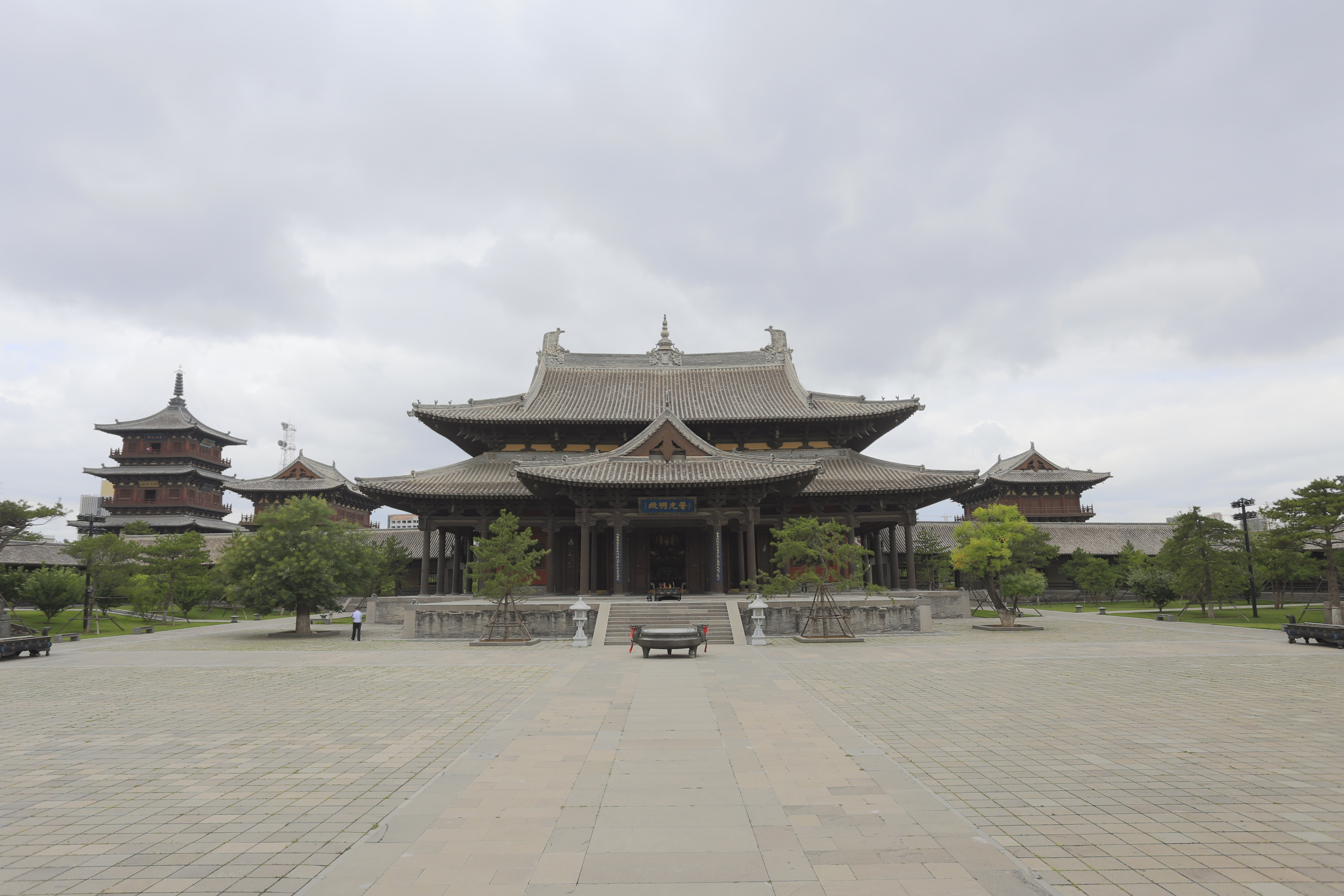
A hall and courtyard at Huayan Temple in Shanxi

- Chongshan Temple (Shanxi)
- Huayan Temple (Datong)
- Pagoda of Fogong Temple
- Puhua Temple
- Qifo Temple
- Shuanglin Temple
- The Hanging Temple
- Xuanzhong Temple
- Yanqing Temple
- Yuanzhao Temple
- Zhenguo Temple

=== Mount Wutai ===
- Bishan Temple
- Dailuoding
- Foguang Temple
- Great White Pagoda
- Guangzong Temple (Mount Wutai)
- Gufo Temple
- Jile Temple
- Jinge Temple
- Longhua Temple
- Mimi Temple
- Nanchan Temple
- Puhua Temple
- Pusading
- Qixian Temple (Mount Wutai)
- Shifang Temple
- Shuxiang Temple
- Tayuan Temple
- Wenshu Temple (Mount Wutai)
- Xiantong Temple
- Yanshan Temple
- Youguo Temple
- Zunsheng Temple

== Sichuan ==
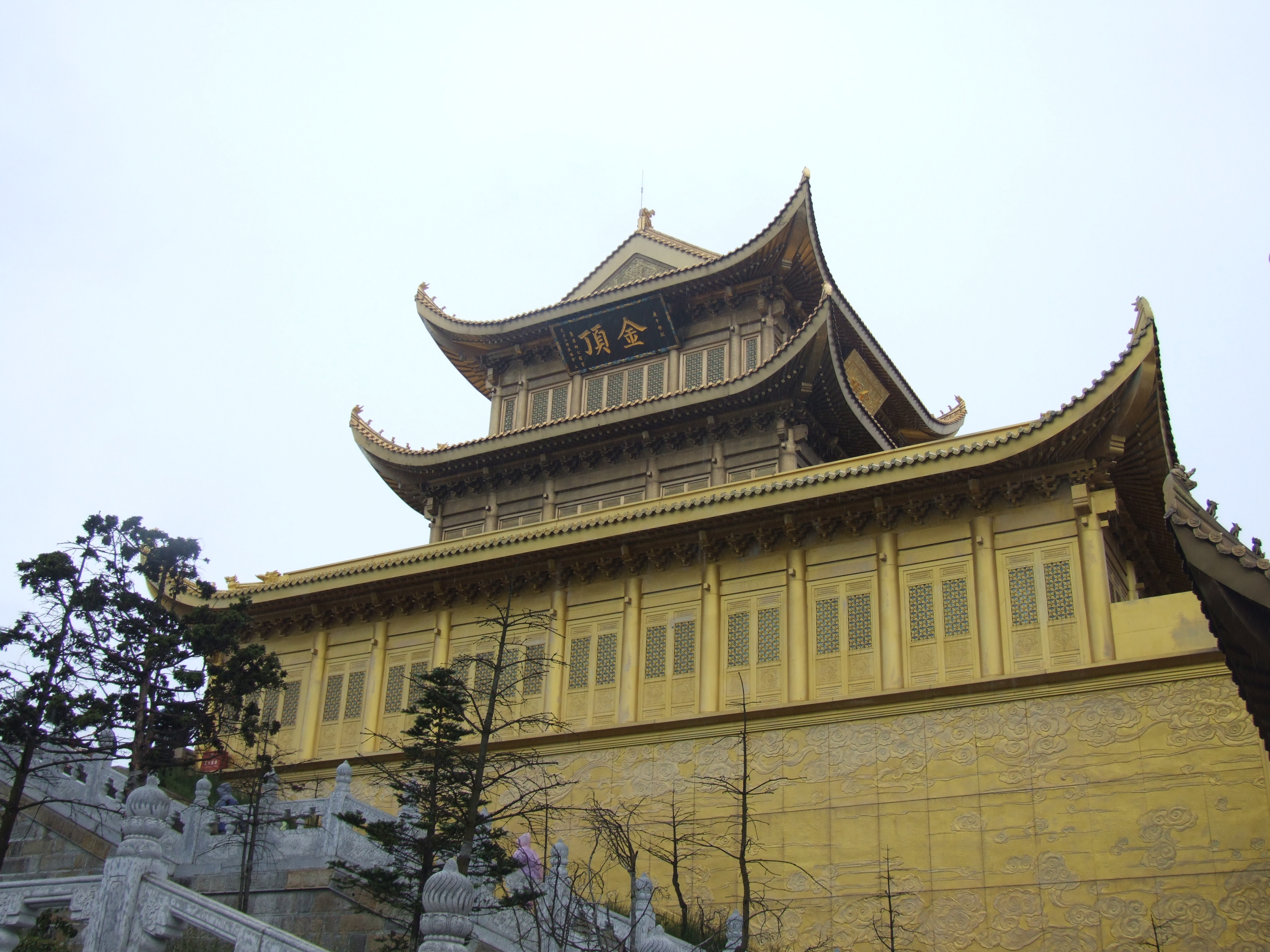
Huazang Temple (or Jinding; lit. "Golden Summit") at the summit of Mount Emei, in Sichuan. Mount Emei is one of the Four Sacred Mountains of Chinese Buddhism.

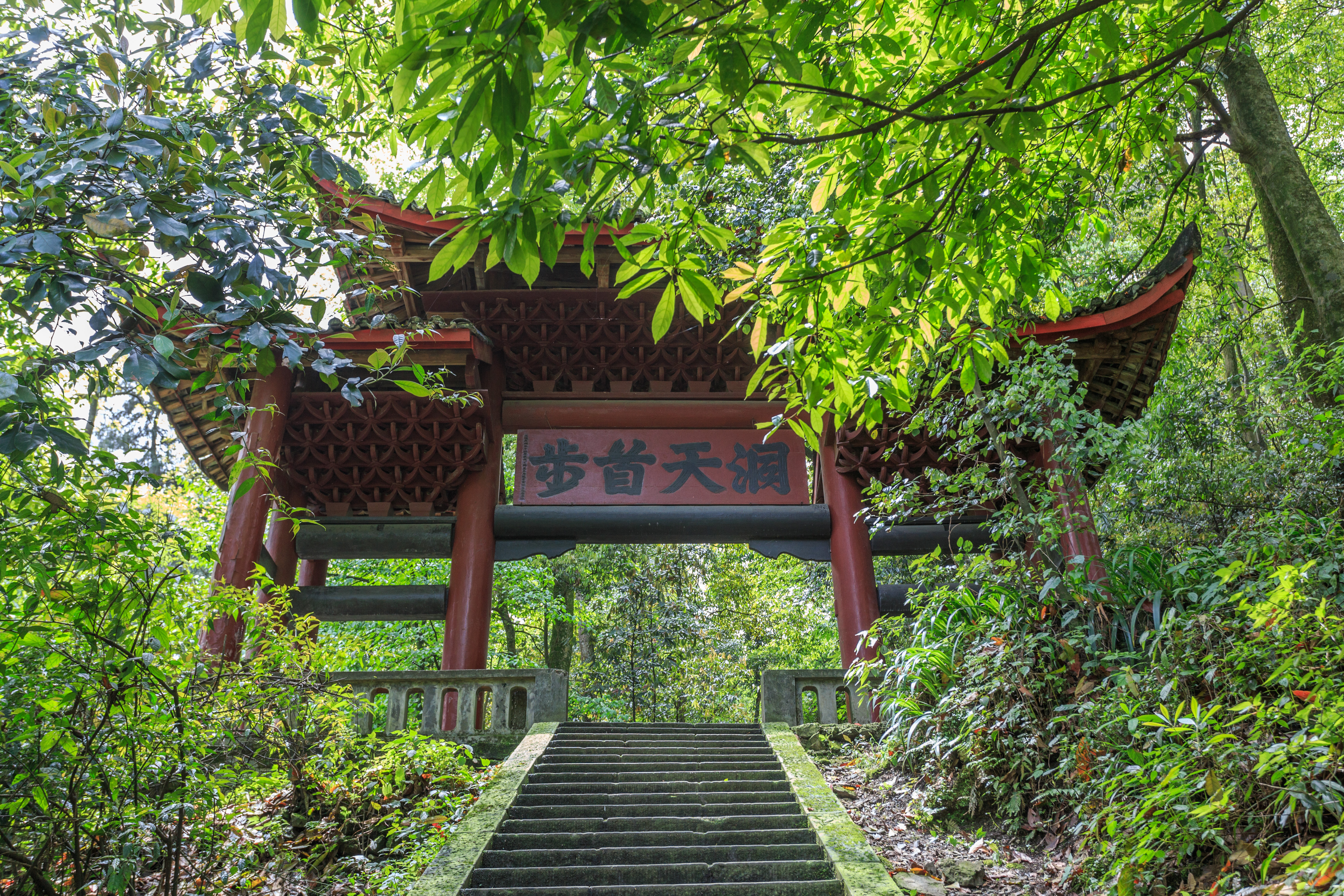
A paifang at the entrance of Hongchunping Temple

- Bao'en Temple (Pingwu)
- Baoguang Temple
- Luohan Temple (Shifang)
- Qiongzhu Temple
- Wenshu Temple (Chengdu)
- Wuyou Temple
- Zhaojue Temple

=== Mount Emei ===
- Baoguo Temple (Mount Emei)
- Hongchunping Temple
- Huazang Temple
- Wannian Temple
- Xixiang Chi

== Tianjin ==
- Guangji Temple (Tianjin)
- Temple of Great Compassion

== Yunnan ==
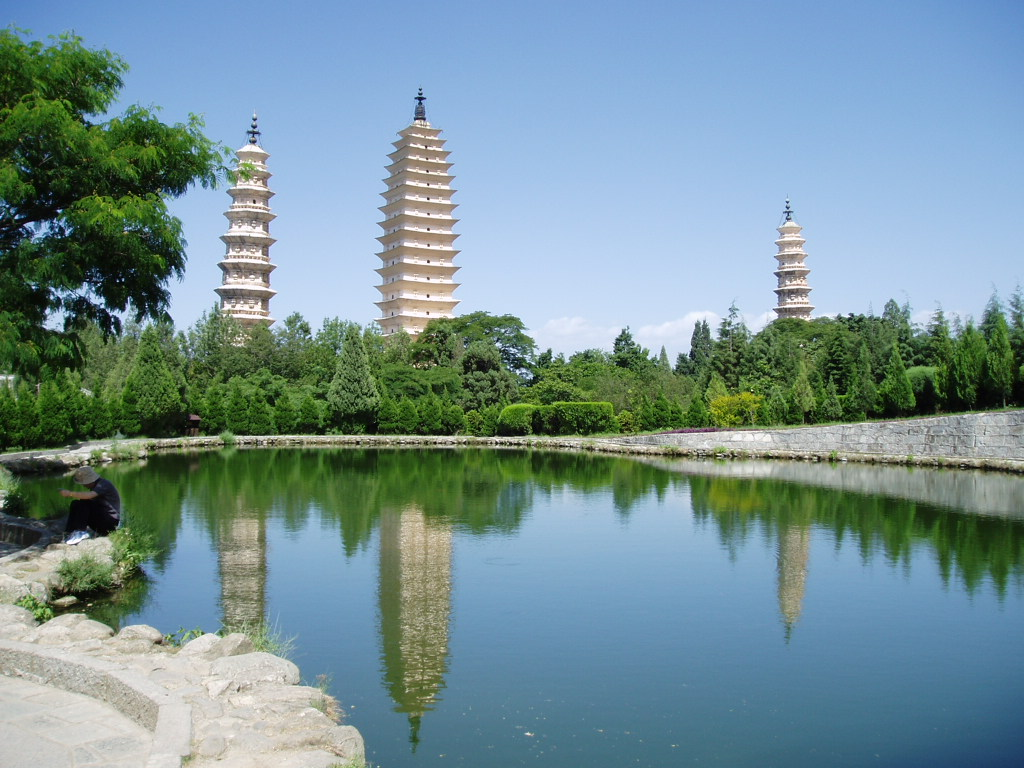
The Three Pagodas of Chong Sheng Temple, Dali City, Yunnan, dating to the 9th and 10th centuries.

- Chongshan Temple (Yunnan)
- Foguang Temple (Mangshi)
- Guangyun Temple
- Huating Temple
- Jinlong Temple
- Mange Temple
- Puti Temple
- Qiongzhu Temple
- Three Pagodas
- Tongwadian (Dali)
- Yuantong Temple
- Zhusheng Temple (Yunnan)

== Zhejiang ==
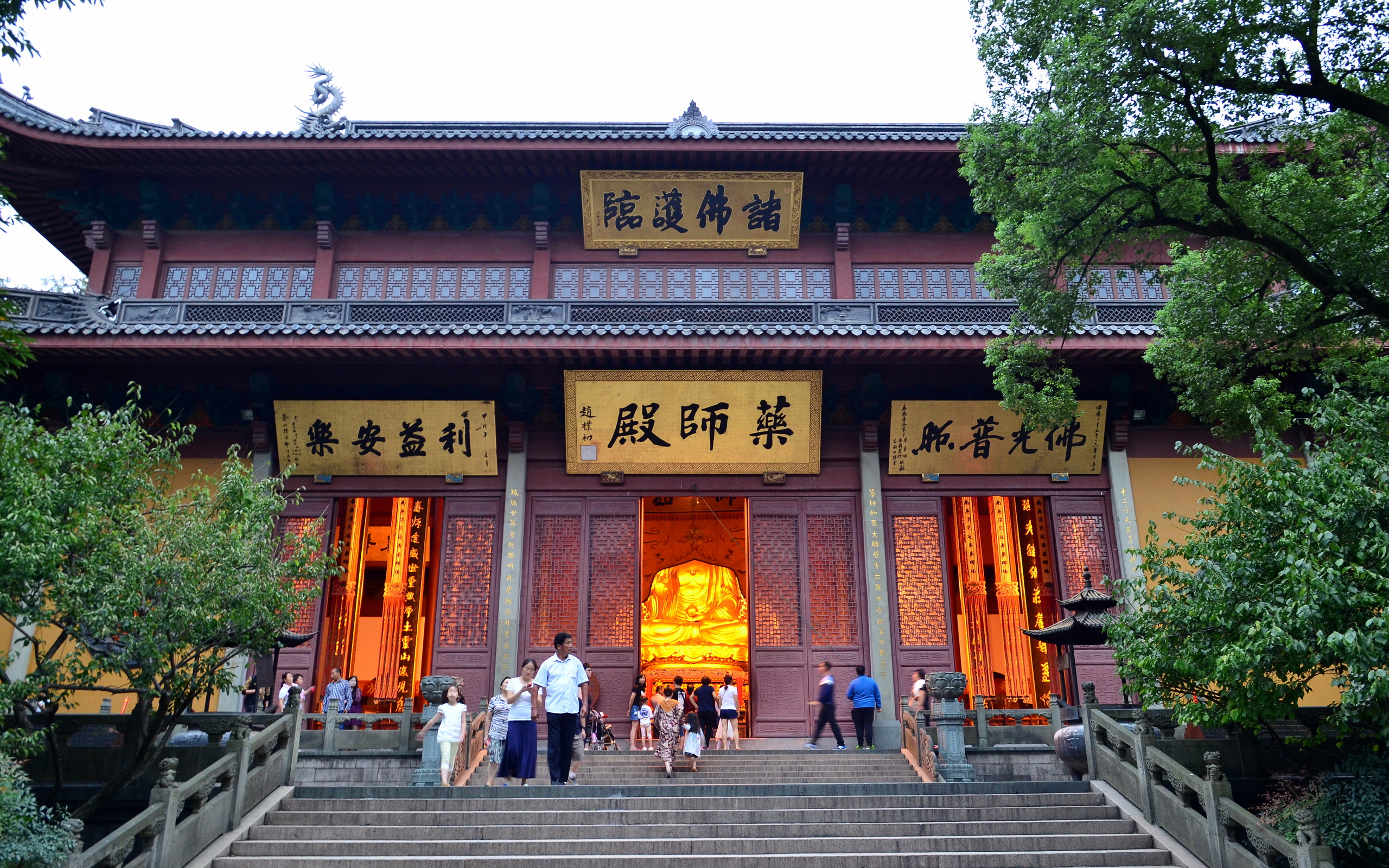
Hall of Bhaisajyaguru in Lingyin Temple in Zhejiang

- Baoguo Temple (Former temple)
- Dafo Temple
- Guoqing Temple
- Jingci Temple
- Jiangxin Temple
- Jingju Temple
- Lingyin Temple
- Liuhe Pagoda
- Mingjiao Temple
- Qita Temple
- Temple of King Ashoka
- Tiantong Temple
- Yanfu Temple (Wuyi County)

=== Mount Putuo ===
- Huiji Temple (Mount Putuo)
- Fayu Temple
- Puji Temple

== See also ==
- Buddhism in the People's Republic of China
- Chinese architecture
- Kyaung
- List of Buddhist architecture in China
- List of Buddhist temples
- National Key Buddhist Temples in Han Chinese Area
