= Hongfu Temple =

Hongfu Temple (Chinese: 洪福寺; pinyin: Hóngfú Sì) or (Chinese: 弘福寺; pinyin: Hóngfú Sì) may refer to:

- Hongfu Temple (Shanghai), in Fengxian District of Shanghai, China
- Hongfu Temple (Guiyang), in Guiyang, Guizhou, China
