= Jingye =

Jingye may refer to:

- Li Jingye, Chinese general and politician
- Jingye Group, Chinese steelmaker
- Jingye Temple, Buddhist temple, Shaanxi, China
- Xu Jingye (PRC), Chinese politician
