= Wenshu Temple =

Wenshu Temple (Chinese: 文殊寺; pinyin: Wénshū Sì or (Chinese: 文殊院; pinyin: Wénshū Yuàn), may refer to:

- Wenshu Temple (Sunan County), in Sunan County, Gansu, China
- Wenshu Temple (Pingdingshan), in Pingdingshan, Henan, China
- Wenshu Temple (Mount Wutai), on Mount Wutai, in Xinzhou, Shanxi, China
- Wenshu Temple (Shuozhou), in Shuozhou, Shanxi, China
- Wenshu Temple (Suzhou), in Suzhou, Jiangsu, China
- Wenshu Temple (Jiedong County), in Jiedong County, Guangdong, China
- Wenshu Temple (Chengdu), in Chengdu, Sichuan, China
