= Chongshan Temple =

Chongshan Temple (Chinese: 崇善寺; pinyin: Chóngshàn Sì), may refer to:

- Chongshan Temple (Shanxi), in Taiyuan, Shanxi, China
- Chongshan Temple (Jiangsu), in Yixing, Jiangsu, China
