= Luohan Temple =

Luohan Temple (simplified Chinese: 罗汉寺; traditional Chinese: 羅漢寺; pinyin: Luóhàn Sì), may refer to:

- Luohan Temple (Chongqing), in Yuzhong District of Chongqing, China
- Luohan Temple (Shifang), in Shifang, Sichuan, China
- Luohan Temple (Chengdu), in Chengdu, Sichuan, China
- Luohan Temple, in Suzhou, Jiangsu, China
- Luohan Temple (Henan), in Gongyi, Henan, China
