= Puguang Temple (Zhangjiajie) =

Buddhist temple in Zhangjiajie, Hunan, China

- 普光寺
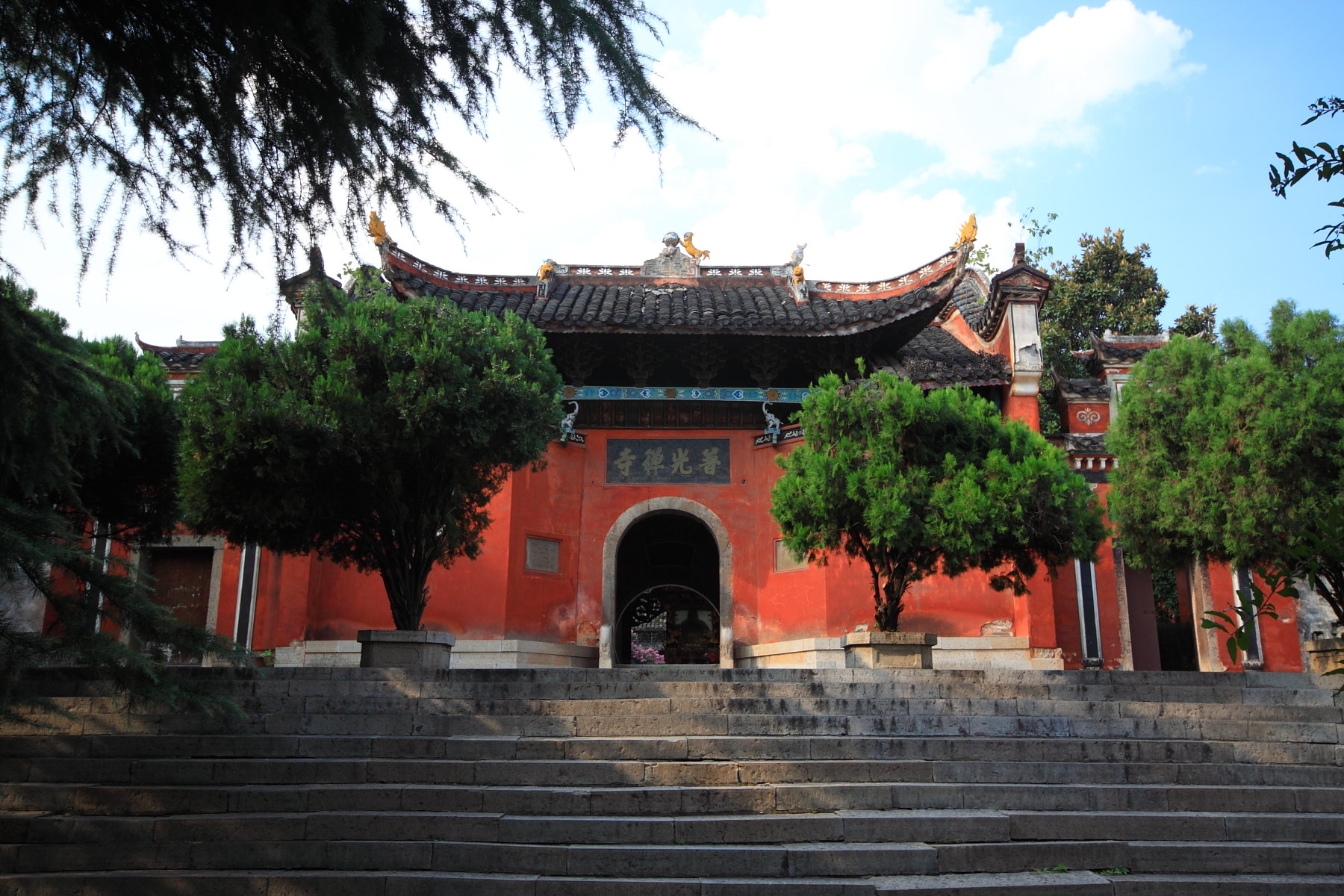

- Location within Hunan

Religion
- Affiliation: Buddhism
- Deity: Chan Buddhism–Linji school
- Leadership: Shi Yifei (释一飞); Shi Xinyi (释心仪)

Location
- Location: Yongding District, Zhangjiajie, Hunan
- Country: China
- Interactive map of Puguang Temple
- Coordinates: 29°07′40.08″N 110°28′59.88″E

Architecture
- Style: Chinese architecture
- Founder: Yong Jian (雍简)
- Established: 1413
- Completed: 1733 (reconstruction)

Puguang Temple (Chinese: 普光寺; pinyin: Pǔguāng Sì) or Puguang Chan Temple (simplified Chinese: 普光禅寺; traditional Chinese: 普光禪寺; pinyin: Pǔguāng Chánsì) is a Buddhist temple located in Yongding District of Zhangjiajie, Hunan, China.

== History ==
According to Hunan Yongding Records (湖南永定乡土志), the temple was first built by a military official Yong Jian (雍简) in 1413, under the Ming dynasty (1368–1644).

In 1733, in the reign of Yongzheng Emperor in the Qing dynasty (1644–1911), a local official named Shi Cheng renovated and refurbished the temple.

== Architecture ==
The extant structure is based on the Ming and Qing dynasties building principles and retains the traditional architectural style. The complex include the following halls: Shanmen, Mahavira Hall, Hall of Four Heavenly Kings, Hall of Guanyin, Bell tower, Drum tower, Hall of Arhats, Dharma Hall, Dining Room, etc.

=== Shanmen ===
Statues of Heng and Ha sitting on the seats before both sides of the Shanmen.

=== Mahavira Hall ===
Under the eaves is a plaque with the Chinese characters "Mahavira Hall" written by former Venerable Master of the Buddhist Association of China Zhao Puchu. It went through more than 10 rebuilds. The latest maintenance was in 1989. The Mahavira Hall enshrining the statues of Guanyin, Manjushri and Samantabhadra.

=== Hall of Arhats ===
The Hall of Arhats houses statues of lifelike Eighteen Arhats with different looks and manners.

=== Hall of Guanyin ===
A statue of Guanyin is enshrined in the Hall of Guanyin.

== Gallery ==
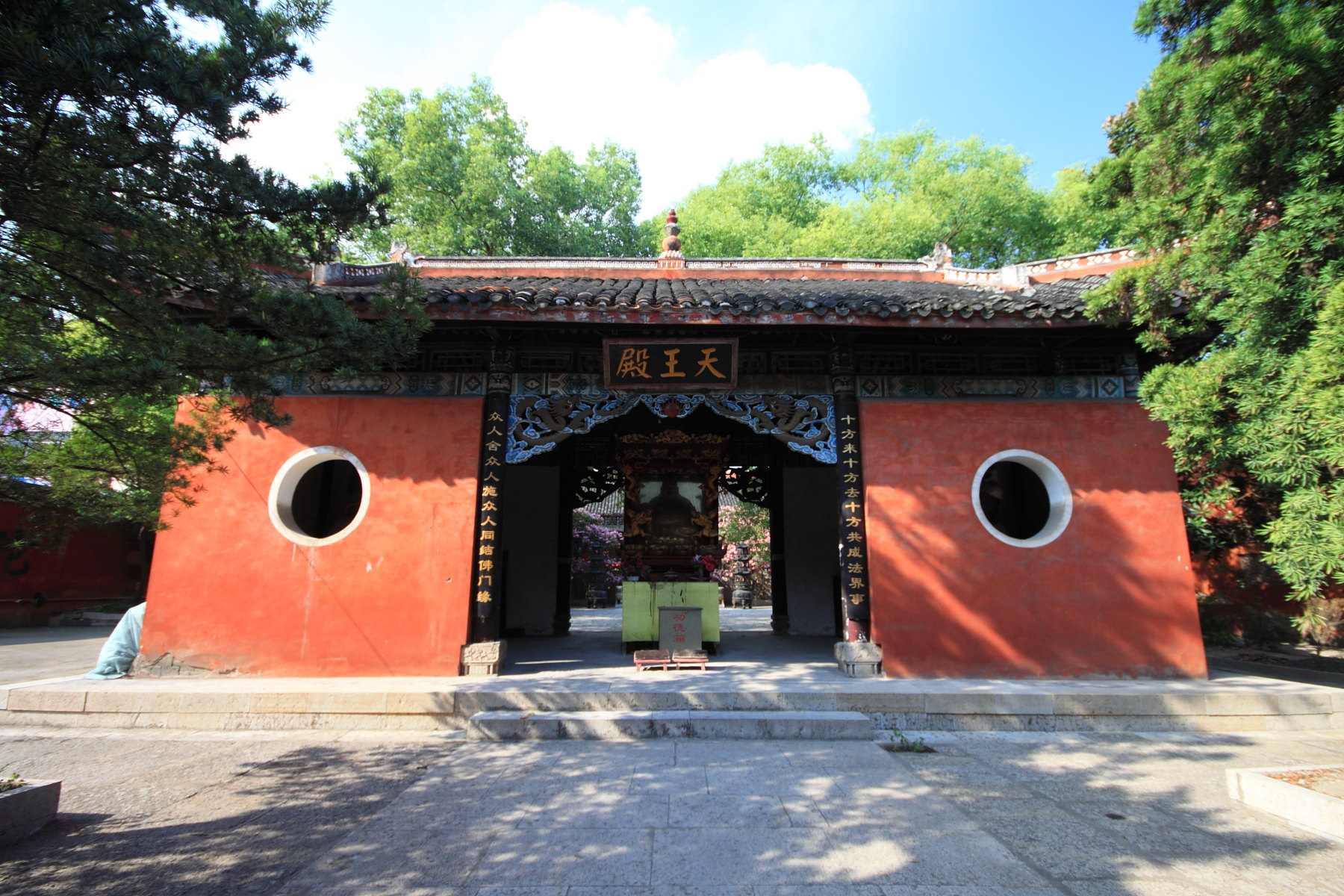
Hall of Four Heavenly Kings.

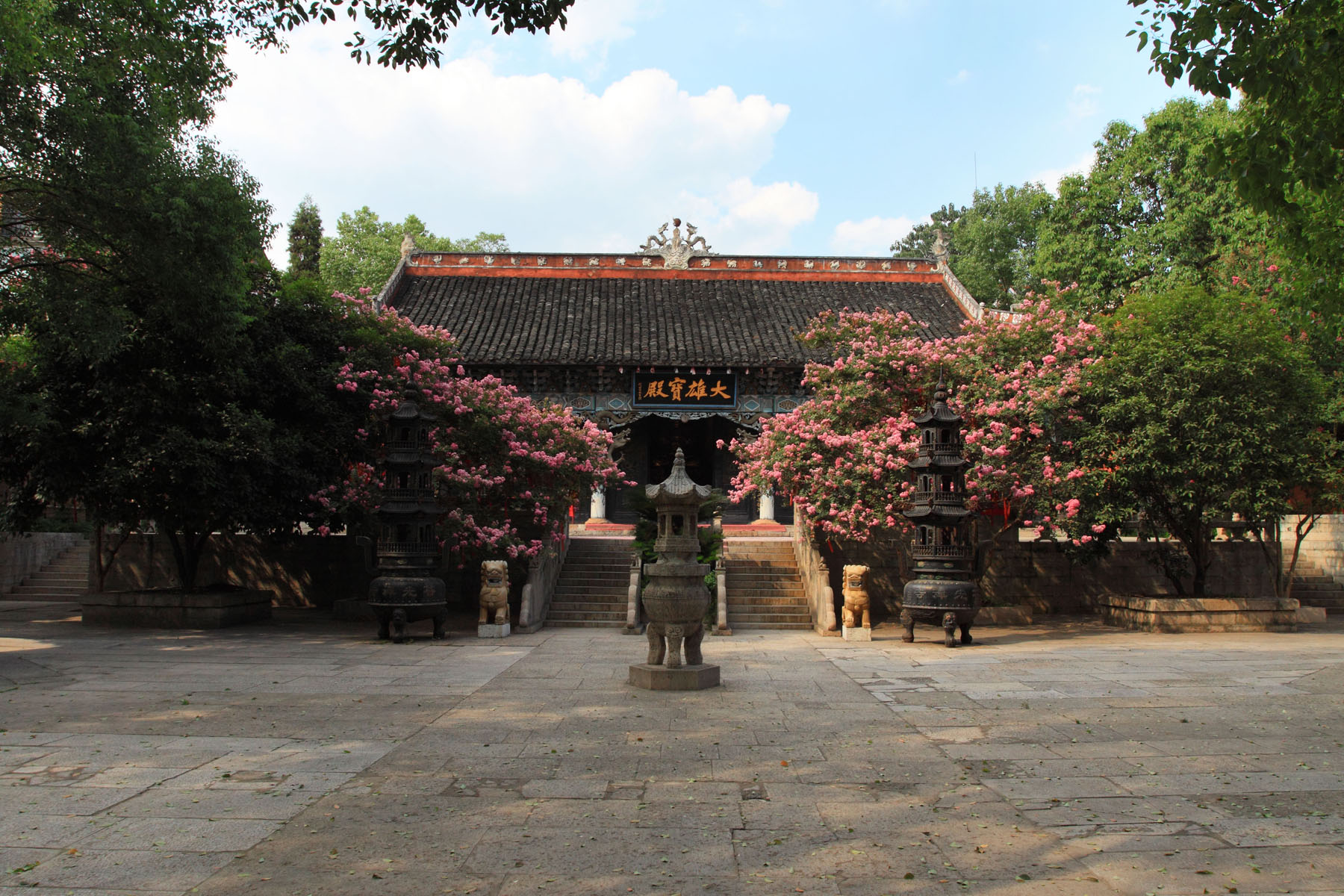
Mahavira Hall.

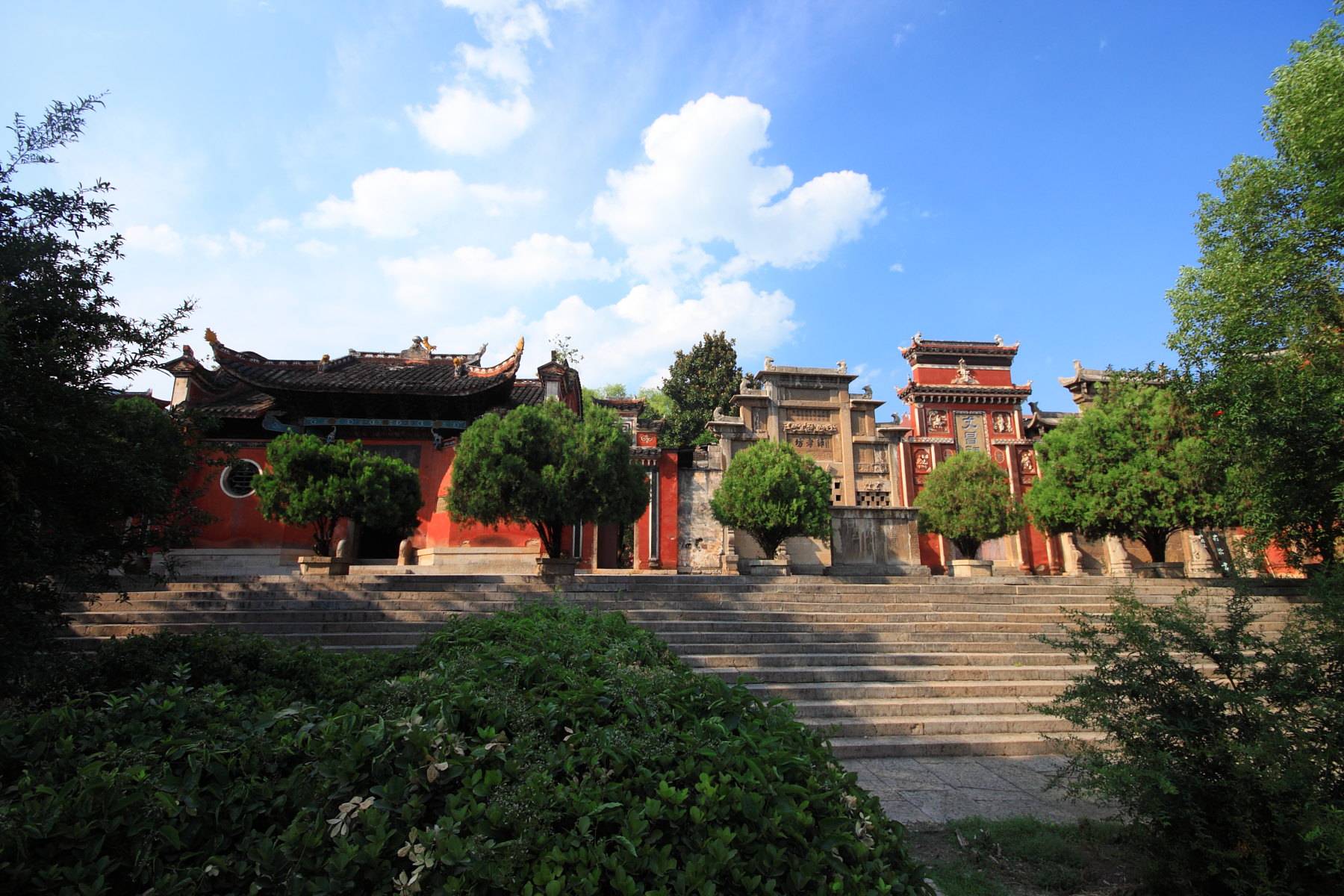
Frontal view of Puguang Temple.

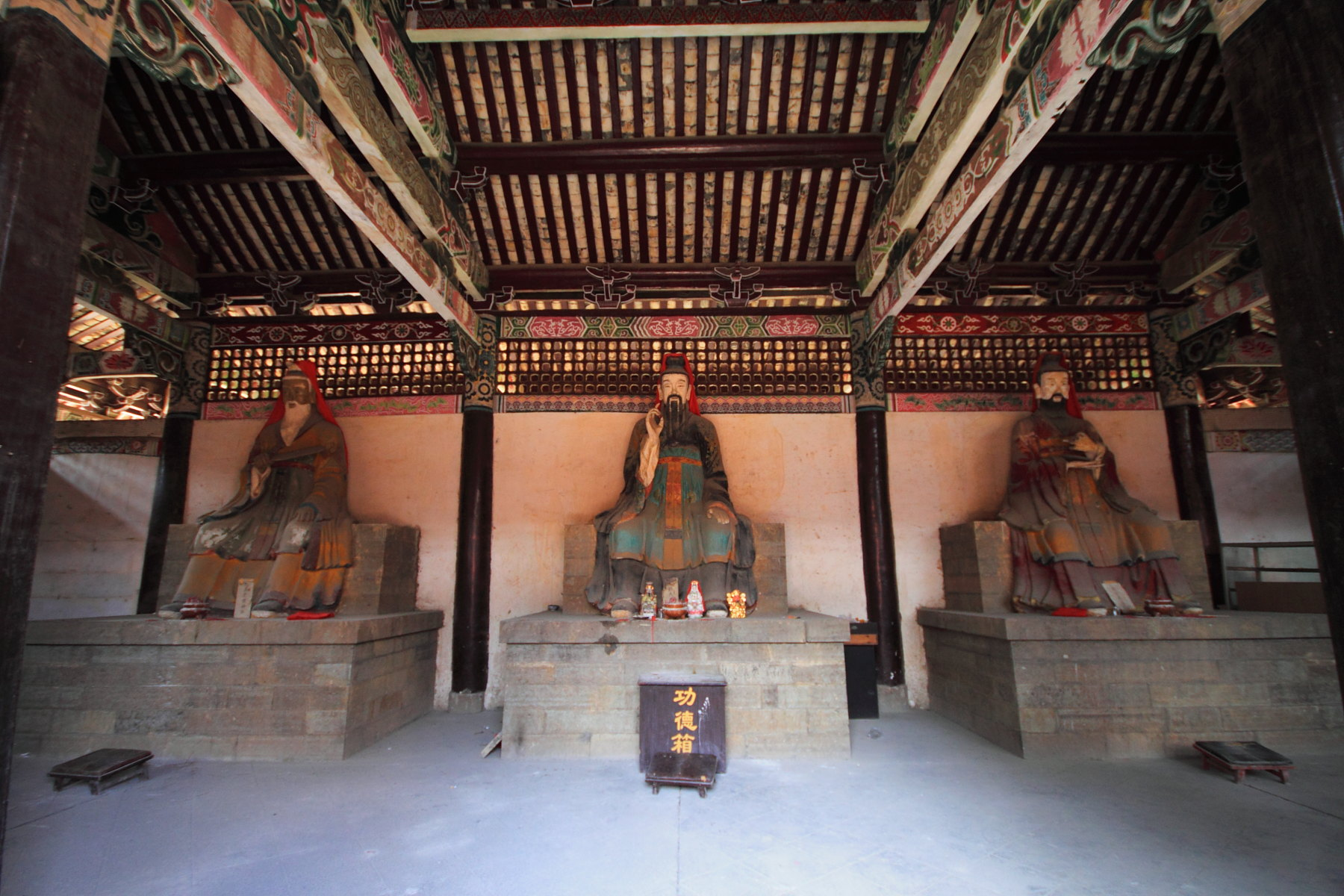
Statues.

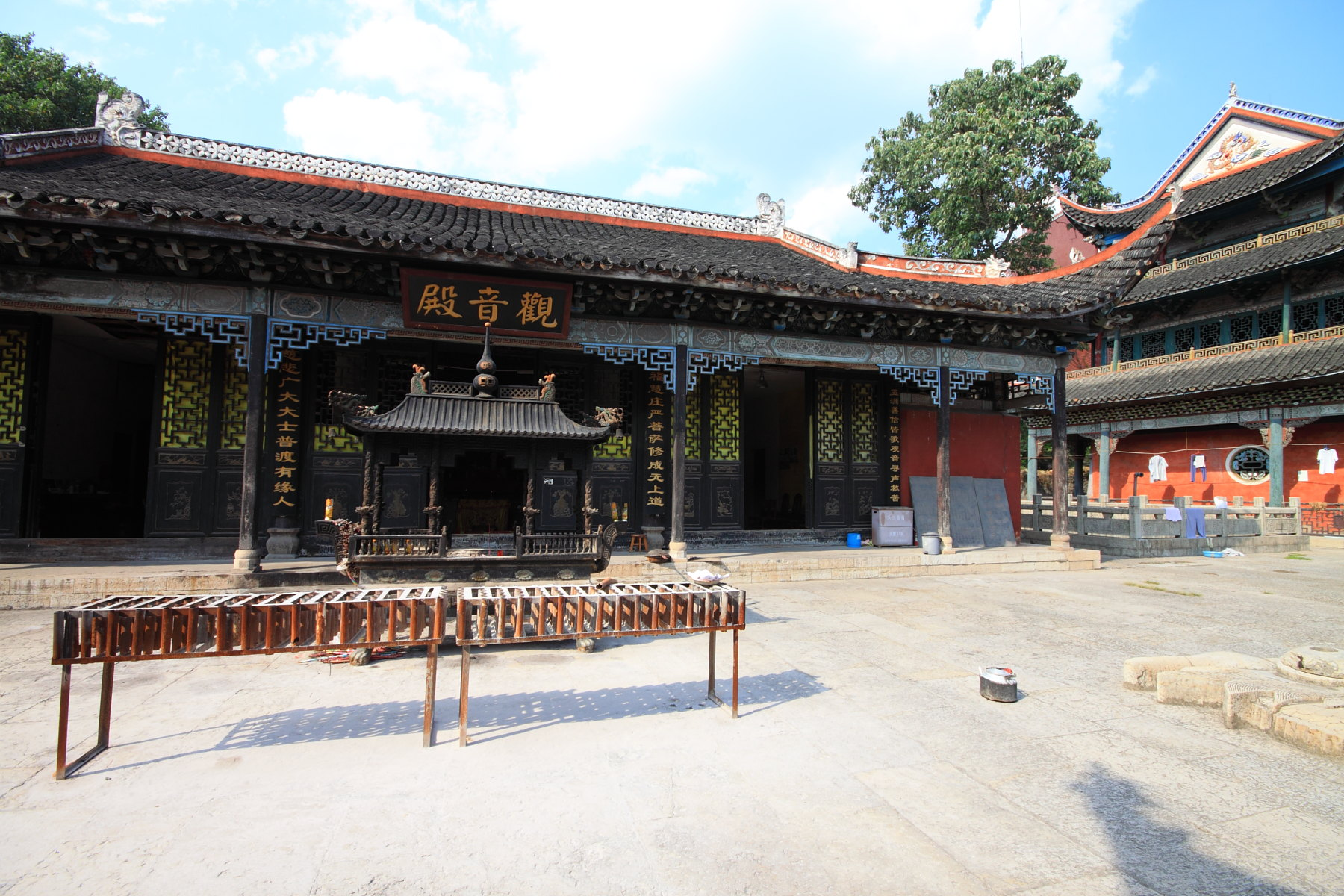
Hall of Guanyin.

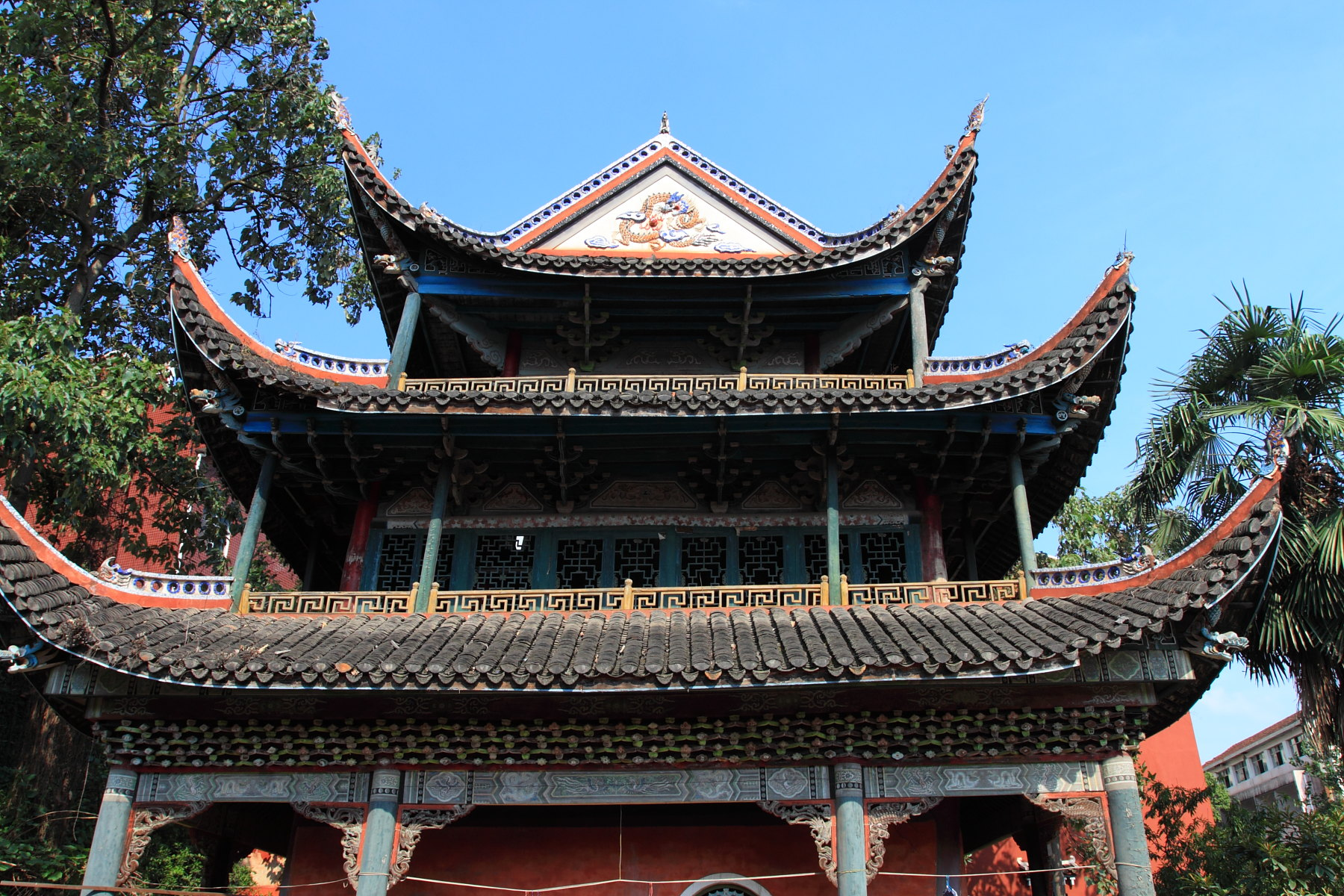
A pavilion.
