= Hongchunping Temple =

Buddhist temple on Mount Emei, Leshan, Sichuan, China

- 洪椿坪
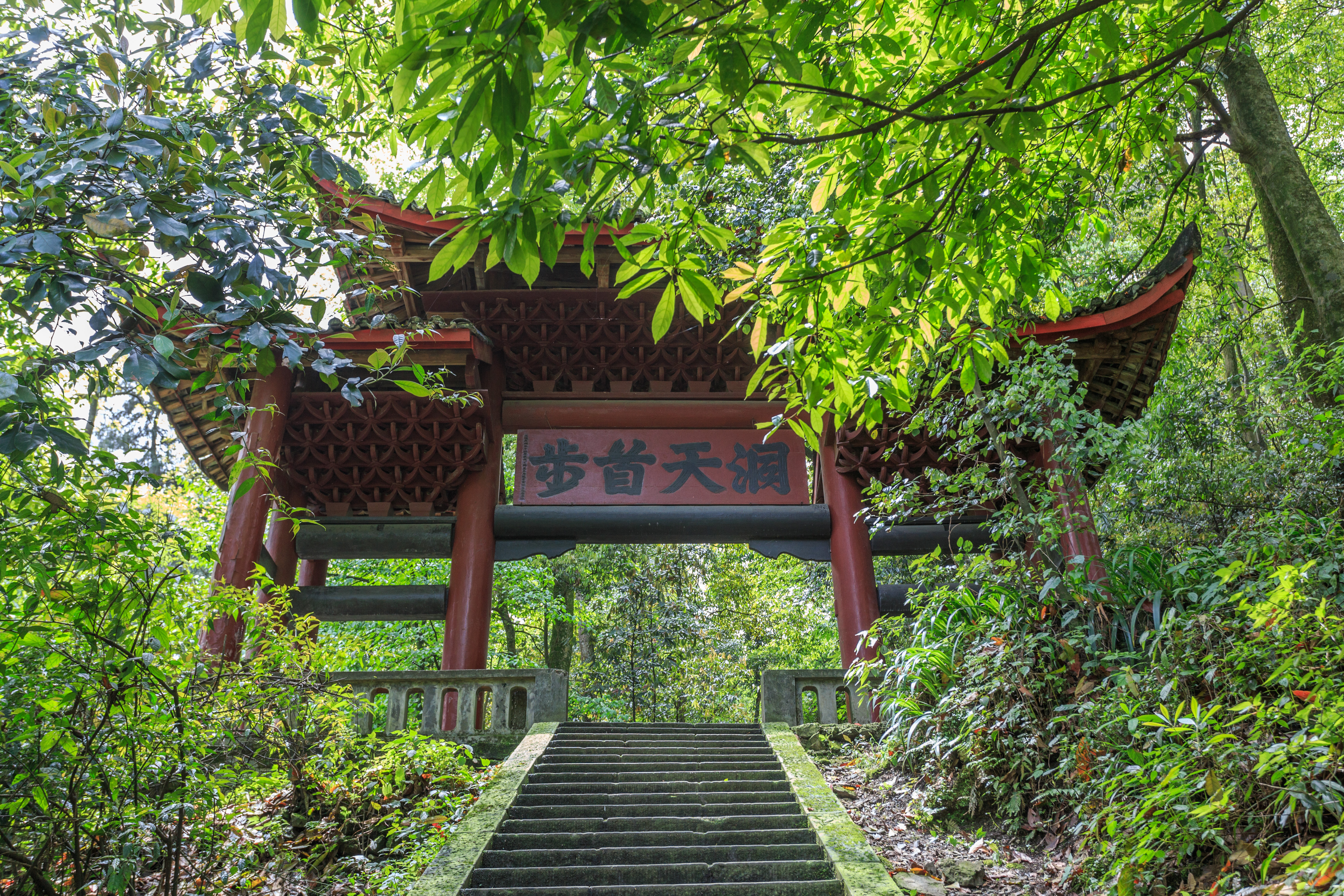
- A paifang in front of Hongchunping Temple.

- Location within Sichuan

Religion
- Affiliation: Buddhism
- Sect: Chan Buddhism

Location
- Location: Mount Emei, Emeishan City, Sichuan
- Country: China
- Interactive map of Hongchunping Temple
- Coordinates: 29°33′29″N 103°23′34″E

Architecture
- Style: Chinese architecture
- Founder: Chushan Xingyi (楚山性一)
- Established: Ming dynasty
- Completed: 1790 (reconstruction)

Hongchunping Temple (Chinese: 洪椿坪; pinyin: Hóngchūnpíng) is a Buddhist temple located on Mount Emei, in Emeishan City, Sichuan, China.

== Name ==
The name of Hongchunping is derived from three 1,200-year-old Ailanthus altissima trees.

== History ==
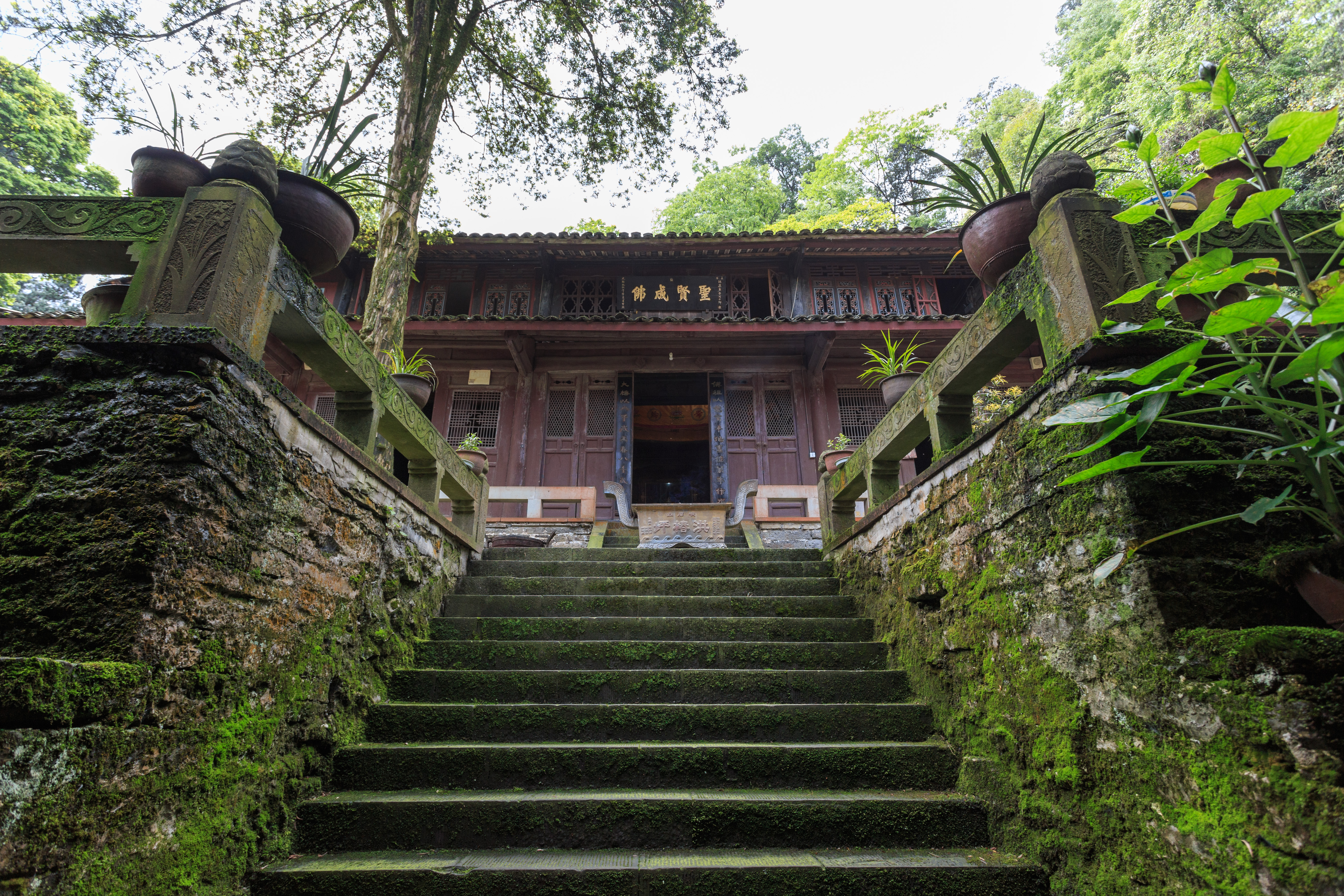
Hongchunping Temple.

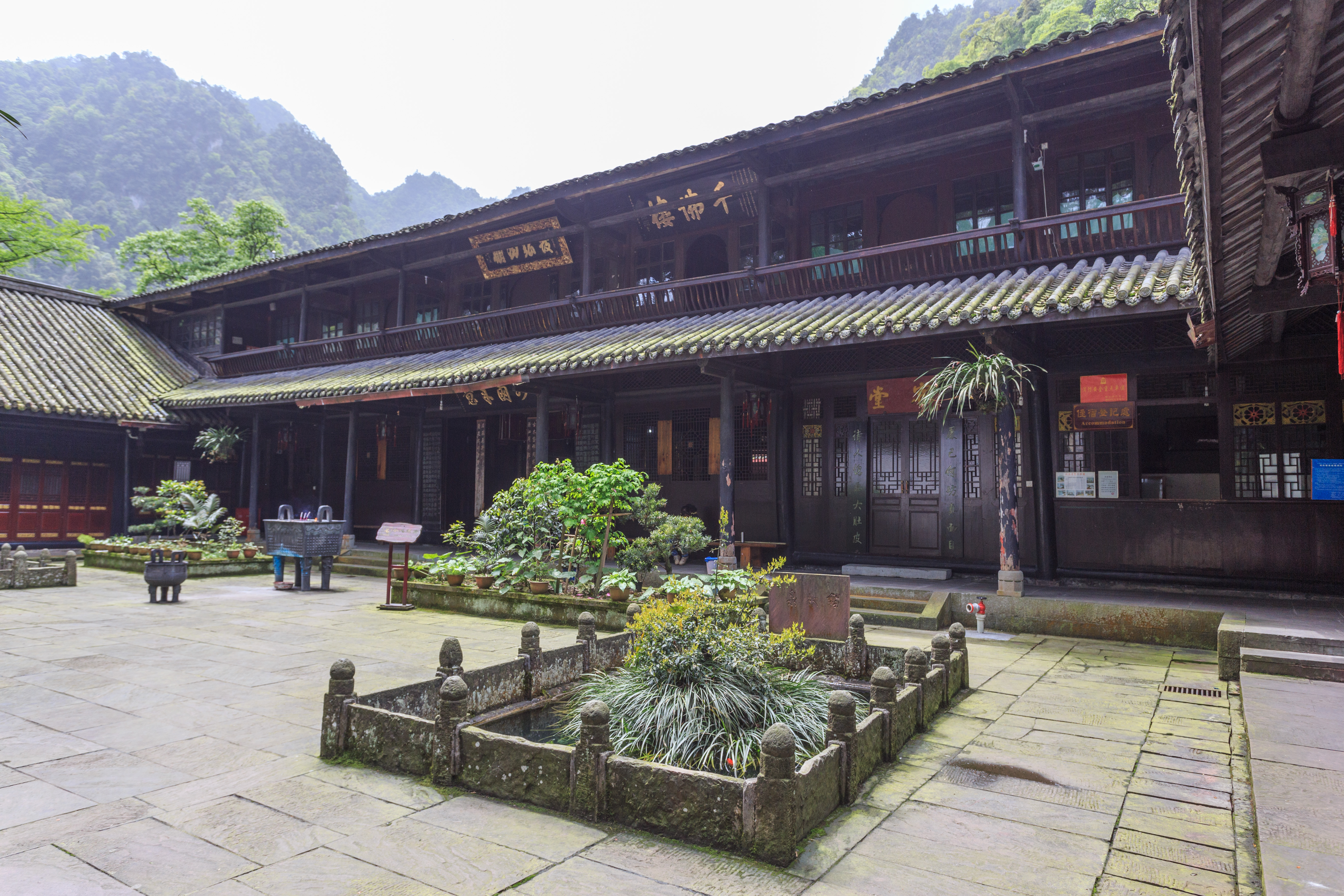
Hongchunping Temple.

The temple was first built by master Chushan Xingyi (楚山性一) in the early Ming dynasty (1368–1644) with the name of "Thousand Buddha Chan Temple" (千佛禅院), commonly known as "Thousand Buddha Temple" (千佛庵). It was largely extended in 1631, in the reign of Chongzhen Emperor (1628–1644) of the late Ming dynasty.

In 1778, in the 43rd year of Qianlong period (1736–1795) in the Qing dynasty (1644–1911), a catastrophic fire demolished most of its buildings. Twelve years later, the temple was restored and redecorated by master Eyun (峨云). The name was changed into "Hongchunping Temple" (Hongchun means Ailanthus altissima) because it had three 1,200-year-old Ailanthus altissima trees.

In 1936, Chiang Kai-shek visited the temple while he inspected the Officer Training Corps on Mount Emei.

The temple has been designated as a National Key Buddhist Temple in Han Chinese Area by the State Council of China in 1983.

== Architecture ==
Hongchunping Temple covers a building area of 5,000 square metres (54,000 sq ft). The existing main buildings include the Shanmen, Hall of Four Heavenly Kings, Hall of Guanyin, Mahavira Hall, Meditation Hall, and monk's rooms.

=== Mahavira Hall ===
The Mahavira Hall enshrining a statue of Samantabhadra. The statues of Eighteen Arhats sitting on the seats before both sides of the gable walls.
