= Puhua Temple =

Buddhist temple in Xinzhou, Shanxi, China

- 普化寺
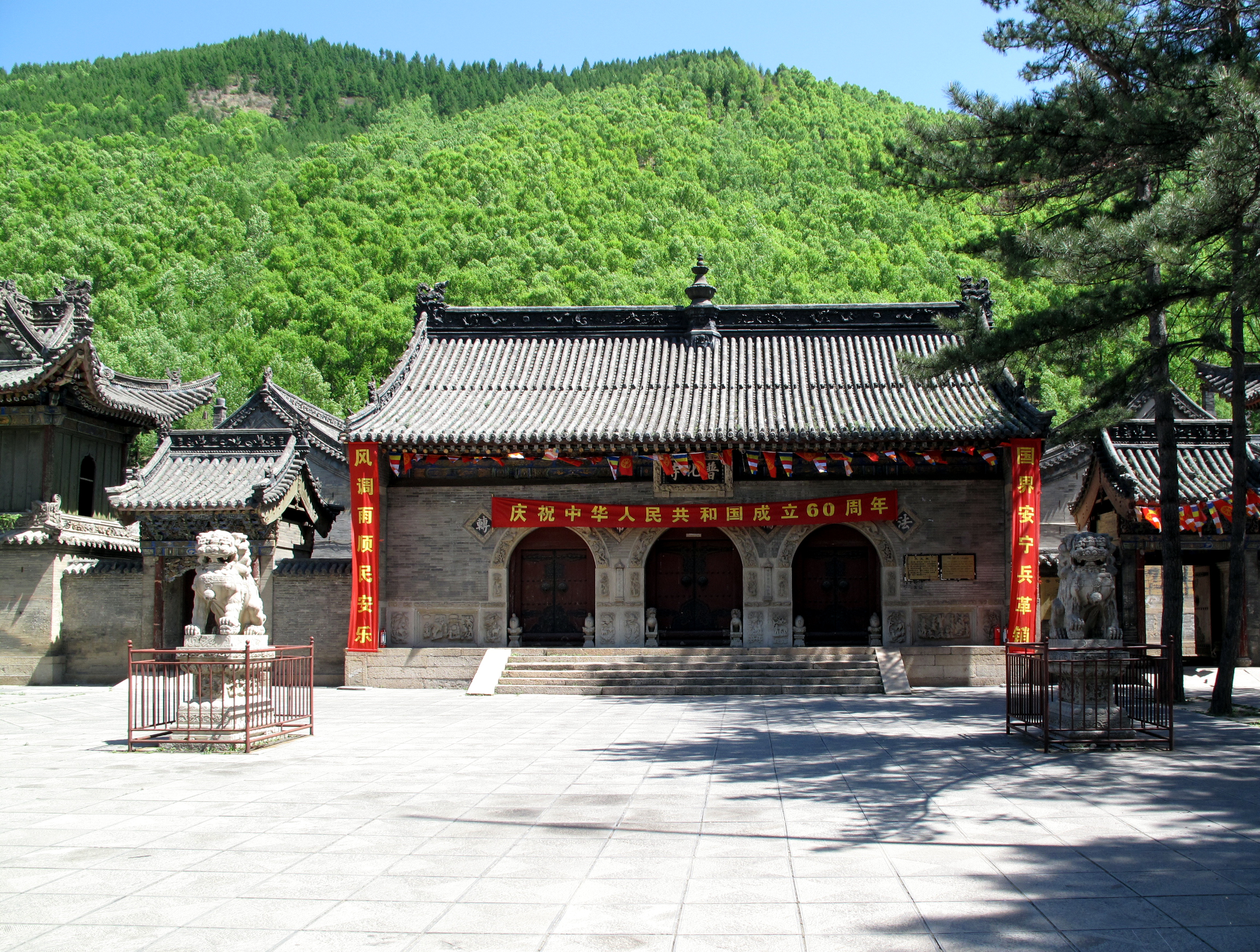
- The shanmen of Puhua Temple.

- Location within Shanxi

Religion
- Affiliation: Buddhism
- Prefecture: Wutai County
- Province: Shanxi

Location
- Country: China
- Interactive map of Puhua Temple
- Prefecture: Wutai County
- Coordinates: 39°00′04″N 113°35′53″E

Architecture
- Style: Chinese architecture
- Established: 1925

The Puhua Temple (Chinese: 普化寺; pinyin: Pǔhuà Sì) is a Buddhist temple located in Taihuai Town of Wutai County, Xinzhou, Shanxi, China.

== History ==
The time for the establishment of the Puhua Temple has been unable to be verified. It is also called "Temple of Jade Emperor" (玉皇庙) and "Palace of Indra" (帝释宫). The present temple was completed in 1925 during the Republic of China (1912-1949).

== Architecture ==
The Puhua Temple complex is located in the east and faces the west. With a brief layout, it includes the Hall of Four Heavenly Kings, Mahavira Hall, Hall of Jade Emperor, Hall of Lü Dongbin, and south and north annex halls. It has a building area of 15,800 square metres (170,000 sq ft).

=== Zhaobi ===
The Zhaobi (照壁) is built by stones and bricks. The front of the Zhaobi are engraved with the Sanxing (deities) (福禄寿三星) and the back of the wall are engraved with Guanyin, Sudhana and Longnü.

=== Hall of Four Heavenly Kings ===
Under the eaves of the Hall of Four Heavenly Kings is a plaque with the Chinese characters "普化寺". In front of the hall, a wooden plaque with a couplet is hung on the two side pillars. It says "皈依三宝极乐地，遵守五戒未来天". Maitreya is enshrined in the hall and at the back of his statue is a statue of Skanda. Unlike other temples, Statues of Nryana are also enshrined in the hall. The hall are carved with openwork patterns, which show proficient skills. The patterns are Monkey King, human figures of cowboy, shepherd, oldman etc. The shrine of Maitreya are engraved with splendid and spectacular wooden dragons. In the wall of the Hall of Four Heavenly Kings are engraved with the Picture-Book of Twenty-Four Acts of Filial Piety (二十四孝图) and the Four Natural Organs (四位天官).

=== Mahavira Hall ===
The Mahavira Hall enshrining the Three Saints of Hua-yan (华严三圣). In the middle is Sakyamuni, statues of Manjushri and Samantabhadra stand on the left and right sides of Sakyamuni's statue. At the back of Sakyamuni's statue are statues of the Three Sages of the West (西方三圣), namely Guanyin, Amitabha and Mahasthamaprapta. The statues of Eighteen Arhats stand on both sides of the hall.

=== Three Buddhas Hall ===
Behind the Mahavira Hall is the Three Buddhas Hall enshrining the statues of Sakyamuni, Amitabha and Bhaisajyaguru. The two disciples' statues are placed in front of the statue of Sakyamuni, the older is called Kassapa Buddha and the middle-aged is called Ananda. Statues of Indra and Brahma are placed next to the statues of Sakyamuni, Amitabha and Bhaisajyaguru. The four pillars inside the hall are engraved with dedicate and gorgeousness karavika-bhani (迦陵频伽鸟). The statues of Eighteen Arhats stand on the platform of gable wall.

== Gallery ==
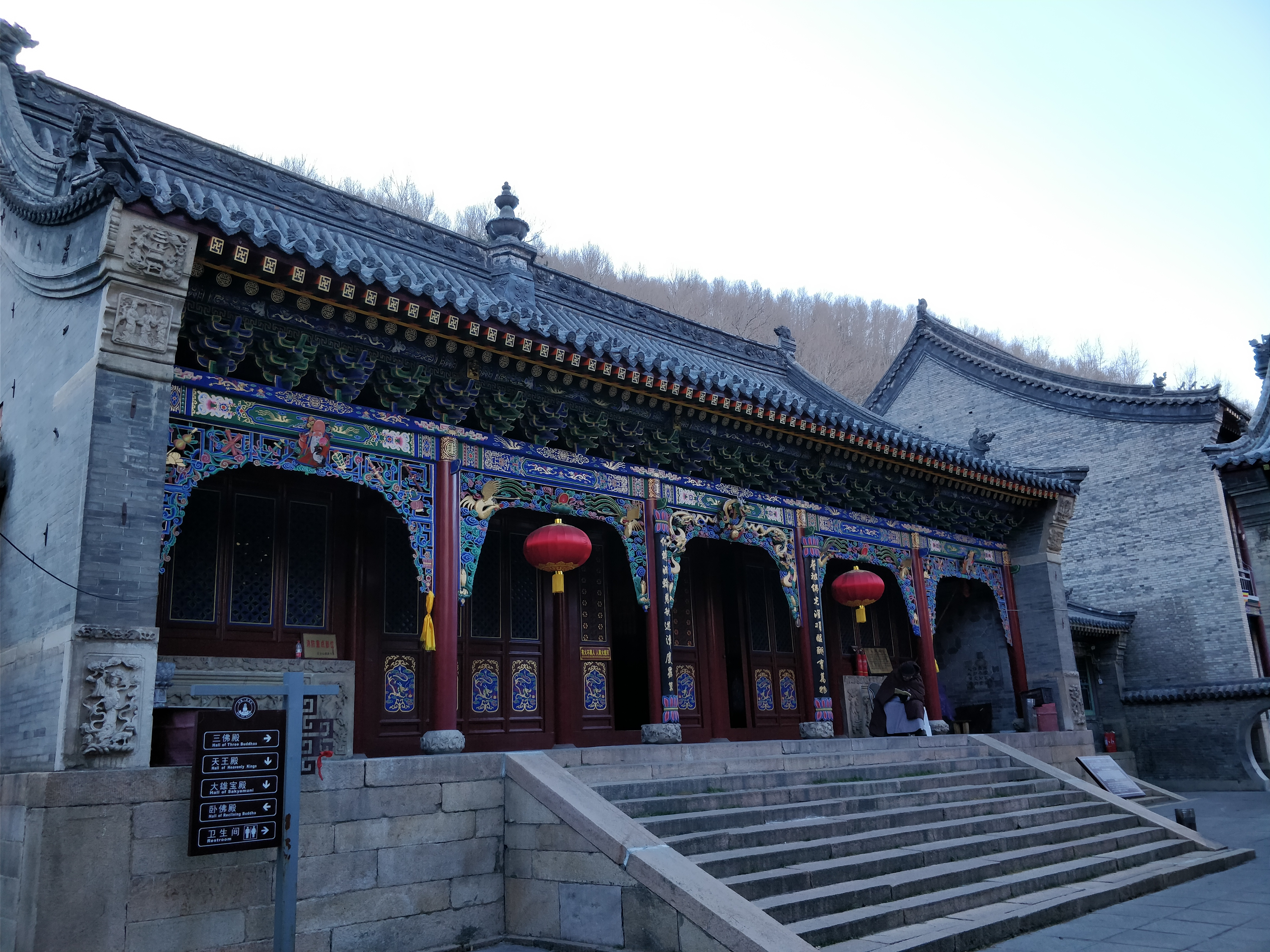
The Three Buddhas Hall at Puhua Temple.

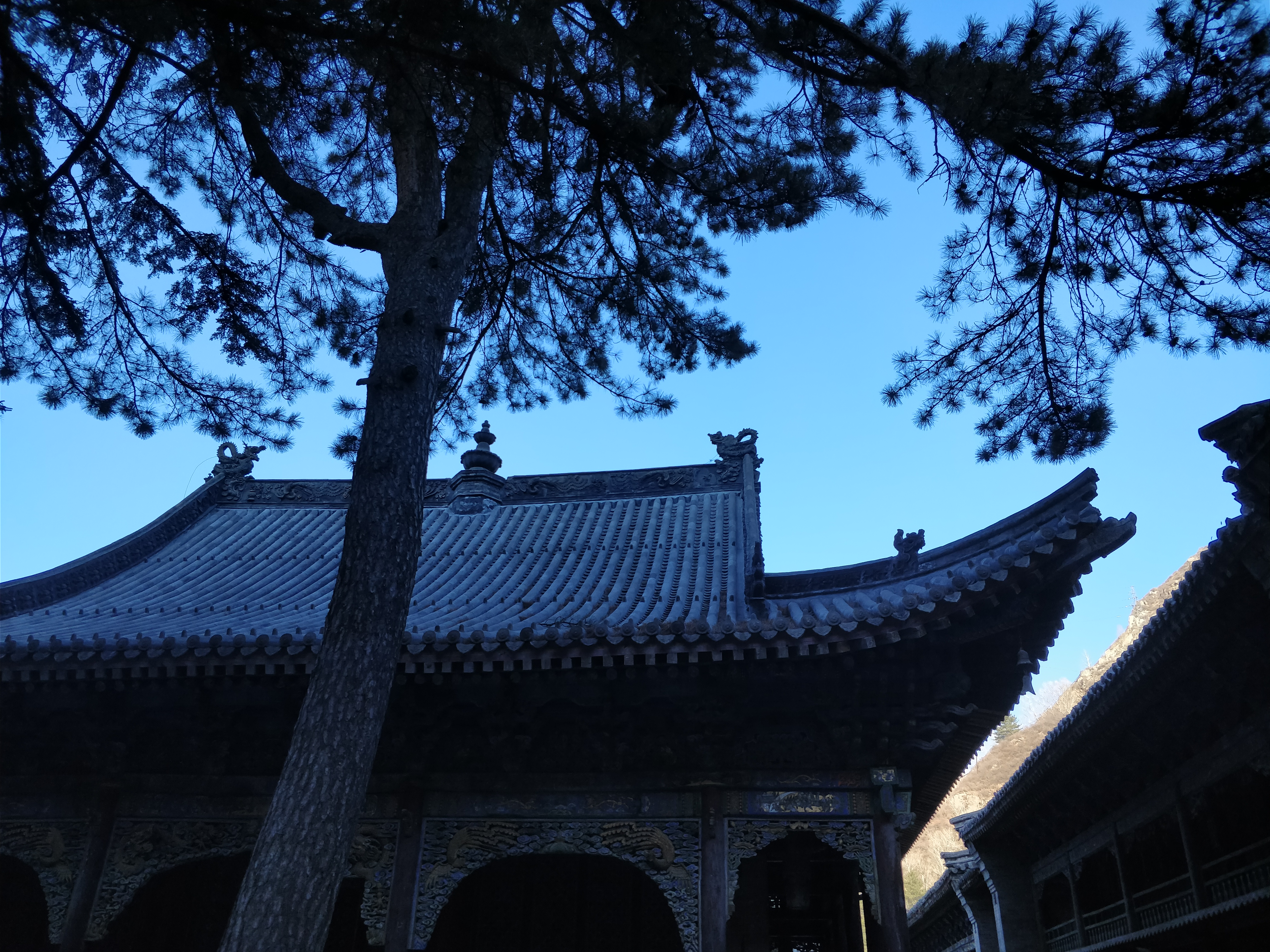
A hall at Puhua Temple.

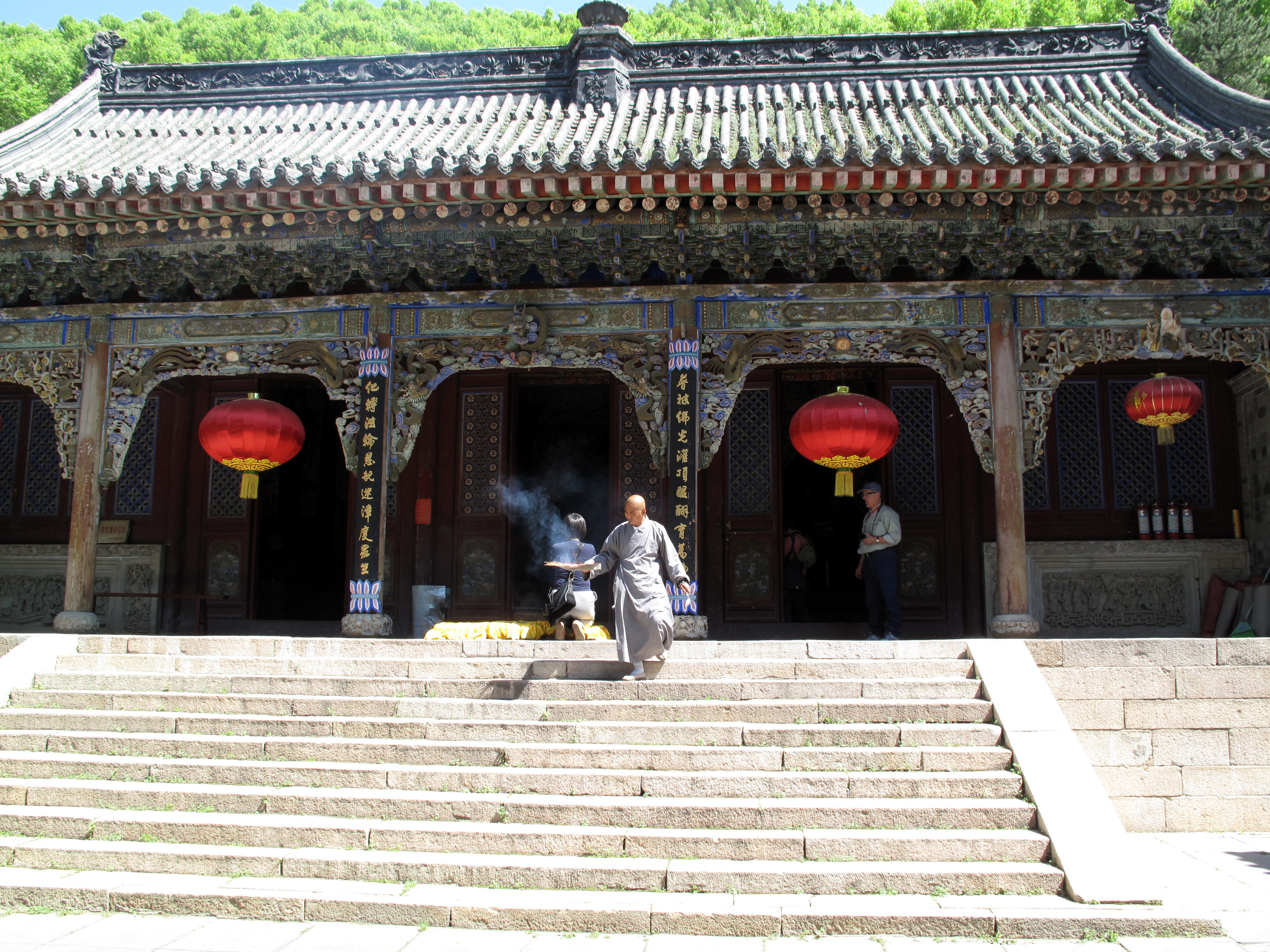
A hall at Puhua Temple.
