= Wenshu Temple (Mount Wutai) =

Buddhist temple in Shanxi, China

- 文殊寺
- Location within Shanxi Location within China

Religion
- Affiliation: Buddhism
- Deity: Tibetan Buddhism
- Leadership: Shi Changqing (释常青)

Location
- Location: Mount Wutai, Xinzhou, Shanxi
- Country: China
- Interactive map of Wenshu Temple
- Coordinates: 38°55′50″N 113°27′59″E

Architecture
- Style: Chinese architecture
- Established: Qianlong period (1736–1795)
- Completed: 1821 (reconstruction)

Wenshu Temple (Chinese: 文殊寺; pinyin: Wénshū Sì), also known as Guang'an Temple (simplified Chinese: 广安寺; traditional Chinese: 廣安寺; pinyin: Guǎng'ān Sì) is a Buddhist temple located at the foot of Mount Wutai, in Taihuai Town of Wutai County, Shanxi, China. It is one of the five residence of Changkya Khutukhtu.

== History ==
The temple was first established in the Qianlong period (1736–1795) of the Qing dynasty (1644–1911). The modern temple was completed in 1821 during the reign of Daoguang Emperor.

On September 19, 2016, the newly established Mahavira Hall was consecrated by eminent Buddhist masters of the Buddhist Association of Mount Wutai.

== Architecture ==
The temple covers an area of 5,180 square metres (55,800 sq ft) and faces the south.

=== Main Hall ===
The Main Hall enshrining the statues of Tsongkhapa and Guanyin. Guanyin has ten small heads, hence the name "Ten Head Guanyin" (十一面观音). Statues of Manjushri, Guanyin and Vajrapani are placed at the back of the hall. On the walls are paintings with stories of Xuanzang went west for sutras and the 500 Arhats.
