= Luohan Temple (Shifang) =

Buddhist temple in Shifang, Sichuan, China

- 罗汉寺
- Location within Sichuan Location within China

Religion
- Affiliation: Buddhism
- Deity: Linji school
- Leadership: Shi Suquan (释素全)

Location
- Location: Shifang, Sichuan
- Country: China
- Interactive map of Luohan Temple
- Coordinates: 31°08′08″N 104°10′00″E

Architecture
- Style: Chinese architecture
- Established: 709
- Completed: Qing dynasty (reconstruction)

Luohan Temple (simplified Chinese: 罗汉寺; traditional Chinese: 羅漢寺; pinyin: Luóhàn Sì; lit. 'Temple of Arhat') is a Buddhist temple located in Shifang, Sichuan, China. The temple is known as the "Buddhist Capital of Western Sichuan".

== History ==
The original temple dates back to 709, during the region of Emperor Zhongzong of the Tang dynasty (618–907). At that time, Mazu Daoyi received ordination as a monk and studied in the temple.

Luohan Temple was badly damaged in wars in 1368. Three years later it was reconstructed. The temple was devastated by wars again in 1644, the year of the fall of the Ming dynasty (1368–1644). The modern temple was restored and redecorated by abbots Shi Nuan (释暖), Yuerong (月容) and Liting (礼汀) in the Qing dynasty (1644–1911).

On May 12, 2008, the Sichuan earthquake broke out, the Maternal and Child Care Service Centre of Shifang was moved to Luohan Temple, a total of 108 babies were born in the temple.

== Architecture ==
=== Shanmen ===
Under the eaves is a plaque with the Chinese characters "Luohan Temple" written by Ji Yingxiong (冀应熊), the magistrate of Chengdu during the Kangxi period of the Qing dynasty.

=== Hall of Four Heavenly Kings ===
The statues of Maitreya Buddha, Skanda and Four Heavenly Kings are enshrined in the Hall of Four Heavenly Kings.

=== Mahavira Hall ===
The Mahavira Hall is the main hall in the temple. In the middle is Sakyamuni, statues of Ananda and Kassapa Buddha stand on the left and right sides of Sakyamuni's statue.

=== Arhat Hall ===
The Arhat Hall enshrining the 500 statues of Arhat.

== Film ==
Luohan Temple was used for location filming of the 2018 drama film 108.
