= Chongshan Temple (Jiangsu) =

Buddhist temple in Yixing, China

- 崇善寺
- Location within Jiangsu

Religion
- Affiliation: Buddhism
- Deity: Chan Buddhism

Location
- Location: Xushe Town, Yixing, Jiangsu
- Country: China
- Interactive map of Chongshan Temple
- Coordinates: 31°24′18″N 119°38′13″E

Architecture
- Style: Chinese architecture
- Founder: Shengkai (圣凯)
- Established: 502–557
- Completed: 1883

Chongshan Temple (Chinese: 崇善寺; pinyin: Chóngshàn Sì) is a Buddhist temple located in Xushe Town of Yixing, Jiangsu, China.

== History ==
=== Liang dynasty ===
The temple traces its origins to the former "Guanyin Hall" (观音堂), founded between 502 and 557 in the Liang dynasty (502–557) and would later become "Chongshan Temple" in the reign of Kangxi Emperor (1662–1922) in the Qing dynasty (1644–1911).

=== Yuan dynasty ===
During the Yuan dynasty (1271–1368), the temple gradually declined and suffered wear and tears.

=== Ming dynasty ===
In 1395, in the 8th year of Hongwu period (1368–1398) in the Ming dynasty (1368–1644), master Puzhi Yizhou (普智益舟) raised funds to restore the Hall of Guanyin, Hall of Four Heavenly Kings, Hall of the God of Wealth, and wing-rooms.

In 1411, in the reign of Yongle Emperor (1402–1424), abbot Qingfo (请佛) elected the Recitation Hall and Buddhist Texts Library. During the ruling of Emperor Yingzong (1457–1464), abbot Zhongxiu (中秀) established the Mahavira Hall. The Hall of Bhaisajyaguru was added to the temple by abbot Chuanjiu (传杦) under the rule of Chenghua Emperor (1465–1487).

Chongshan Temple was completely destroyed by fire during the Manchu invasion of the 17th century.

=== Qing dynasty ===
In 1664, in the 2nd year of Kangxi period (1662–1722) in the Qing dynasty (1644–1911), master Guanghui (光辉) reconstructed the temple and renamed it "Chongshan Temple" (崇善寺).

Most of the temple buildings were devastated in 1854 during the Taiping Rebellion, when the Taiping army were defeated by the Qing army.

In 1883, in the Guangxu era (1875–1908), abbot Yanlian (演莲) restored the temple.

Chongshan Temple was gradually fell into ruin in the late Qing dynasty and early Republic of China.

=== People's Republic of China ===
After the establishment of the Communist State, abbot Quanyao (诠耀) refurbished and redecorated the temple.

Chongshan Temple was used as a warehouse in the Great Leap Forward.

Chongshan Temple reactivated its religious activities in 1995.
