= Hongfu Temple (Shanghai) =

Buddhist temple in Shanghai, China

- 洪福寺
- Location within Shanghai Location within China

Religion
- Affiliation: Buddhism
- Deity: Chan Buddhism
- Leadership: Shi Shenghuai (释圣怀)

Location
- Location: Fengxian District, Shanghai
- Country: China
- Interactive map of Hongfu Temple
- Coordinates: 30°56′09″N 121°42′23″E

Architecture
- Style: Chinese architecture
- Established: 1766
- Completed: 1995 (reconstruction)

Website
- www.hfs.sh.cn

Hongfu Temple (Chinese: 洪福寺; pinyin: Hóngfú Sì) is a Buddhist temple located in Fengxian District of Shanghai, China.

== History ==
Hongfu Temple was first established in 1766, during the mid-Qing dynasty, the modern temple was founded in 1995.

== Architecture ==
The temple occupies an area of 20,000 square metres (220,000 sq ft). Along the central axis are the Paifang, Four Heavenly Kings Hall, Mahavira Hall and Buddhist Texts Library. There are over 10 halls and rooms on both sides, including Guru Hall, Abbot Hall, Monastic Dining Hall, Monastic Reception Hall and Meditation Hall.

=== Paifang ===
The Paifang is engraved with the words "Hongfu Temple" written by the former Venerable Master of the Buddhist Association of China Zhao Puchu.

=== Four Heavenly Kings Hall ===
The statues of Maitreya Buddha, Skanda and Four Heavenly Kings are enshrined in the Hall of Four Heavenly Kings. They are the eastern Dhṛtarāṣṭra, the southern Virūḍhaka, the western Virūpākṣa, and the northern Vaiśravaṇa.

=== Mahavira Hall ===
The Mahavira Hall enshrining the wood carving statues of Sakyamuni, Suryaprabha and Bhaisajyaguru. Guanyin, Manjushri and Samantabhadra are placed at Sakyamuni's back. The statues of Sixteen Arhats and Sixteen Yakshas stand on both sides of the hall.
