= Jingye Temple (Shaanxi) =

Buddhist temple in Shaanxi, China

- 净业寺

- Location within China

Religion
- Affiliation: Buddhism
- Sect: Risshū

Location
- Location: Chang'an District, Xi'an, Shaanxi
- Country: China
- Coordinates: 34°01′49″N 108°50′01″E

Architecture
- Style: Chinese architecture
- Established: 581

Jingye Temple (simplified Chinese: 净业寺; traditional Chinese: 淨業寺; pinyin: Jìngyè Sì) is a Buddhist temple located on the north slope of Zhongnan Mountains, in Chang'an District, Xi'an, Shaanxi, China. It is the cradle of Risshū.

== History ==
=== Sui dynasty ===
The temple was first established in 581, at the dawn of Sui dynasty (589–618).

=== Tang dynasty ===
In 624 in the 7th year of Wude period (618–626) in the Tang dynasty (618–907), master Daoxuan resided in the temple, where he taught Risshū and promulgated Buddhist doctrines. The temple was renamed "Baiquan Temple" (白泉寺).

In 665, during the reign of Emperor Gaozong (650–683), the emperor issued the decree building a stone ordination altar (戒坛). Jianzhen, a disciple of Risshū, led monks to go to Japan to deliver Risshū, he was the founder of Japanese Buddhism Risshū.

After the fall of the Tang dynasty, Jingye Temple fell into decline.

=== Ming dynasty ===
The temple underwent three renovations in the Ming dynasty (1638–1644), respectively in the ruling of Emperor Yingzong (1437) by abbot Yunxiu (云秀) and in the 4th year of Tianshun period (1460) abbot Benquan (本泉) and in the 1st year of Longqing period (1567).

=== Qing dynasty ===
In 1681, in the 20th year of Kangxi period (1662–1722) of the Qing dynasty (1644–1911), master Yan'an (严安) disseminated Buddhism in the temple.

In 1812, in the region of Jiaqing Emperor (1796–1820), abbot Jigui (际桂) renovated the temple.

In 1832, in the 12th year of Daoguang period (1821–1850), master Mingchuan (明川) renovated the temple again.

=== Republic of China ===
In 1921, master Zhihai (智海) came to Jingye Temple to preach Buddhism.

=== People's Republic of China ===
After the establishment of the Communist State, Foxin (佛心) and Zhizhen (智真) successively served as abbot of the temple.

In 1960, the temple had been a resurgence of interest in Buddhism, more than 50 monks lived in the temple.

In 1966, Mao Zedong launched the Cultural Revolution, the temple was devastated by the Red Guards. Scriptures, historical documents, statues of Buddha, and other works of art were either removed, damaged or destroyed in the movement.

After the 3rd Plenary Session of the 11th Central Committee of the Chinese Communist Party, according to the national policy of free religious belief, Jingye Temple was officially reopened to the public in 1983. That same year, it was designated as a National Key Buddhist Temple in Han Chinese Area.

== Architecture ==
The entire temple faces south with the Shanmen, Four Heavenly Kings Hall, Mahavira Hall, Five Contemplations Dining Hall, and the Buddhist Texts Library along the central axis of the complex.

=== Shanmen ===
The Shanmen was designed by Zhang Jinqiu (张锦秋). There is a plaque under the eaves written by Nan Huai-Chin in Chinese characters: "Jingye Temple".

=== Four Heavenly Kings Hall ===
Maitreya is enshrined in the Hall of Four Heavenly Kings and at the back of his statue is a statue of Skanda. Four Heavenly Kings' statues are enshrined in the left and right side of the hall. Statue of Daoxuan is placed in the center of the hall.

=== Mahavira Hall ===
Behind the Four Heavenly Kings Hall is the Mahavira Hall enshrining the statues of Sakyamuni, Amitabha and Bhaisajyaguru.

=== Stupa of Daoxuan ===
In 667, master Daoxuan died in Jingye Temple, his disciples built a stupa to commemorate him. Emperor Yizong named it "Jingguang Stupa" (净光塔). The stupa was collapsed in an earthquake. It was rebuilt in 1567. The present version was completed in 1713.

The present Stupa of Daoxuan was built in 1713 and renovated in 1832, it is multi-eaves style brick stupa with five stories. The hexagonal-shaped stupa is about 6 metres (20 ft) high.
