= Baisui Palace =

Chinese Buddhist temple

- 百岁宫
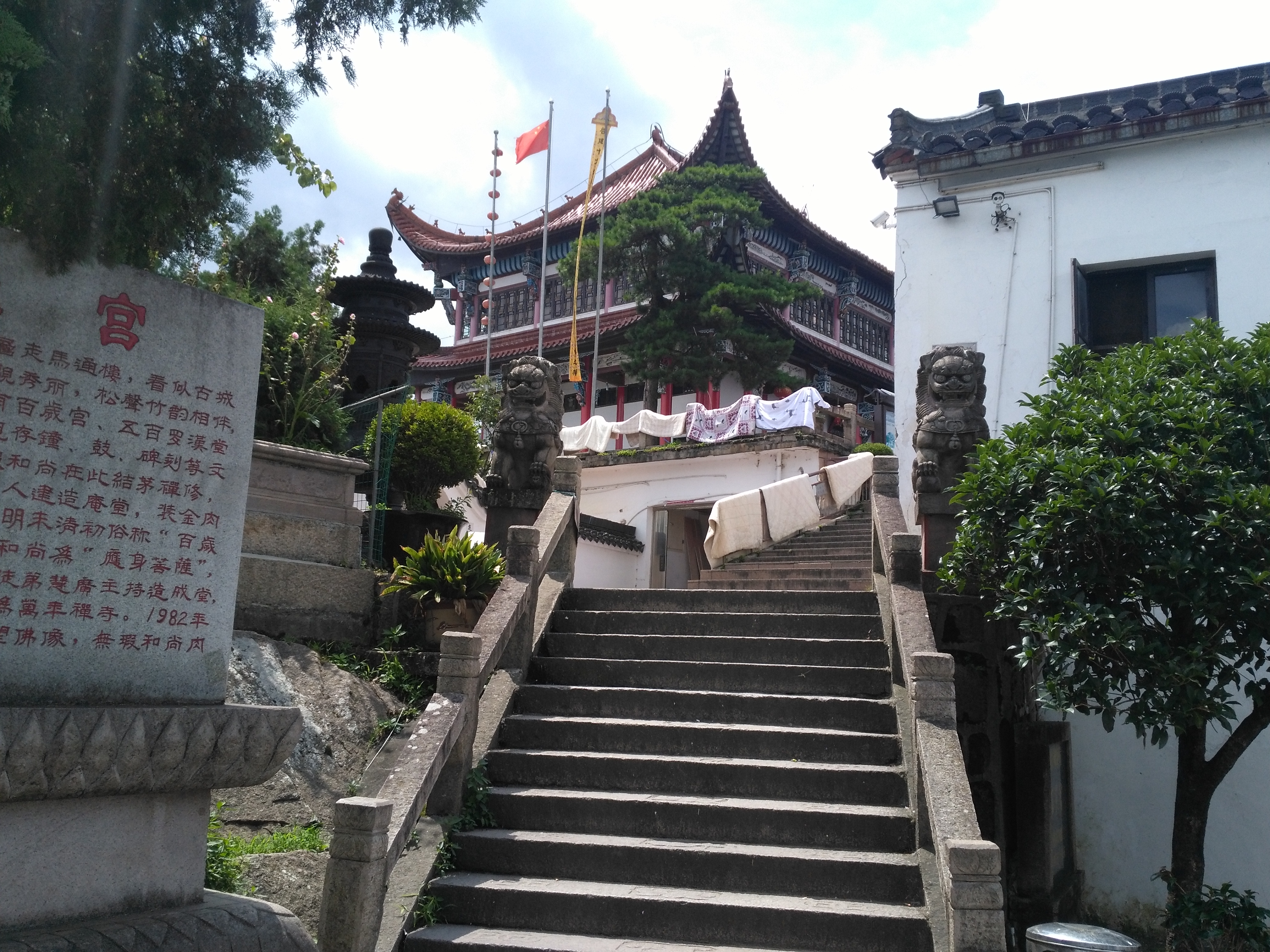

Religion
- Affiliation: Buddhism
- Sect: Chan Buddhism
- Leadership: Shi Huiqing (释慧庆)

Location
- Location: Mount Jiuhua, Chizhou, Anhui
- Country: China
- Interactive map of Baisui Palace
- Coordinates: 30°29′12″N 117°48′56″E

Architecture
- Style: Chinese architecture
- Founder: Haiyu (海玉)
- Established: 1573–1620
- Completed: 1721 (reconstruction)

Baisui Palace (simplified Chinese: 百岁宫; traditional Chinese: 百歲宮; pinyin: Baǐsuì Gōng) is a Buddhist temple located on the top of Chaxiao Peak, in Chizhou, Anhui, China. Over the course of 400 years, the temple was destroyed and rebuilt several times, due to war and natural disasters. Alongside Zhiyuan Temple, Dongyan Chan Temple and Ganlu Temple, it was venerated as one of the "Four Great Buddhist Temples in Mount Jiuhua".

== History ==
=== Ming dynasty ===
The temple was first built in the Wanli period (1573–1620) of the Ming dynasty (1368–1644) by monk Haiyu (海玉), who more commonly known as "Master Wuxia" (无瑕禅师). Haiyu died by age 110, his body became a mummy.

=== Qing dynasty ===
The temple underwent five renovations in the whole Qing dynasty (1644–1911). In 1717 in the reign of Kangxi Emperor (1662–1722), a disastrous fire consumed the temple, and it was restored in 1721 by abbot Sancheng (三乘). It was refurbished and redecorated in 1814 and 1826 respectively.

In 1853, in the ruling of Xianfeng Emperor, most of the temple buildings were destroyed during the war between the Taiping Rebellion of the Qing army.

Part of the temple was destroyed by fire in the late Guangxu period (1875–1908). The mummy of Haiyu, gold seal, jade seal survived.

=== Republic of China ===
From 1931 to 1953, monk Changdi (常谛), Juezhen (觉真), Wuguang (悟光) and Xinmiao (心妙) successively served as abbot of the temple.

=== People's Republic of China ===
After the 3rd Plenary Session of the 11th Central Committee of the Chinese Communist Party, the local government refurbished and redecorated the temple in 1982.

The temple has been designated as National Key Buddhist Temple in Han Chinese Area by the State Council of China in 1983.

== Architecture ==
The temple occupies a building area of 2,987 square metres (32,150 sq ft). The existing main buildings include the Shanmen, Mahavira Hall, Body Hall (肉身殿), Dining Hall, storehouse, and monk's House.
