= 青陽 =

青陽, 青阳 or 靑陽 may refer to:

- Cheongyang (청양), South Chungcheong, South Korea
- Qingyang, Anhui, China
- Sung Ching-yang (宋青陽; born 1992), Taiwanese speed skater

== See also ==
- The dictionary definition of 青 at Wiktionary
- The dictionary definition of 靑 at Wiktionary
- The dictionary definition of 陽 at Wiktionary
- The dictionary definition of 阳 at Wiktionary
- Qingyang (disambiguation)
