= Dizang of Mount Jiuhua =

Statue in Qingyang, Anhui, China

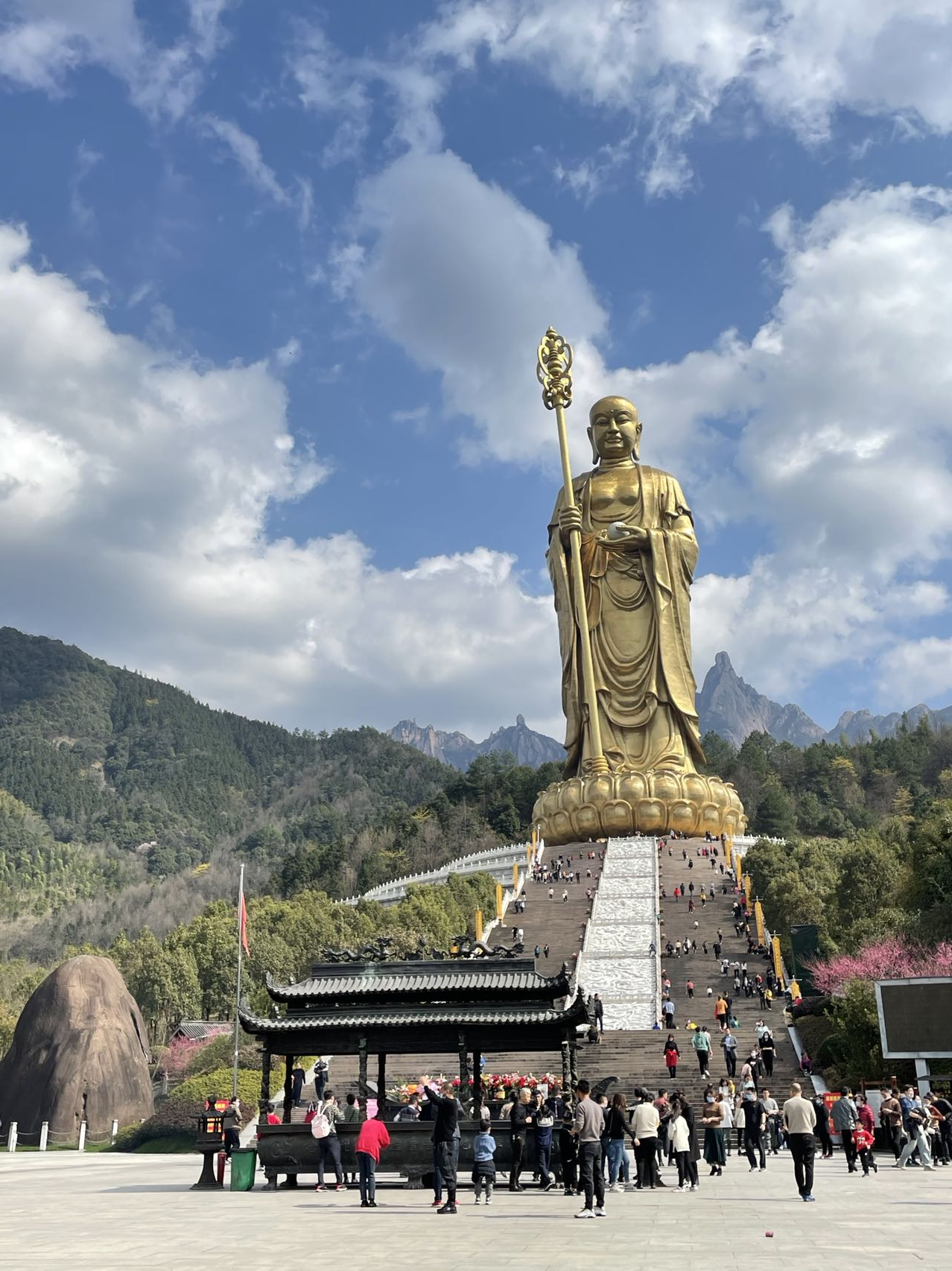
- Bronze Statue of Dizang
- Location: Mount Jiuhua; Qingyang, Chizhou, Anhui Province; China
- Coordinates: 30.538889°N 117.804167°E
- Type: Statue
- Material: Bronze
- Height: 109.9 metres (361 ft)
- Dedicated date: 2012
- Dedicated to: Ksitigarbha

The Dizang of Mount Jiuhua is a 76 metres (249 ft) high (99 metres (325 ft) including pedestal, and 109.9 metres (361 ft) including staff) statue of a standing bodhisattva Kṣitigarbha located in Qingyang County, Chizhou, Anhui Province, China on Mount Jiuhua. It is located in the Huashan Dayuan Cultural Park.

As of 2025, it is the fifteenth-tallest statue in the world.

== History ==
The statue's construction was completed in 2012.

== Design ==
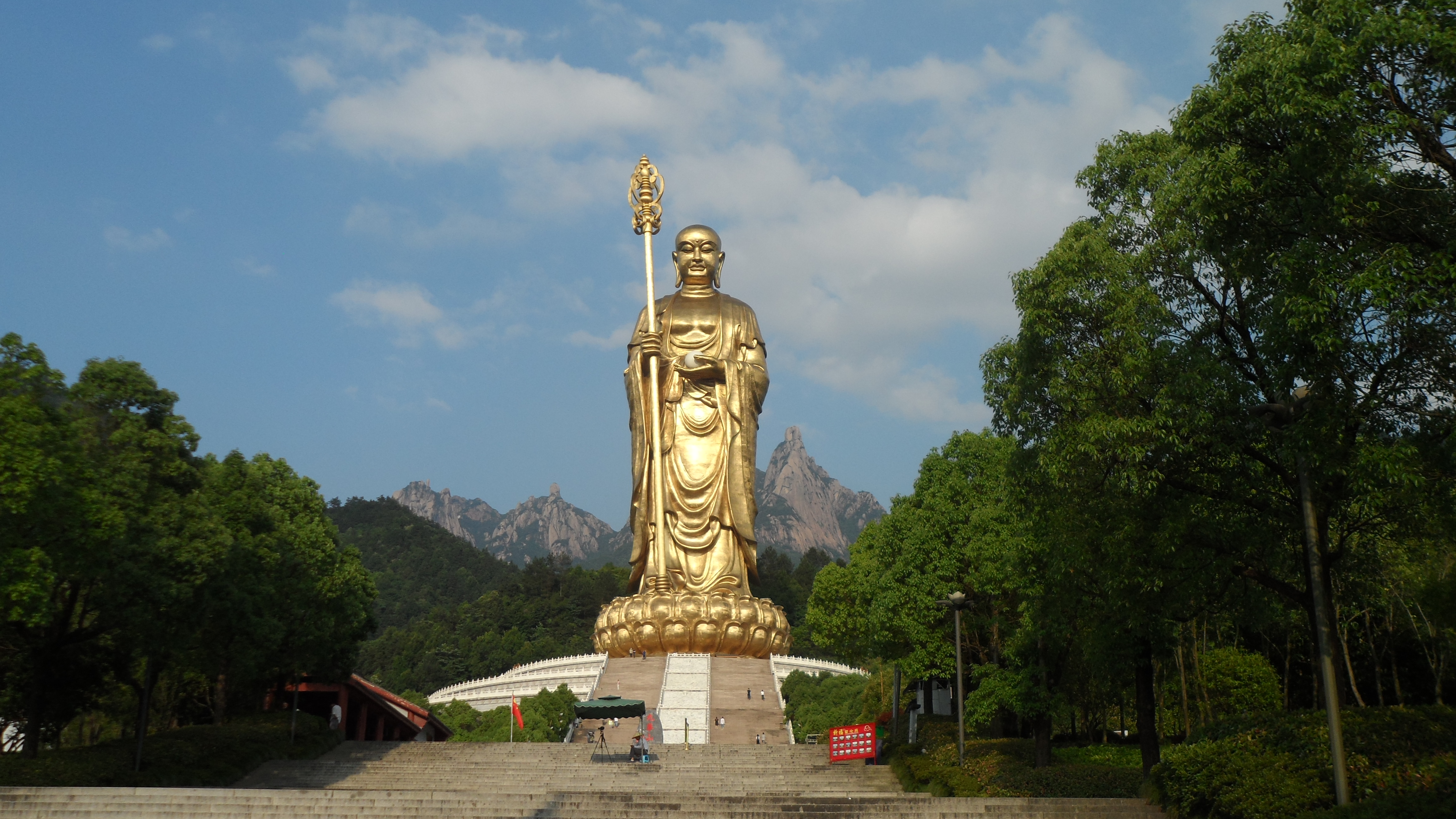
The statue of Ksitigarbha Bodhisattva

The statue is located in one of the four sacred Buddhist mountains in China, Mount Jiuhua, and is made of bronze painted gold. It stands on a lotus throne and holds a khakkhara pewter staff in the right hand and a cintāmaṇi pearl in the left hand. It stands on a 23 metres (75 ft) high pedestal.

Facing the northwest, the statue is designed to represent both dignity and kindness, to show "all living beings, the country is peaceful and the people are safe". The design also has a careful choice of its angle in considering sunlight and the mountain. The back of the bronze statue is to the east, with Lion Peak as the background. At sunrise during the spring and autumn equinoxes, sunlight shines directly on its front, creating a "Buddha light" phenomenon.

== See also ==
- List of tallest statues
