= Chiyang Subdistrict =

Chiyang Subdistrict 池阳街道
- Subdistrict
- Location in China
- Coordinates: 30°39′14″N 117°28′49″E
- Country: China
- Province: Anhui
- Prefecture-level city: Chizhou
- District: Guichi District
- Time zone: UTC+8 (China Standard Time)

Chiyang Subdistrict (Chinese: 池阳街道; pinyin: Chíyáng Jiēdào; Wade–Giles: Chi’hyang) is a subdistrict under the jurisdiction of Guichi District, Chizhou City, Anhui Province, People's Republic of China. Chiyang Subdistrict's government office is located in the north of Guichi, bordering the Yangtze River in the north, Qiupu Subdistrict in the south, the old Qingxi River in the east, and Baiyang and Qiupu Rivers in the west. As of 2020, it administers the following six residential neighborhoods:

- Xiushan (秀山)
- Gushun (古舜)
- Yanliuyuan (烟柳园)
- Nanxinyuan (南馨园)
- Qiujiang (秋江)
- Qingfeng (清风)

== See also ==
- List of township-level divisions of Anhui
