= Chizhou Jiuhuashan Airport =

Chizhou Jiuhuashan Airport 池州九华山机场
- IATA: JUH; ICAO: ZSJH

Summary
- Airport type: Public
- Serves: Chizhou and Tongling
- Location: Guichi District, Chizhou, Anhui, China
- Opened: 29 July 2013; 13 years ago
- Coordinates: 30°44′25″N 117°41′12″E
- Website: jhsairport.com

Map
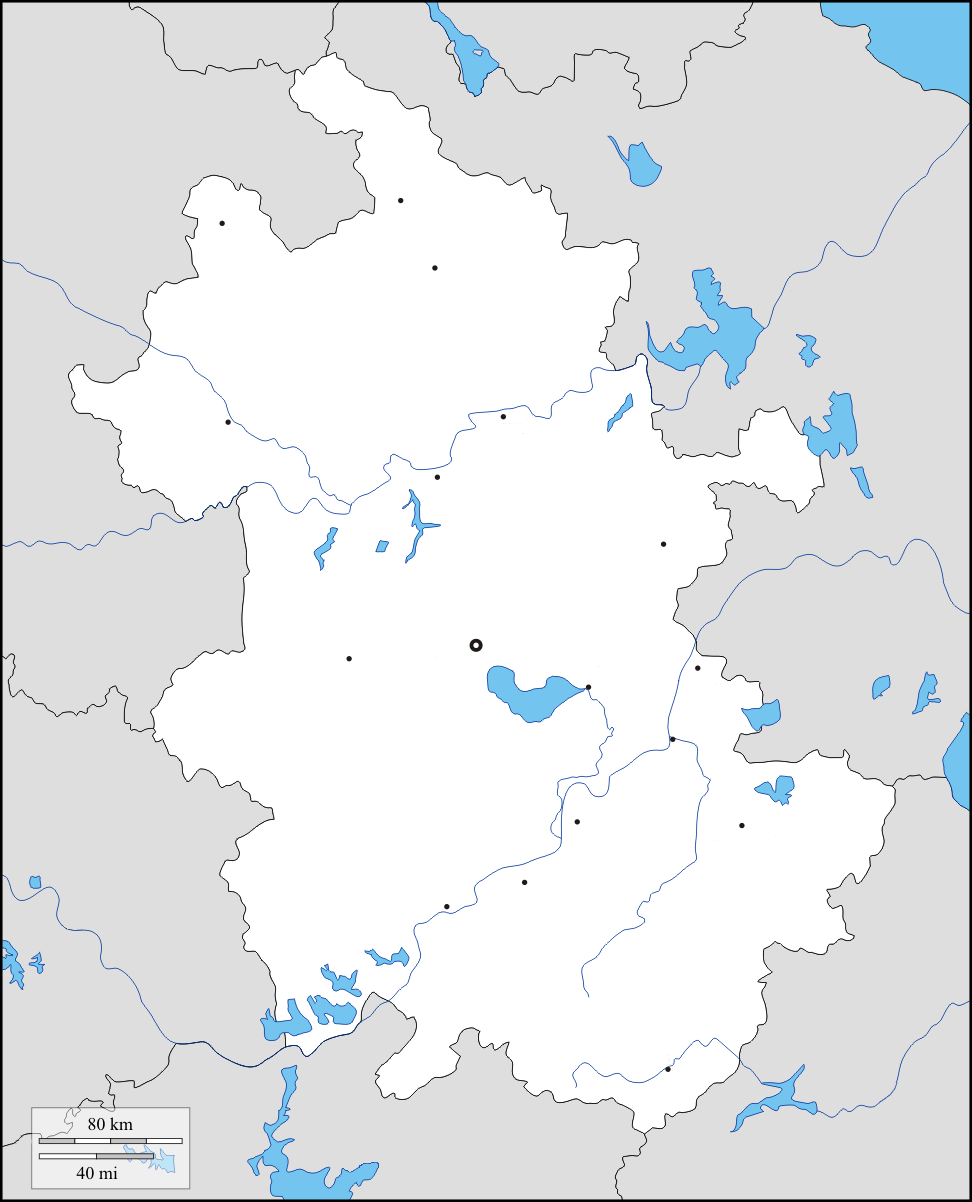
- Location of airport in Anhui

Runways
Direction	Length		Surface
Direction	m	ft	Surface
13/31	2,400	7,874	Concrete

Statistics (2025)
- Passengers: 324,119
- Aircraft movements: 8,855
- Cargo (metric tons): 632.1
- Sources: CAAC

Chizhou Jiuhuashan Airport
- Simplified Chinese: 池州九华山机场
- Traditional Chinese: 池州九華山機場
Transcriptions
Standard Mandarin
- Hanyu Pinyin: Chízhōu Jiǔhuàshān Jīchǎng

Chizhou Jiuhuashan Airport (IATA: JUH, ICAO: ZSJH) is an airport serving the city of Chizhou in Anhui Province, China. It is located in Guichi District, 20 km (12 mi) from the city center. The airport also serves the city of Tongling and the Buddhist sacred mountain of Jiuhuashan, both 20 km (12 mi) away. Construction of the airport began on 26 August 2009. It was originally expected to cost 609 million yuan and to open in 2011, but the actual opening date was 29 July 2013, with a total cost of 889 million yuan.

== History ==
In 2005, Chizhou Jiuhuashan Airport was listed in the 2020 Civil Aviation Transport Airport Construction Plan.

On August 26, 2009, the groundbreaking ceremony for Chizhou Jiuhuashan Airport was held. The new airport had a 4C flight zone rating, a 2,400-meter-long runway, and a terminal building with a designed area of 6,000 square meters. The total investment is over 600 million yuan, covering an area of 3,200 mu. The airport is 20 kilometers away from Jiuhua Mountain Scenic Area, which is one of the four major Buddhist holy sites in China.

Construction of the airport was completed by the end of 2012. Calibration flights were completed in February 2013, test flights in April 2013. On April 23, 2013, Chizhou Jiuhuashan Airport successfully passed the verification test flight, with the test aircraft being an A320 passenger plane from China Eastern Airlines. The airport passed industry acceptance inspection in June 2013. On July 29, 2013, flight KN2325 flew from Beijing to Chizhou and landed at Chizhou Jiuhuashan Airport, marking the official opening of Chizhou.

On December 29, 2018, the expansion and renovation project of Chizhou Jiuhuashan Airport officially commenced. Upon completion, the airport's annual passenger throughput capacity would be 1.9 million. The expansion would extend the runway from 2,400 meters to 2,800 meters, and increase the number of parking stands from 5 to 12. A new 14,000-square-meter terminal building and three new boarding bridges would also be constructed. The expansion and renovation project of Jiuhuashan Airport officially started construction in May 2020 and was completed and passed acceptance inspection in August 2024.

On December 11, 2024, Shenzhen Airlines flight ZH8935 landed, marking the official opening of Terminal 2 at Chizhou Airport. Terminal 1 ceased operation on December 10 after the end of the day's flights.

In February 2026, all works of the airport expansion and renovation project passed the industry acceptance by the Civil Aviation Administration of East China and were officially ready for operation.

== Facilities ==
The airport has a runway that is 2,400 meters long and 45 meters wide. It is designed to handle 500,000 passengers per year.

== Airlines and destinations ==
Airlines	Destinations
Chengdu Airlines	Chengdu–Tianfu, Zhoushan
China Express Airlines	Chongqing, Quanzhou
China United Airlines	Beijing–Daxing
Shenzhen Airlines	Shenzhen
Tianjin Airlines	Guiyang, Qingdao, Xiamen, Xi'an

== See also ==
- List of airports in China
- List of the busiest airports in China
