= Zhantanlin =

Buddhist temple in Anhui, China

- 旃檀林

Religion
- Affiliation: Buddhism
- Sect: Chan Buddhism
- Leadership: Shi Huishen (释慧深)

Location
- Location: Mount Jiuhua, Qingyang County, Anhui
- Country: China
- Interactive map of Zhantanlin
- Coordinates: 30°28′57″N 117°48′30″E

Architecture
- Style: Chinese architecture
- Established: 17th century
- Completed: 1886 (reconstruction)

Zhantanlin (Chinese: 旃檀林; pinyin: Zhāntánlín) is a Buddhist temple located on Mount Jiuhua, in Qingyang County, Anhui, China.

== History ==
The temple was originally in the reign of Kangxi Emperor (1662–1722) in the Qing dynasty (1644–1911). Most of the temple buildings were destroyed in wars during the ruling of Xianfeng Emperor (1851–1861). In 1886, it was restored and redecorated by Chan master Dingchan (定禅).

During the Republic of China, abbot Fuxing (福星) enlarged the temple. A Buddhist laity named Yi Guogan (易国干) presented a plaque with the Chinese characters "福慧双修" to the temple.

In 1983, it has been designated as a National Key Buddhist Temple in Han Chinese Area by the State Council of China.

== Architecture ==
=== Mahavira Hall ===
The Mahavira Hall is 11.5 metres (38 ft) long, 15.5 metres (51 ft) wide and 18 metres (59 ft) high. The Mahavira Hall is the main hall in the temple, enshrining the Three Saints of Hua-yan (华严三圣).

=== Hall of the Three Sages of the West ===
The Hall of the Three Sages of the West (西方三圣殿), for the worship of the Three Sages of the West, namely Guanyin, Amitabha and Mahasthamaprapta, is an important hall in the temple.

=== Hall of Great Compassion ===
The Hall of Great Compassion is 19 metres (62 ft) long, 19 metres (62 ft) wide and 19 metres (62 ft) high. 19 metres represent Guanyin's birth day (19 February), ordination day (19 June) and parinirvana day (19 September).

A statue of Thousand Armed and Eyed Guanyin is enshrined in the middle of the hall with 84 statues of Buddha standing on the left and right sides.
