= Xinghuacun Subdistrict, Chizhou =

Xinghuacun Subdistrict 杏花村街道
- Subdistrict
- Location in China
- Coordinates: 30°39′37″N 117°28′6″E
- Country: People's Republic of China
- Province: Anhui
- Prefecture-level city: Chizhou
- District: Guichi District
- Time zone: UTC+8 (China Standard)

Xinghuacun Subdistrict (Chinese: 杏花村街道; pinyin: Xìnghuācūn Jiēdào) is a subdistrict in Guichi District, Chizhou, Anhui. As of 2020, it administers Xinghuacun Village and the following six residential neighborhoods:

- Chikou (池口)
- Chengxi (城西)
- Shili (十里)
- Kongjing (孔井)
- Changgang (长岗)
- Duwu (杜坞)

== See also ==
- List of township-level divisions of Anhui
