= Wusha =

Wusha may refer to:

- Wusha, Anhui (乌沙; 烏沙; Wūshā), town in Chizhou, Anhui, China
- Wusha, Guizhou (乌沙; 烏沙; Wūshā), town in Xingyi, Guizhou, China
- Sheep Without a Shepherd (误杀; 誤殺; Wùshā), 2019 Chinese film
- Wusha hat (乌纱帽; 烏紗帽; Wūshā mào), Ming dynasty headgear

== See also ==
- Wu Sha (born 1985), Chinese pole vaulter
