= Guangjiao Temple =

Guangjiao Temple (simplified Chinese: 广教寺; traditional Chinese: 廣教寺; pinyin: Guǎngjiào Sì), may refer to:

- Guangjiao Temple (Xuancheng), in Xuancheng, Anhui, China
- Guangjiao Temple (Nantong), in Nantong, Jiangsu, China
