= Mount Jiuhua =

Buddhist mountain in Chizhou, Anhui Province, China

Coordinates: 30°28′56″N 117°48′16″E

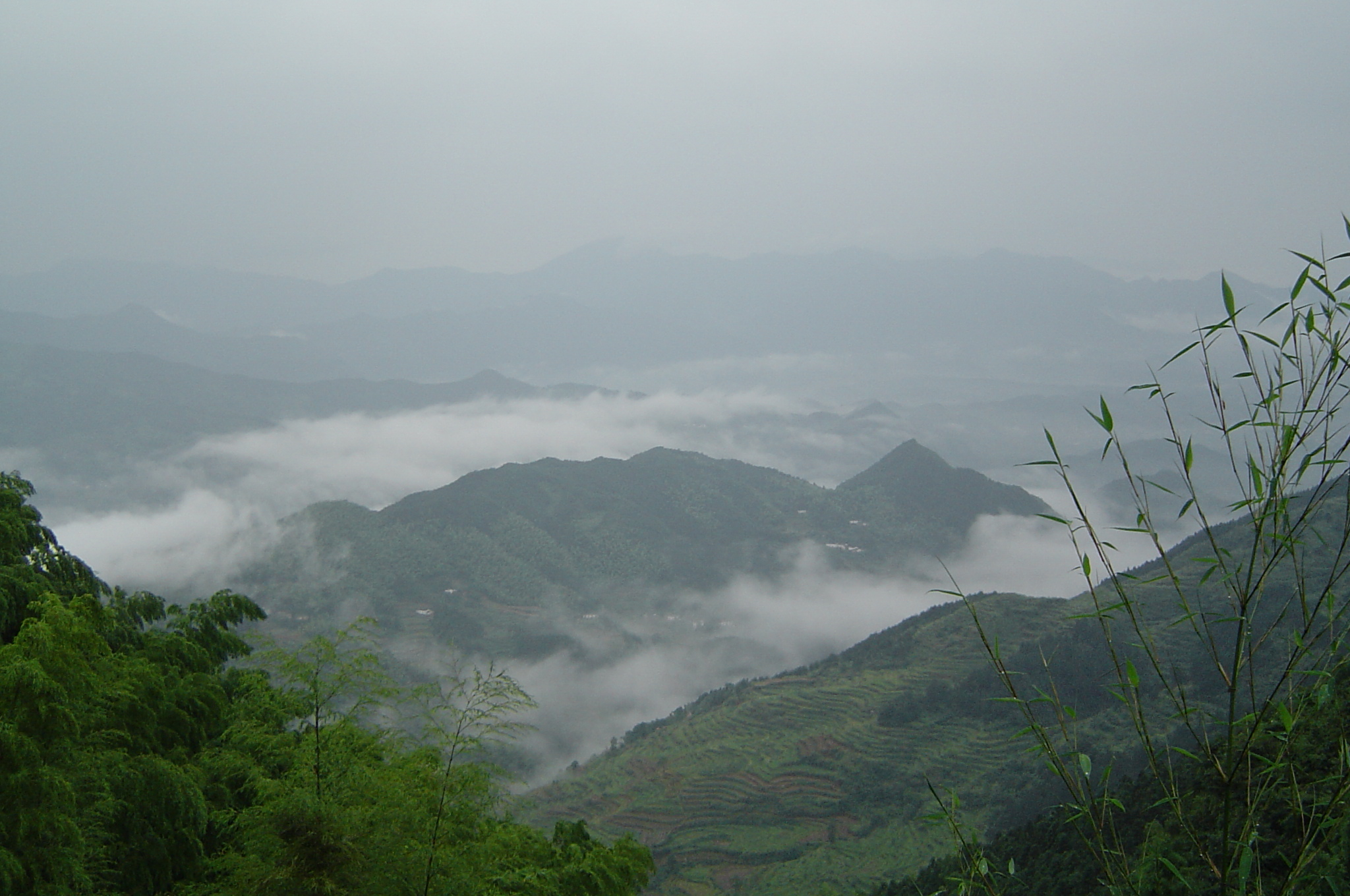
- A view from Jiuhuashan's Lesser Tiantai peak

Geography

Mount Jiuhua (simplified Chinese: 九华山; traditional Chinese: 九華山; pinyin: Jǐuhuá Shān; lit. 'Nine Glorious Mountains') located in Chizhou, Anhui Province in China is an important Buddhist site and natural scenic spot. It is one of the four famous Buddhist mountains in China, one of the first batch of 5A level scenic spots in China, one of the first batch of natural and cultural heritage sites in China, and the main scenic spot of "two mountains and one lake" (Jiuhua Mountain, Taiping Lake, Huangshan) tourism development strategy in Anhui Province. The planned area of the scenic spot is 120 square kilometers, and the protected area is 174 square kilometers, which is composed of 11 scenic spots.

== History ==
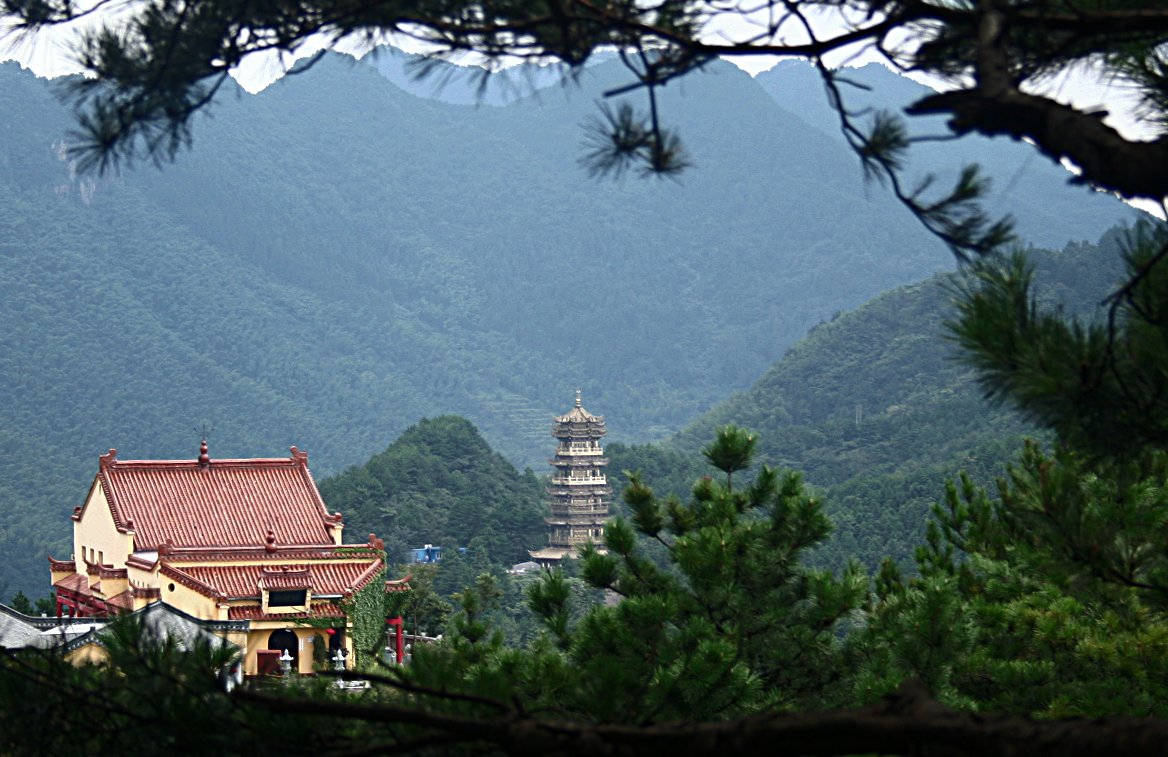
Temples at Mount Jiuhua

Mount Jiuhua was called Mount Lingyang during the time of the Han dynasty. It was called Mount Jiuzi (九子山) during the Liang and Chen dynasties of the South Dynasties period. A legend says that the great poet Li Bai of the Tang dynasty travelled here and wrote "Magic is divided to two branches, sacred mountain generates nine glories." (妙有分二气，灵山开九华), giving rise to its name Mount Jiuhua.

Mount Jiuhua is located in the southeastern part of Chizhou City, in Qingyang County of Anhui Province. The gross area reaches 120 square kilometers, while the protection area reaches 114 square kilometers. Shiwang Peak is the highest one with an elevation of 1342 meters above sea level. Together with Wutai Mountain in Shanxi, Emei Mountain in Sichuan and Putuo Mountain in Zhejiang. Jiuhua Mountain is called one of the four great Buddhist mountains in China. In 719 AD, Kim Qiaoque, a Silla prince (today's Qingzhou city in South Korea) who was ordained as a bhikkhu came to Jiuhua Mountain and cultivated himself for 75 years. He died at 99 years of age, his corporeal body stayed intact as sacred relic. Because he was very similar in appearance to Dizang Bodhisattva, the monastic community there believed he is one of the incarnations of Dizang Bodhisattva, as a result, Jiuhua Mountain became the sacred site dedicated to Dizang Bodhisattva. During the golden periods of the Ming and Qing dynasties, there were as many as 360 temples and 4,000 to 5,000 monks and nuns. The mountain is not only famous for its Buddhist culture but also noted for its natural landscapes featuring old pines, green bamboo forests, strange rocks, waterfalls, streams and caves.

Mount Jiuhua was originally known as Jiuzi (Nine-Peak) Mountain. But ever since Li Bai, the Tang dynasty poet, wrote of the mountain,

Sailing down the Jiujiang River the other day, I saw the Jiuhua Peaks in the distance. Looking like a heavenly river hanging in heaven, Its green water embroidering cotton rose hibiscuses.

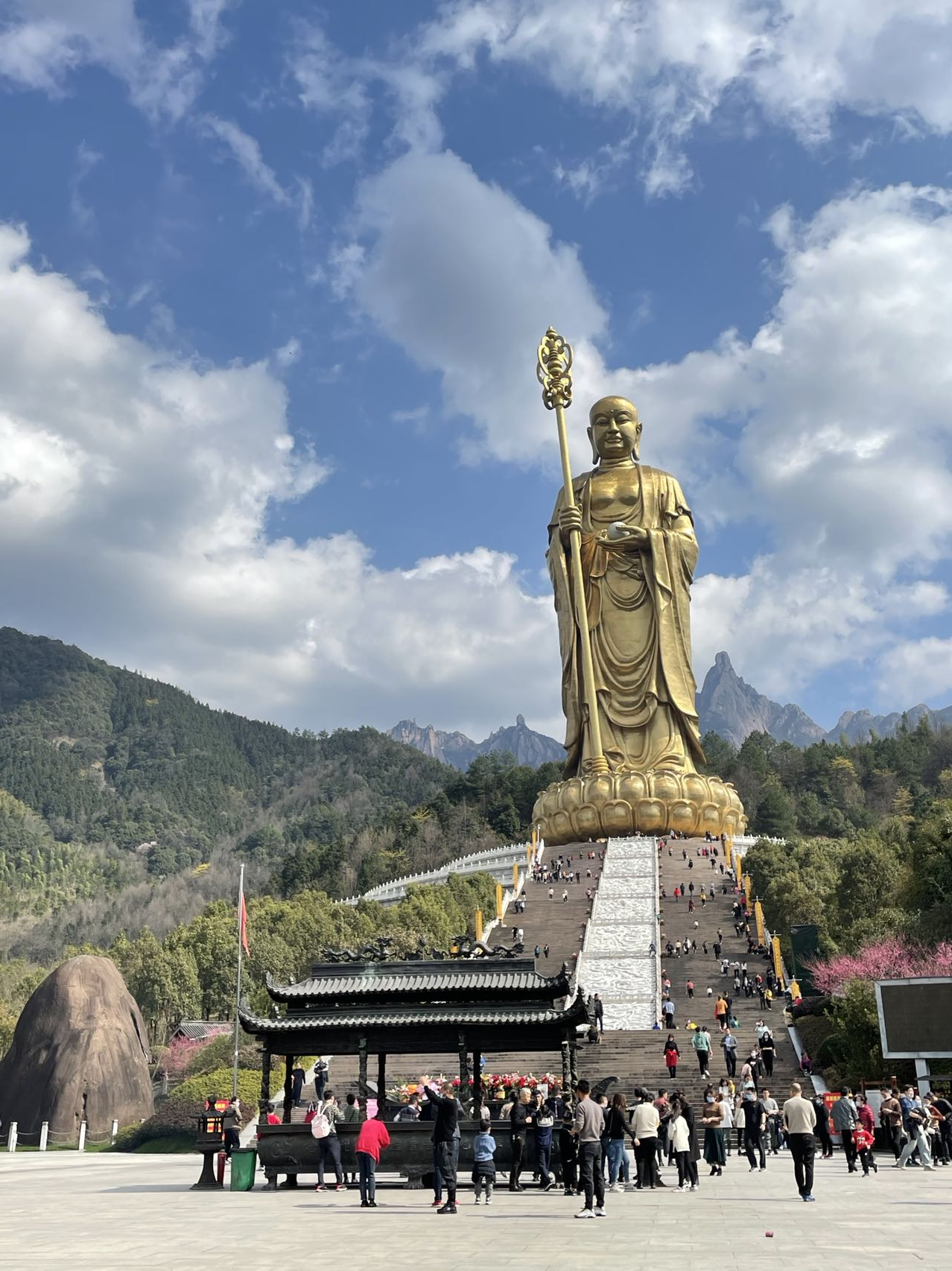
A view of the 109.9-meter tall statue of Ksitigarbha Bodhisattva at Jiuhuashan

the mountain was renamed Jiuhua Mountain. As a popular pilgrimage destination, it was very famous in the southeastern part of China and became one of the four holy mountains of Buddhism. Since its opening in 1979, Jiuhua Mountain, with its abundant Buddhist culture and uniquely attractive scenery, has enjoyed a high reputation in southeast Asia, South Korea and Japan. It is known as the mountain and bodhimaṇḍa of Dizang Bodhisattva and for having a large number of sacred Buddhist relics, including a 109.9 m (361 ft) tall statue of Dizang. There are 99 peaks in the area, among them Shiwang Peak, Lotus Peak, and others.

Subsequently certified as a national geopark, and then as a regional geopark (Asia Pacific Geopark Network), it was admitted as a UNESCO Global Geopark in 2019.

== Climate ==
Climate data for Mount Jiuhua, elevation 647 m (2,123 ft), (1991–2020 normals)
Month	Jan	Feb	Mar	Apr	May	Jun	Jul	Aug	Sep	Oct	Nov	Dec	Year
Mean daily maximum °C (°F)	5.4 (41.7)	8.3 (46.9)	13.2 (55.8)	19.3 (66.7)	23.7 (74.7)	26.0 (78.8)	29.3 (84.7)	28.4 (83.1)	24.3 (75.7)	19.7 (67.5)	14.3 (57.7)	8.3 (46.9)	18.4 (65.0)
Daily mean °C (°F)	1.6 (34.9)	4.2 (39.6)	8.7 (47.7)	14.8 (58.6)	19.4 (66.9)	22.5 (72.5)	25.8 (78.4)	24.8 (76.6)	20.7 (69.3)	15.7 (60.3)	10.0 (50.0)	4.0 (39.2)	14.4 (57.8)
Mean daily minimum °C (°F)	−1.0 (30.2)	1.4 (34.5)	5.3 (41.5)	11.1 (52.0)	16.0 (60.8)	19.6 (67.3)	23.1 (73.6)	22.0 (71.6)	17.9 (64.2)	12.7 (54.9)	7.1 (44.8)	1.3 (34.3)	11.4 (52.5)
Average precipitation mm (inches)	102.6 (4.04)	106.6 (4.20)	173.0 (6.81)	194.5 (7.66)	219.7 (8.65)	315.7 (12.43)	305.5 (12.03)	289.3 (11.39)	143.2 (5.64)	110.9 (4.37)	97.0 (3.82)	76.6 (3.02)	2,134.6 (84.06)
Average precipitation days (≥ 0.1 mm)	13.2	13.7	16.2	15.6	15.0	16.6	15.4	17.4	12.7	10.8	11.5	10.9	169
Average snowy days	7.8	4.9	2.4	0.1	0	0	0	0	0	0	0.6	3.7	19.5
Average relative humidity (%)	76	76	73	72	74	81	78	82	82	74	73	70	76
Mean monthly sunshine hours	103.1	101.7	121.1	142.9	156.4	122.2	174.8	156.2	134.2	148.4	130.6	129.6	1,621.2
Percentage possible sunshine	32	32	33	37	37	29	41	39	37	42	41	41	37
Source: China Meteorological Administration

== Temples ==
Some renowned temples located at Mount Jiuhua include:

- Ganlu Temple (Mount Jiuhua)
- Tiantai Temple (Mount Jiuhua)
- Zhiyuan Temple (Mount Jiuhua)
- Huacheng Temple
- Baisui Palace
- Zhantalin
- Baisuigong Temple
- Qiyuansi Temple
- Roushen Temple
- Tianchi Temple
- Dabeilou Temple

== Gallery ==
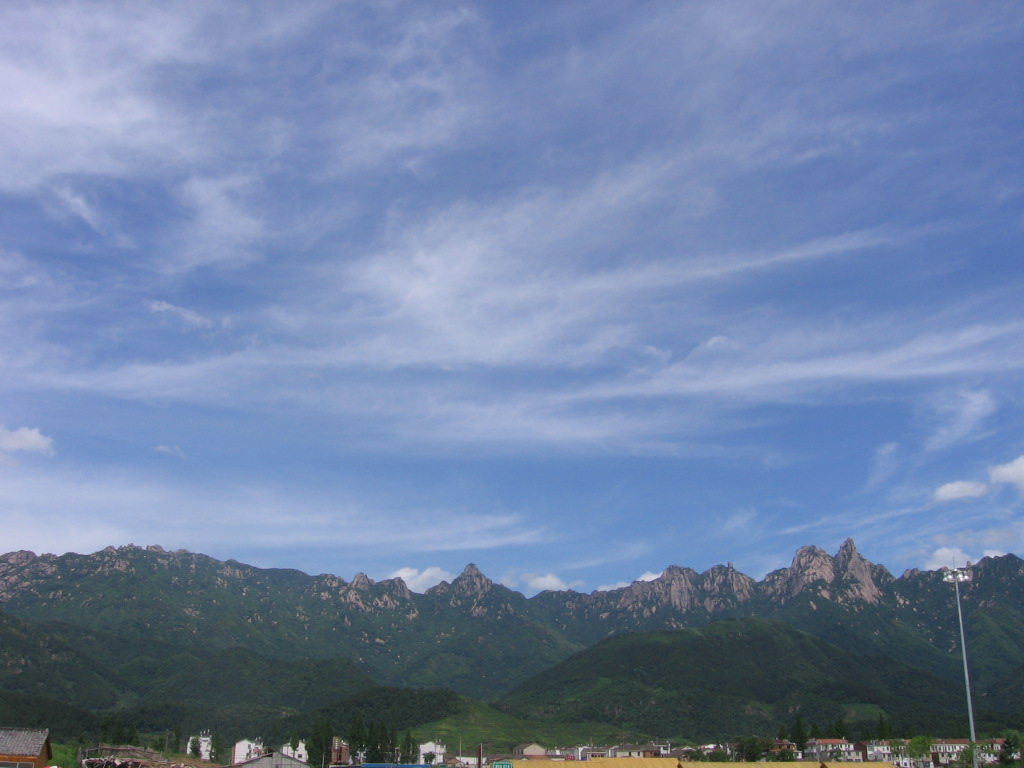
A view of China's Jiuhuashan (mountains), seen from a distance.

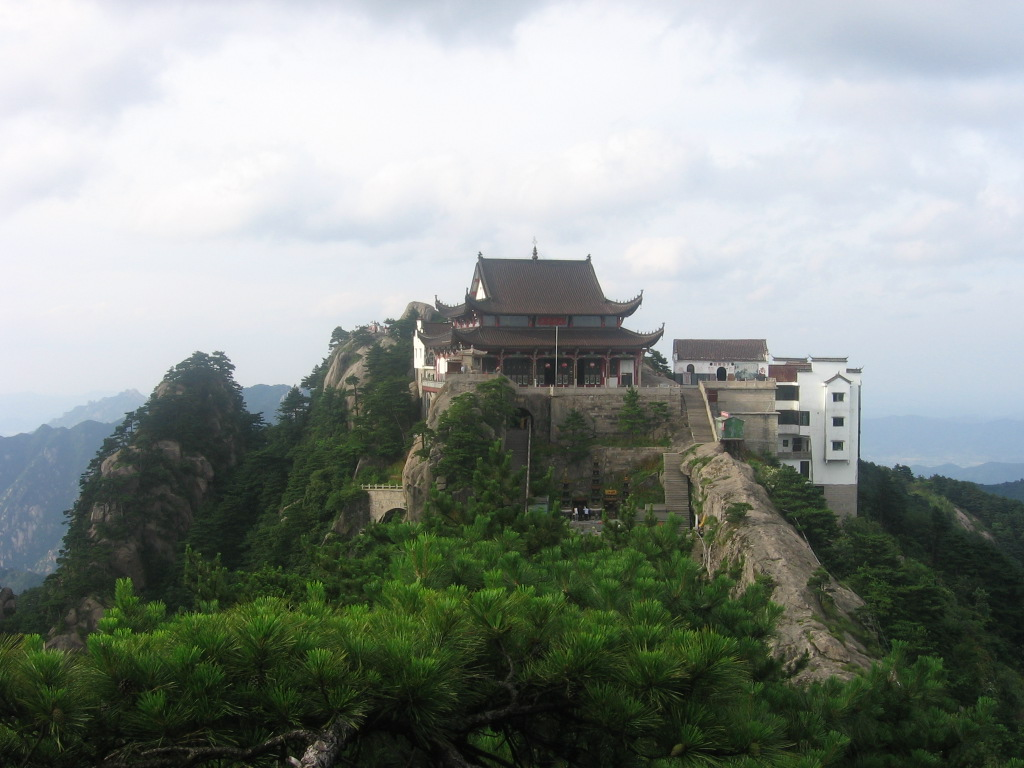
Higher Daxiong Baodian, located on Greater Tiantai peak

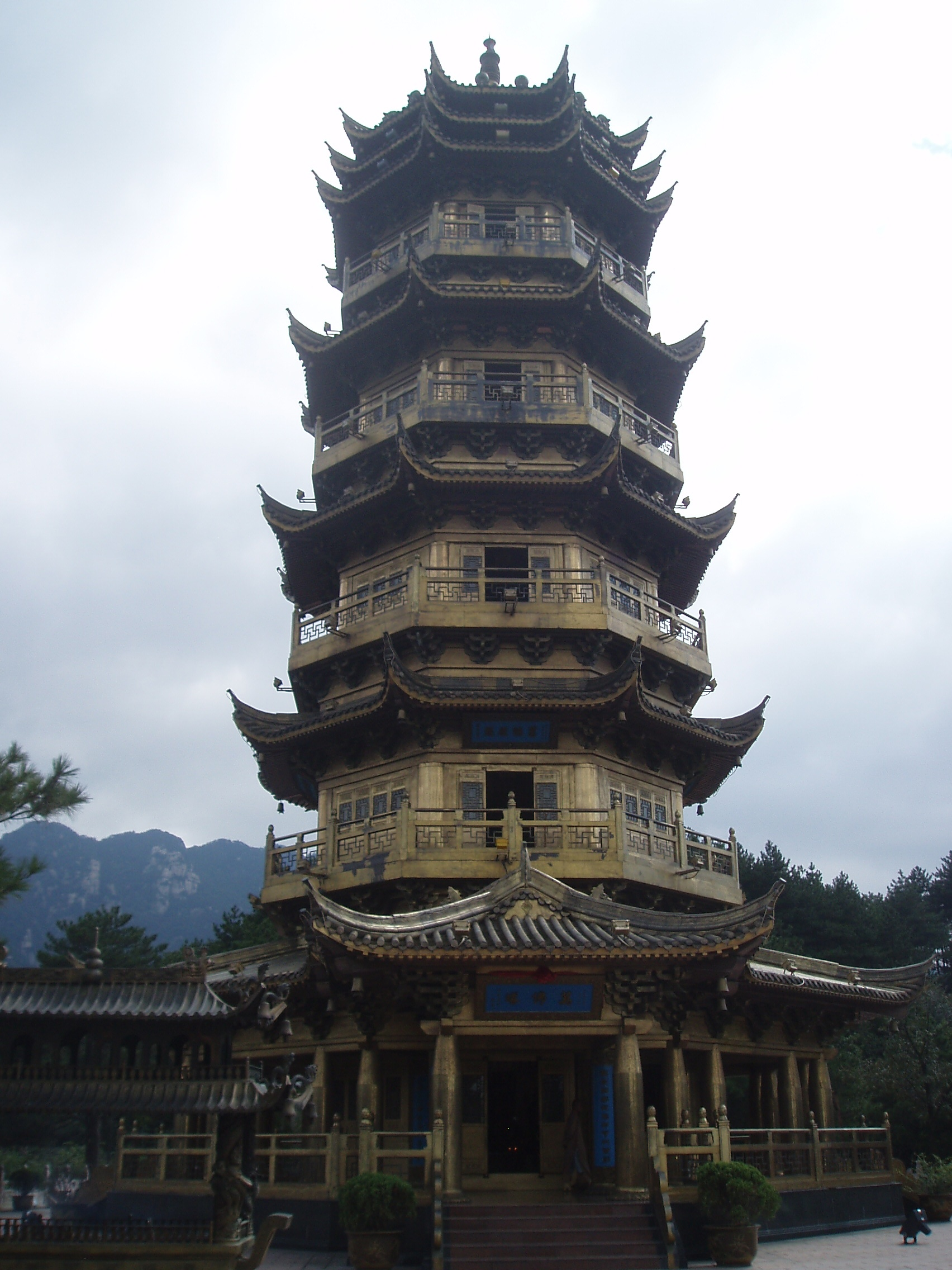
Wanfo Pagoda at Mount Jiuhua

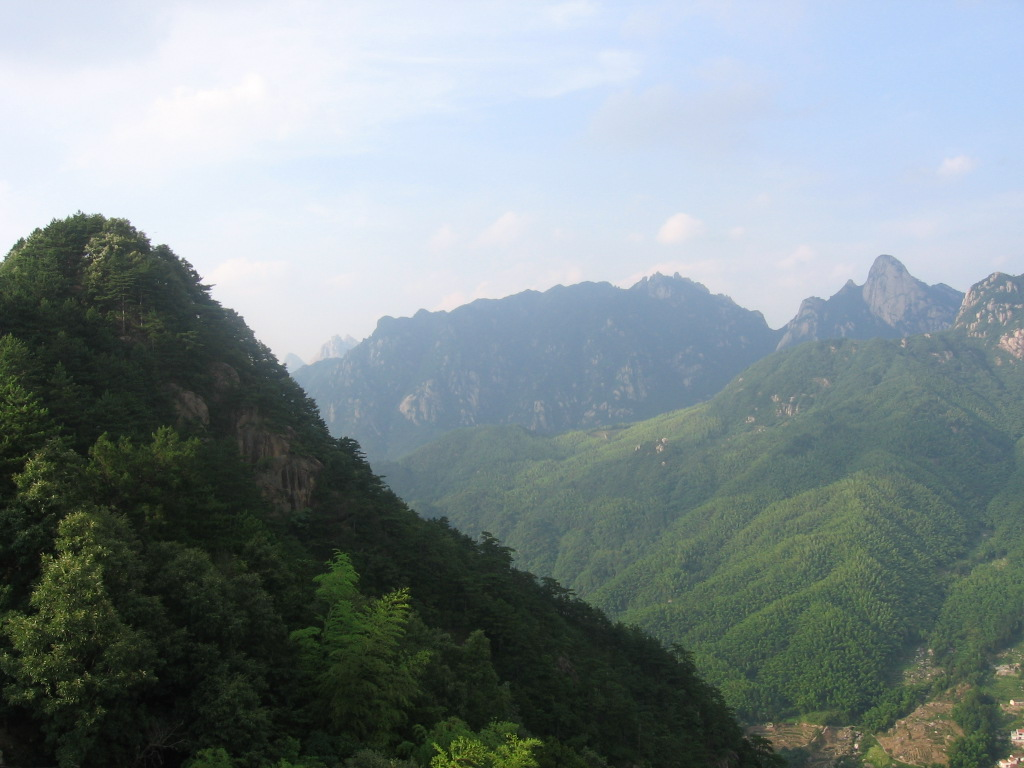
China's Jiuhuashan (mountains): a view of multiple peaks, seen from Dizang Dian (temple).
