= Qiupu =

Qiupu 秋浦
- Subdistrict
- 秋浦街道
- Interactive map of Qiupu
- Coordinates: 30°39′15″N 117°29′0″E
- Country: People's Republic of China
- Province: Anhui
- Prefecture-level city: Chizhou
- District: Guichi District
- Subdistrict: Qiupu
- Time zone: UTC+8 (China Standard)

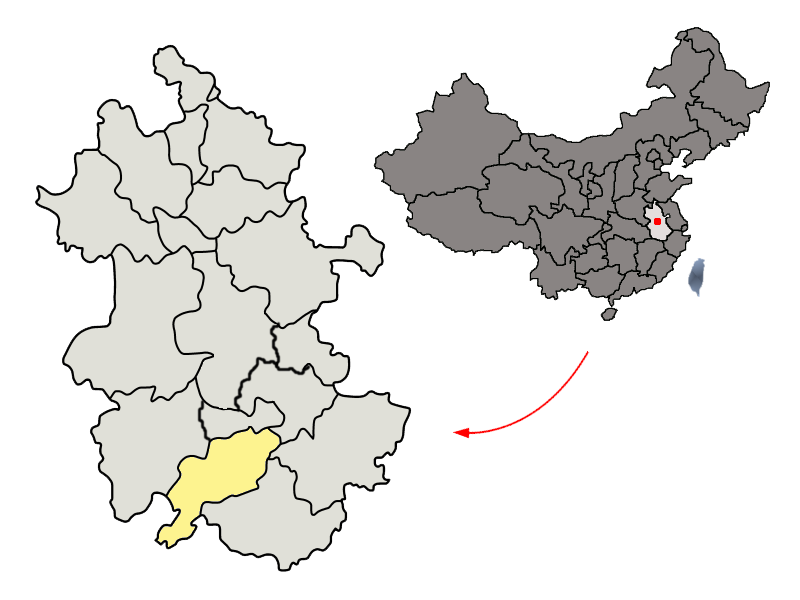
Location of modern Chizhou Prefecture within Anhui (China), which is somewhat coterminous with historical Qiupu

Qiupu (Chinese: 秋浦; pinyin: Qiūpǔ; Wade–Giles: Chiupu) is a small subdistrict of Chizhou city in southcentral Anhui province, China. Qiupu was described as a beautiful small city by cinematographer Sun Yu, in the early 1980s. It has existed at least since the Tang dynasty, when it was part of Chizhou Prefecture. The proximity of the Yangzi river has provided convenient transportation by water. In modern times, the subdistrict is one of the smaller political divisions of the People's Republic of China: a form of township-level division, which are typically parts of larger urban areas, opposed to discrete towns surrounded by rural areas, or to rural townships. Caution is indicated when comparing current and past Chinese populated areas: even with the same name, sometimes locations or political status have gone through significant changes. That said, Qiupu has a place in cultural history which may be greater than its current administrative status. As of 2014, Qiupu is part of the Guichi District (population 630,000), which is in turn administered by Chizhou, Anhui province of China.

== History and culture ==
Map showing the location of the kingdom of Lu, during the ancient times of the 5th century BCE, in the south of the Shandong peninsula

In ancient history, Qiupu was a part of the Lu feudal kingdom, associated with the relatively modern province of Shandong and the more modern province of Anhui (which was not organized until the 17th century). Both of these areas are partially located on the eastern edge of the North China Plain, and Chinese culture has been part of these areas since remote antiquity. The Shang dynasty and the more westerly-originated Zhou dynasty exerted varying degrees of political control and cultural influence, especially over the western Shandong area; and, also, especially eastern Shandong was influenced by the Dongyi/Laiyi inhabitants. The general area was famous for being the location of the tomb of Emperor Yao; and, the Lu state was famous as the homeland of Confucius (and infamous for the Lu rulers' rejection of his talent and potential services). Besides the Shang refugees, and the Zhou cadet rulership, the area was (probably among others, and for others) a refuge for persons or peoples displaced from the Chu state.

The Tang dynasty poet Li Bo visited Qiupu numerous times, in his mid-to-late life. He wrote a series of 17 poems, Qiupu Songs (秋浦歌), and other of his survive which are less-specifically located from within its general area. In these songs, or poems, he described the beautiful natural scenes of hills, woods, and streams; and also the workers in the local metallurgic industry. Some of his sadness from his wandering life-style also comes through, in these poems. Li Bo's poems also attest to the existence of numerous members of some simian species (probably white gibbons) populating the area at that time.

== Geography ==
Qiupu is known historically known for its scenic topography. And, also known for having been connected by water transport to the extensive Yangzi riverine system, one of the world's longest, running between western China and the Pacific Ocean, and navigable for much of the distance. Qiupu has also been of a reasonable travel distance from the North China Plain. Eventually, the Sui dynasty (581–618 CE) construction of the Grand Canal of China greatly impacted north–south land transport which was conducted despite the mountains and hills separating north and south.

== See also ==
- Li Bo, also known as Li Po and Li Bai
- Monkeys in Chinese culture
- Simians (Chinese poetry)
- List of township-level divisions of Anhui
