= Tiantai Temple (Mount Jiuhua) =

Buddhist temple in Anhui, China

- 天台寺
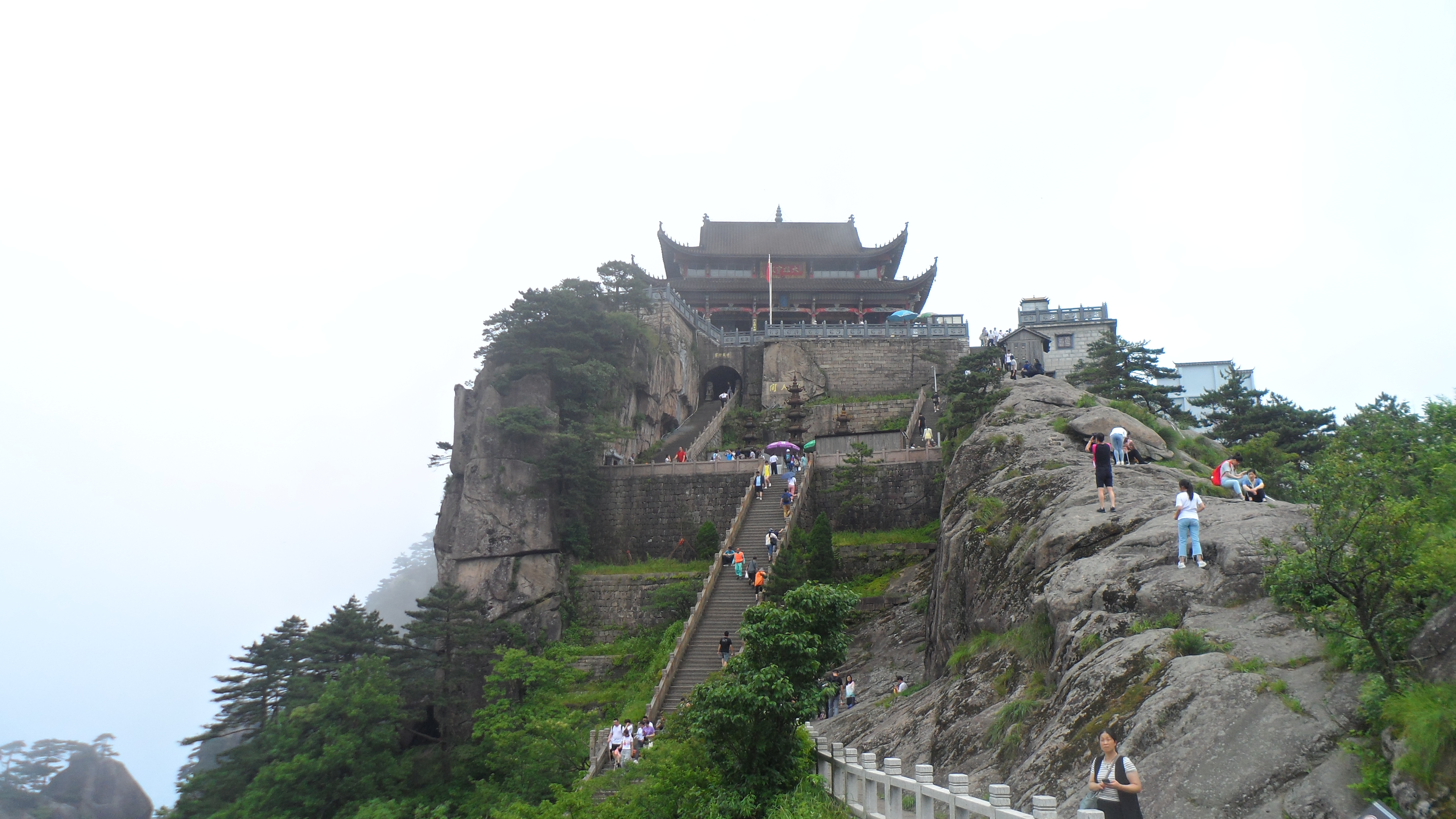

Religion
- Affiliation: Buddhism
- Sect: Chan Buddhism

Location
- Location: Mount Jiuhua, Qingyang County, Anhui
- Country: China
- Interactive map of Tiantai Temple
- Coordinates: 30°34′21″N 117°46′36″E

Architecture
- Style: Chinese architecture
- Founder: Zhaolian (昭莲)
- Established: 1368
- Completed: 1890 (reconstruction)

Tiantai Temple (simplified Chinese: 天台寺; traditional Chinese: 天臺寺; pinyin: Tiāntaí Sì), also known as the Temple of Ksitigarbha (地藏寺), is the highest Buddhist temple dedicated to Ksitigarbha located on Mount Jiuhua, in Qingyang County, Anhui, China. It was first built in the Tang dynasty (618–907), and went through many changes and renovations through the following dynasties. Most of the present structures in the temple were repaired or built in the late Qing dynasty (1644–1911).

== History ==
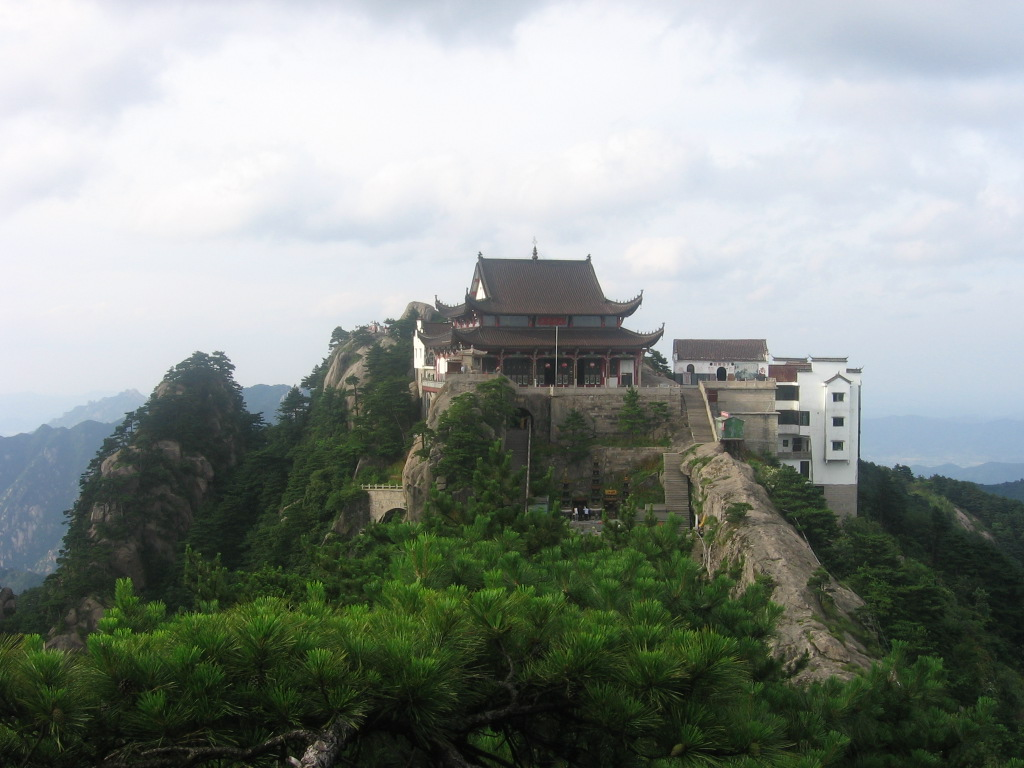
A frontal view of Tiantai Temple.

=== Tang dynasty ===
The original temple dates back to the Tang dynasty (618–907), while Kim Gyo-gak resided in here, where he promulgated Buddhist sutras.

=== Ming dynasty ===
The temple was first built by monk Zhaolian (昭莲) in 1368, at the dawn of Ming dynasty (1368–1644).

=== Qing dynasty ===
In 1720, in the reign of Kangxi Emperor (1662–1722) in the Qing dynasty (1644–1911), monk Chenchenzi (尘尘子) settled at the temple and named it "Huomai'an" (活埋庵). The modern temple was founded in 1890, in the ruling of Guangxu Emperor (1875–1908).

=== Republic of China ===
In 1920 abbot Chede (彻德) raised funds to build a main hall. Abbot Lantian (兰田) supervised the construction of stone road in the following year. The temple had reached unprecedented heyday between 1936 and 1949, under the leadership of abbot Yifang (义方).

=== People's Republic of China ===
After the establishment of the Communist State in 1949, a modern restoration of the entire temple complex was carried out in 1953 by the Qingyang County Government.

Tiantai Temple has been designated as a National Key Buddhist Temple in Han Chinese Area by the State Council of China in 1983.

== Architecture ==
The existing main buildings include the Shanmen, Four Heavenly Kings Hall, Mahavira Hall, Hall of Guanyin, Dharma Hall, Meditation Hall, and Reception Hall.

== Tourism ==
Tiantai temple is a popular destination for Chinese Buddhists wishing for prosperity and auspiciousness in the Chinese New Year. A cable car runs up the mountain and buses run from the Tiantai Scenic Area Bus Stop in Jiuhua township.
