= Guangjiao Temple (Xuancheng) =

Buddhist temple in Xuancheng, China

- 广教寺
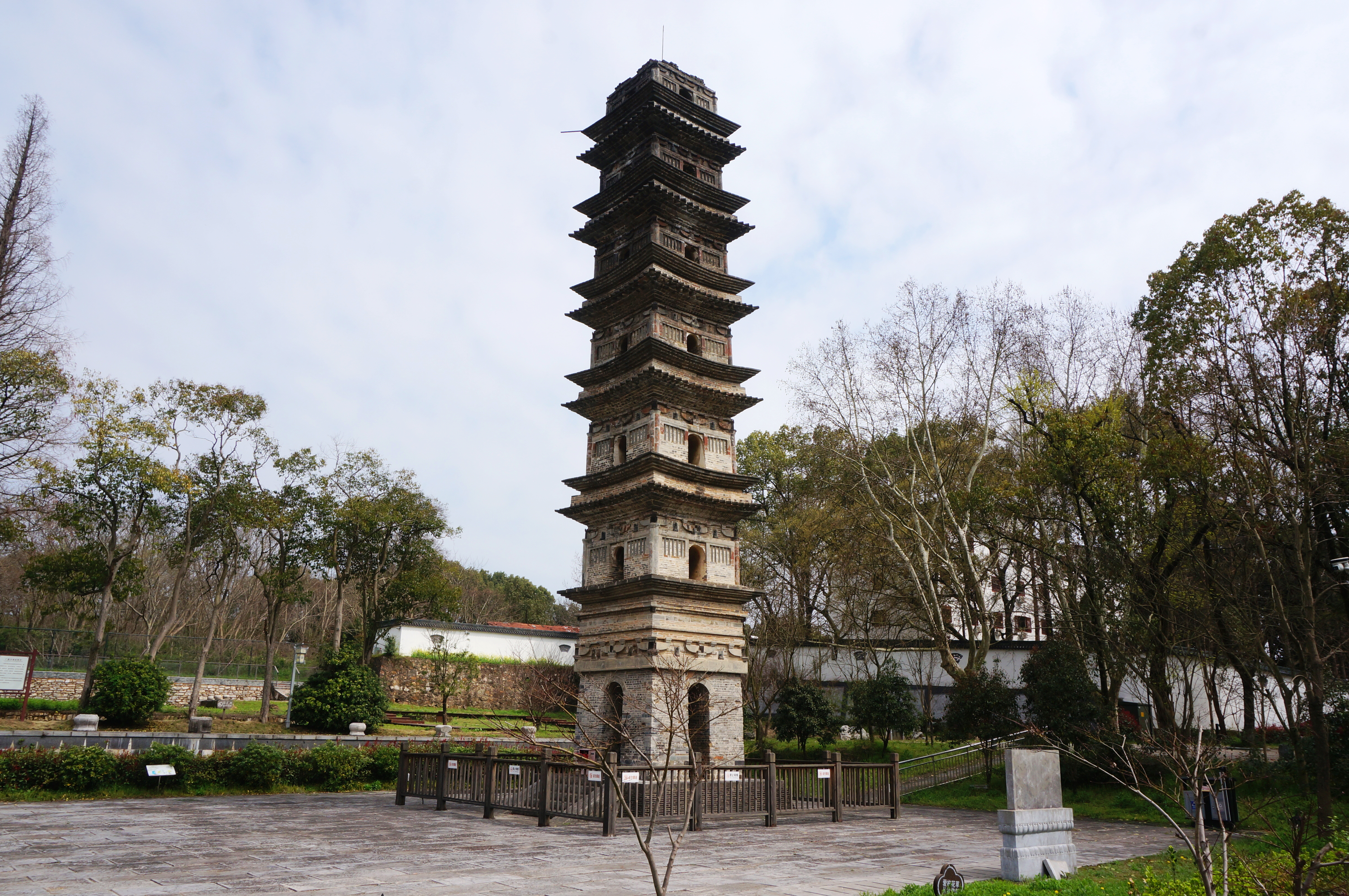
- The east pagoda of the twin pagodas of Guangjiao Temple in Xuancheng, on the southwest side.

- Location within China

Religion
- Affiliation: Buddhism
- Deity: Chan Buddhism

Location
- Location: Xuanzhou District, Xuancheng, Anhui
- Country: China
- Interactive map of Guangjiao Temple
- Coordinates: 30°58′20″N 118°45′24″E

Architecture
- Style: Chinese architecture
- Founder: Huangbo Xiyun
- Established: 849
- Completed: 2006 (reconstruction)

Guangjiao Temple (simplified Chinese: 广教寺; traditional Chinese: 廣教寺; pinyin: Guǎngjiào Sì) is a Buddhist temple located in Xuanzhou District, Xuancheng, Anhui, China. Alongside Huacheng Temple, Cuifeng Temple and Kaihua Temple, it is honoured as the "Four Famous Buddhist Temples in Anhui". It was first built in the Tang dynasty by a prominent Chan master Huangbo Xiyun, and went through many changes and repairs through the following dynasties. Most of the present structures in the temple were repaired or rebuilt between 2004 and 2006.

== History ==
The temple was built by an accomplished Chan master Huangbo Xiyun in 849 in the region of Emperor Xuanzong of the Tang dynasty (618–907).

In the reign of Emperor Taizong (976–997) of the Song dynasty (960–1279), the emperor gave a set of Buddhist sutras to the temple. Mei Yaochen and Su Shi paid religious homage to the temple.

In the Kangxi period (1662–1722) of the Qing dynasty (1644–1911), Shitao resided in Guangjiao Temple, where he preached Buddhism and drew paintings.

In 1937, after the Marco Polo Bridge Incident, the Second Sino-Japanese War broke out, Guangjiao Temple was completely destroyed in the war with only the Twin Pagodas remaining.

Reconstruction of Guangjiao Temple commenced in 2004 and was completed in 2006.

== Architecture ==
Guangjiao Temple occupies a building area of 20,000 square metres (220,000 sq ft) and the total area including temple lands, forests and mountains is over 86,000 square metres (930,000 sq ft). The extant buildings include the Shanmen, Four Heavenly Kings Hall, Mahavira Hall, Hall of Ksitigarbha, Drum tower, Bell tower, Buddhist Texts Library and two pagodas.

=== Twin Pagodas ===
The Twin Pagodas (双塔) were first built in 1096 under the Song dynasty and underwent two renovations, respectively in 1989 and 2014. In 1956, the Twin Pagodas were inscribed as provincial key cultural units by the Anhui Provincial Government. In January 1988, the Twin Pagodas were listed among the third batch of "Major National Historical and Cultural Sites in Anhui" by the State Council of China.

The seven-story, 17-metre-tall (56 ft), tetragonal-based Twin Pagodas are made of brick and stone.
