= Zhiyuan Temple (Mount Jiuhua) =

Buddhist temple on Mount Jiuhua, China

- 祗园寺
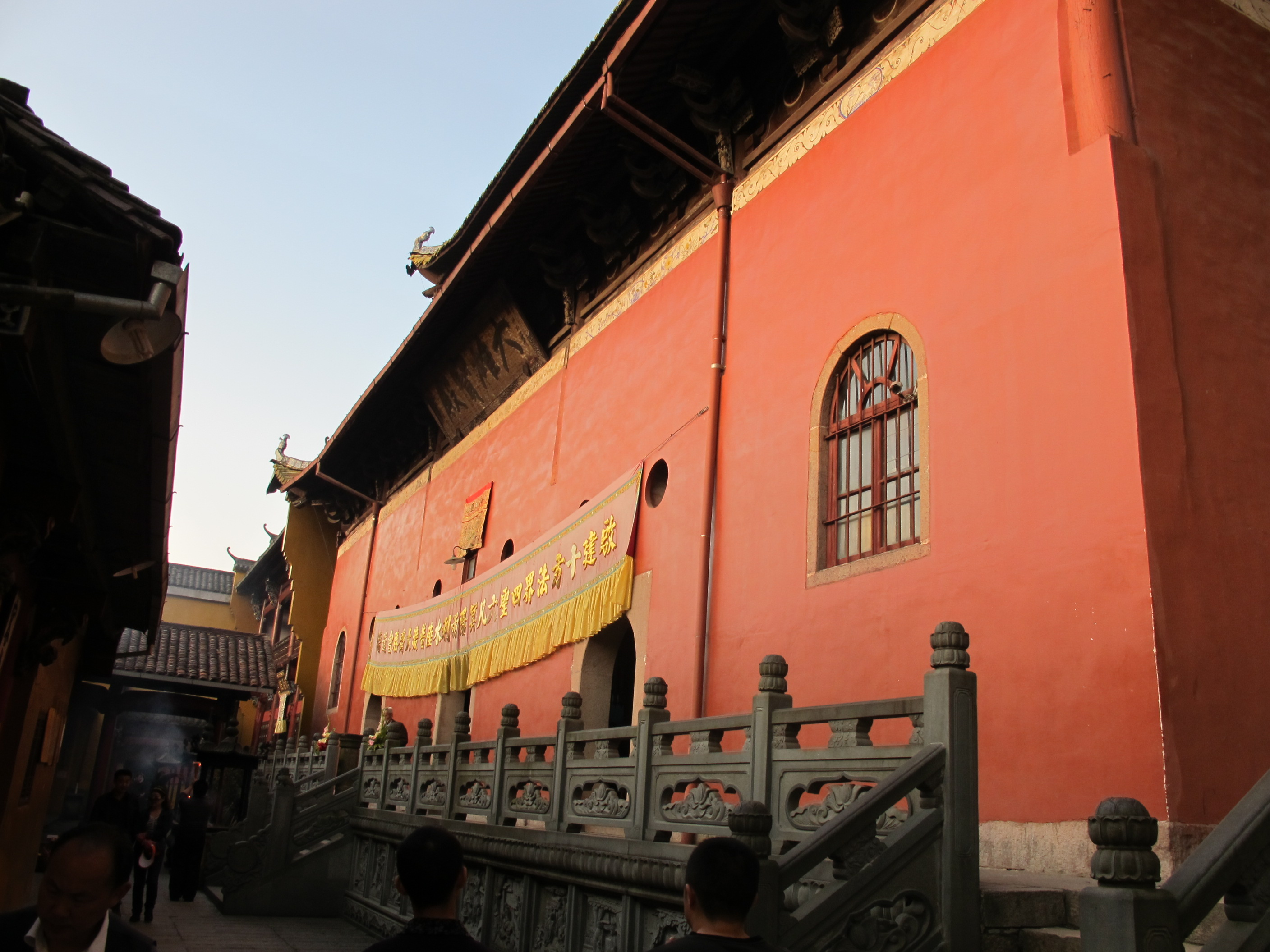
- The Mahavira Hall at Zhiyuan Temple

Religion
- Affiliation: Buddhism

Location
- Location: Mount Jiuhua, Qingyang County, Anhui
- Country: China
- Interactive map of Zhiyuan Temple
- Coordinates: 30°29′31″N 117°48′15″E

Architecture
- Style: Chinese architecture
- Established: Jiajing period (1522–1566)

Zhiyuan Temple (simplified Chinese: 祗园寺; traditional Chinese: 祗園寺; pinyin: Zhīyuán Sì) is a Buddhist temple located on Mount Jiuhua, in Qingyang County, Anhui, China. Alongside Ganlu Temple, Baisui Palace and Dongyan Chan Temple are honoured as the "Four Buddhist Temple on Mount Jiuhua".

== Name ==
The name of the temple is cited from Buddhist Stories, which says that Gautama Buddha resided in a monastery named "Zhiyuan" (祗园) or "Guduyuan" (孤独园) or Jetavana for over twenty years.

== History ==
Zhiyuan Temple was first built in the Jiajing period (1522–1566) of the Ming dynasty (1368–1644), and went through many changes and repairs through the following Qing dynasty (1644–1911). Most of the present structures in the temple were repaired or built in the Qing dynasty. In 1841, during the reign of Daoguang Emperor (1840–1850) in the Qing dynasty, abbot Longshan (隆山) died. His body became a mummy but was destroyed by the Red Guards in the Cultural Revolution.

The temple was originally named "Zhishu'an" (祗树庵) and renamed "Zhiyuan Temple" after the extension under the leadership of monk Dagen (大根).

Zhiyuan Temple has been designated as a National Key Buddhist Temple in Han Chinese Area by the State Council of China in 1983. On October 28, 2014, it was classified as a municipal cultural unit by the local government.

== Architecture ==
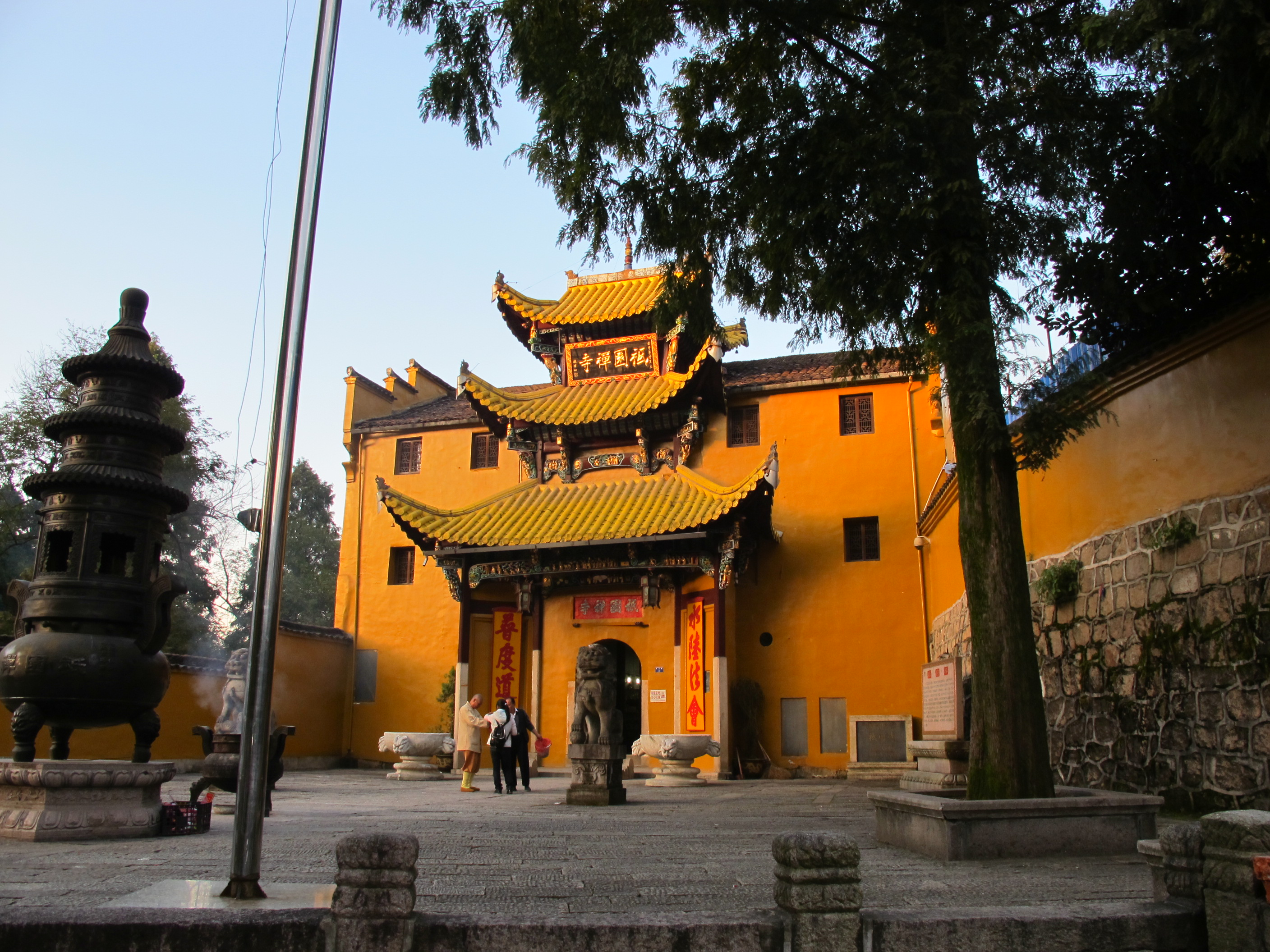
The Shanmen at Zhiyuan Temple.

The existing main buildings include the Shanmen, Tianwang Hall, Daxiongbao Hall, Lingguan Hall, Mi Le (Maitreya) Hall, Reception Hall, Dining Hall, and Abbot's Room.

=== Shanmen ===
The Shanmen is flush threefold story gable roof style (三层硬山顶). Statues of Heng and Ha and Lord Lingguan (灵官) are enshrined in the hall.

=== Tianwang Hall ===
The Tianwang Hall has a double-eave gable and hip roof (重檐歇山顶). Statues of Four Heavenly Kings are housed in the hall.

=== Daxiongbao Hall ===
The Daxiongbao Hall is the main and third hall in the temple. It has a double-eave gable and hip roof (重檐歇山顶) covered with yellow glazed tiles, which symbolize a high level in architecture because yellow was the symbol of the royal family.

The hall houses three gilded copper statues of three Buddha, namely Shijiamounifo (Sakyamuni), Amituofo (Amitabha) and Yaoshi Fo (Bhaisajyaguru). They have an average height of about 7 metres (23 ft), which is the highest statues on Mount Jiuhua. The statue of Guanyin is placed at the back of the three statues. The statues of Eighteen Arhats stand on both sides of the hall.

== Cultural relics ==
The temple's kitchen keeps seven bronze cauldrons, the largest having 173 centimetres (68 in) in diameter and 56 centimetres (22 in) in height, which are known as "thousand monks cauldrons" (千僧灶) for its capacity of cooking 200 kilograms (440 lb) of rice each time.

The Cangjing Ge has the only Tripitaka (龙藏) collection in Chinese printed by the Qing imperial court and 1,669 other Tripitaka books.
