= Huacheng Temple =

Oldest Buddhist temple on Mount Jiuhua, China

- 化城寺
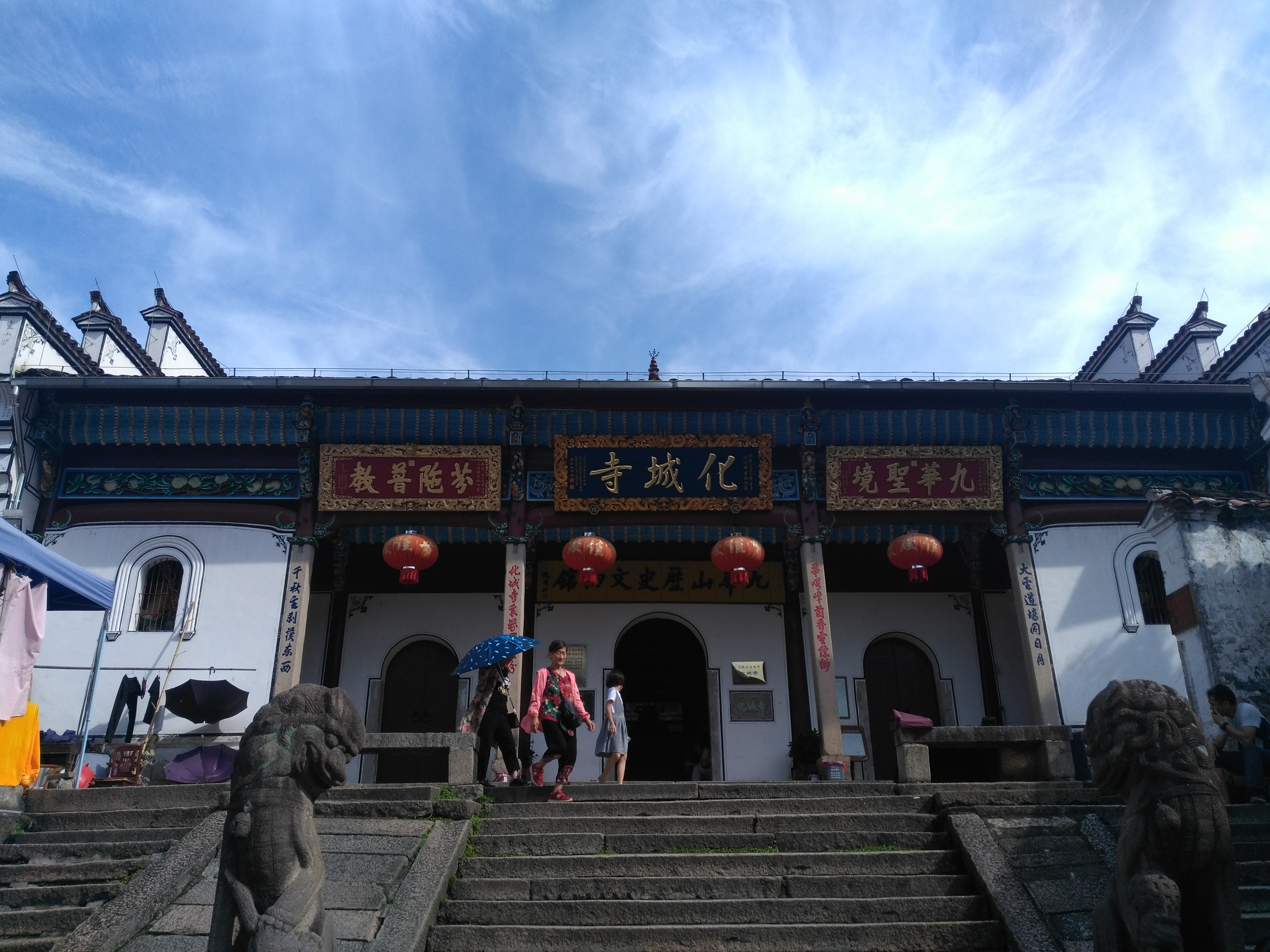
- Huacheng Temple

Religion
- Affiliation: Buddhism

Location
- Location: Mount Jiuhua, Qingyang County, Anhui
- Country: China
- Interactive map of Huacheng Temple
- Coordinates: 30°29′04″N 117°48′32″E

Architecture
- Style: Chinese architecture
- Founder: Huaidu
- Established: 401
- Completed: Qing dynasty (reconstruction)

Huacheng Temple (Chinese: 化城寺; pinyin: Huàchéng Sì) is the oldest and most prominent temple on Mount Jiuhua, Qingyang County, Anhui Province, China. It has a history of more than 1,500 years.

== History ==
=== Jin dynasty ===
Huacheng Temple is the first temple and also the leading temple on Mount Jiuhua. It is said that in 401 CE during the Jin dynasty (266–420), an Indian monk Huaidu (怀渡) built a small Buddhist temple here.

=== Tang dynasty ===
During the Kaiyuan era of the Tang dynasty (618–907), a monk Tanhao (檀号) was in charge and called it "Huacheng". In 781 CE, the governor of Chizhou, Zhang Yan (张岩), got approval from the central government, and moved the old board "Huacheng" to this temple. In 794 CE, Jin Qiaojue died at 99, and fellow monks regarded him as the incarnation of the Bodhisattva Ksitigarbha. Ever since Huacheng Temple was dedicated to Ksitigarbha.

=== Song dynasty ===
In the late Southern Song dynasty (1127–1279), the abbot was Guangzong (广宗), later called Guangchuan monk.

=== Yuan dynasty ===
In 1321 during the Yuan dynasty (1271–1368), the abbot was Zhenguan (真观), later called Wuxiang monk.

=== Ming dynasty ===
In 1391 during the Ming dynasty (1368–1644), the abbots Zongling (宗琳) and Fajian (法鉴) expanded it to a Chan Buddhist temple. In 1435, monk Fuqing (福庆) of Linggu Temple in Nanjing moved to Mount Jiuhua to preside over Huacheng Temple due to his old age. He rebuilt Grand Hall of the Great Sage, Cangjing, Zushi, Jingang, Tianwang and Jialan Halls, and also expanded Eastern Halls. In the Zhengtong era of the Ming dynasty, the abbots Daotai (道泰), and later Dugang (都冈), Fayan (法演), Faguang (法广) expanded Foge, Fangzhang, Langwu, Dizang Hall and Shijie, forming Western Halls. In 1569, businessman Huang Longding (黄龙鼎) of Anhui donated to rebuild the temple. In 1603, the abbot Liangyuan (量远) went to Beijing and the central government bestowed purple kasaya on him.

=== Qing dynasty ===
In 1681 during the Qing dynasty (1644–1911), the governor of Chizhou, Yu Chenglong (喻成龙), renovated the temple and built "Juhua Pavilion". The temple comprised Eastern and Western Palaces and totaled 72 halls. Thus, Huacheng Temple became the leading temple in Mount Jiuhua, called General Buddhist Temple. From 1703 to 1705, the Kangxi Emperor ordered his close servant to come to Mount Jiuhua to worship the temple three times, making donations and bestowing a board "Superior Place of Jiuhua" (九华圣境). In 1766, it received another board written by the emperor, "Fragrant Grand Temple" (芬陀普教). However, in 1857, the temple was destroyed, and only Sutra Library was left. In 1890, the abbot Lunfa (论法) and pilgrim Liu Hanfang (刘含芳) and others donated to rebuild four halls.

=== Republic of China ===
In 1926, Shi Rongxu (释容虚) founded "Jiangnan Mount Jiuhua Buddhist Academy" here.

=== People's Republic of China ===
The government of Qinyang County renovated the temple in 1955. But in 1968, all the Buddhist images were destroyed. In 1981, the temple was rebuilt, and Mount Jiuhua Historical and Cultural Museum was opened. The preserved collection of more than 1,800 pieces was on exhibition. The temple has a land area of 3,500 square meters. On 8 September 1981, the government of Anhui claimed Huacheng Temple as a key conserved location of historical relics. In 1983, the state council honored Huacheng Temple as national key Buddhist temple in Han area.

== Art ==
Mount Jiuhua has always attracted creative minds; poets and artists have visited here. As a result, there has been a rich legacy of art in the Huacheng Temple. Great artists, poets, and playwrights such as Li Bai, Liu Yuxi, Du Mu, Mei Yaochen, Wang Anshi, Wen Tianxiang, Tang Xianzu and Zhang Daqian have come to the mountain. Their calligraphic works and paintings survive to this day and are now housed in the Jiuhua Museum of Buddhist Relics.

== Architecture ==
Huacheng Temple located at the foot of Mount Furong. It is the main and first temple of Jiuhua Mountains as well as bodhimanda of Kṣitigarbha. Now the existing halls and rooms were built in the Qing dynasty (1644–1911), the main buildings include Lingguan Hall, Four Heavenly Kings Hall, Mahavira Hall and Buddhist Texts Library.

=== Mahavira Hall ===
The 20.5-metre (67 ft) deep Mahavira Hall enshrining the statue of Kṣitigarbha. He stands on the base platform made of white marble. He drops his hands naturally with palms outward, meaning to realize wishes of all living creatures.

Right above of hall, there are three big and small caissons (藻井) which were made in 1889 during the reign of Guangxu Emperor (1875–1908) in the Qing dynasty (1644–1911). The eight corners of the big caisson are carved with eight Chinese dragons, which plus another Chinese dragon on the top of the caisson and the flame pearl from the pattern of "Nine Dragons Playing with a Ball" (九龙戏珠). The small caissons are on both sides of the big caisson.

=== Buddhist Texts Library ===
The Buddhist Texts Library is 20-metre (66 ft) high and 14-metre (46 ft) deep. The hall stores the well-preserved Nirvana Sutra (涅槃经) and Avatamsaka Sutra (华严经) written by monk Wuxia (无瑕) with his own blood in the Ming dynasty (1368–1644).

== National Treasure ==
A 1,000-kilogram (2,200 lb) weight and 2-metre (6 ft 7 in) high bell is housed in the temple. It was cast between 1875 and 1908 during the Guangxu period (1875–1908) of the Qing dynasty (1644–1911). At the beginning of the Chinese New Year, the bell is rung 108 times to represent 12 months, 24 solar terms and 72 hou (候, Hou is an ancient Chinese seasonal divider, every 3 hou comes a Chinese seasonal divider), which signifies peace, good fortune and prevention of evils and bad luck for the year.
