= Qingyang =

Qingyang may refer to:

- Qingyang, Chengdu (成都市青羊区), a central urban district of Chengdu, Sichuan, China
- Qingyang, Anhui (安徽省青阳县), a county in Anhui, China
- Qingyang, Gansu (甘肃省庆阳市), a city in Gansu, China
  - Qingyang event, a meteor shower
- Qingyang, Jiangyin (江阴市青阳镇), a town in Jiangyin, Wuxi, Jiangsu, China
