= Ganlu Temple (Mount Jiuhua) =

Buddhist temple in Anhui, China

- 甘露寺

Religion
- Affiliation: Buddhism
- Sect: Chan Buddhism

Location
- Location: Mount Jiuhua, Qingyang County, Anhui
- Country: China
- Interactive map of Ganlu Temple
- Coordinates: 30°30′02″N 117°48′31″E

Architecture
- Style: Chinese architecture
- Founder: Dong'an (洞安)
- Established: 1667

Ganlu Temple (Chinese: 甘露寺; pinyin: Gānlù Sì) is a Buddhist temple located on Mount Jiuhua, in Qingyang County, Anhui, China.

== Name ==
The name of "Ganlu" derives from Lotus Sutra.

== History ==
The temple was originally built by an exceptional Chan master Dong'an (洞安) in 1667, after Kangxi Emperor (1662–1722) ascended the throne during the Qing dynasty (1644–1911). The temple had reached unprecedented heyday in the reign of Qianlong Emperor (1736–1795) while abbot Youtan (优昙) preached Buddhism here.

Ganlu Temple has been inscribed as a National Key Buddhist Temple in Han Chinese Area by the State Council of China in 1983.

== Architecture ==
The temple covers a building area of 3,500 square metres (38,000 sq ft). Now the existing main buildings include Mahavira Hall, Bell tower, Drum tower, and ring-rooms.
