= Wusha, Anhui =

Wusha 乌沙镇
- Town
- Location in China
- Coordinates: 30°38′51″N 117°18′2″E
- Country: People's Republic of China
- Province: Anhui
- Prefecture-level city: Chizhou
- District: Guichi District
- Time zone: UTC+8 (China Standard)

Wusha (simplified Chinese: 乌沙; traditional Chinese: 烏沙; pinyin: Wūshā) is a town of Guichi District, Chizhou, Anhui, China. As of 2020, it administers Wusha Residential Community, Yantang (晏塘) Residential Community, and the following twelve villages:

- Xinzhuang Village (新庄村)
- Lianzhuang Village (联庄村)
- Fengzhuang Village (丰庄村)
- Hengtang Village (横塘村)
- Xinyi Village (新义村)
- Liyang Village (李阳村)
- Longgan Village (龙干村)
- Dengta Village (灯塔村)
- Liancun Village (联村村)
- Hongzhuang Village (红庄村)
- Lianhua Village (莲花村)
- Shuangtang Village (双塘村)

== See also ==
- List of township-level divisions of Anhui
