= Guichi, Chizhou =

Guichi 贵池区 Kweichih
- District
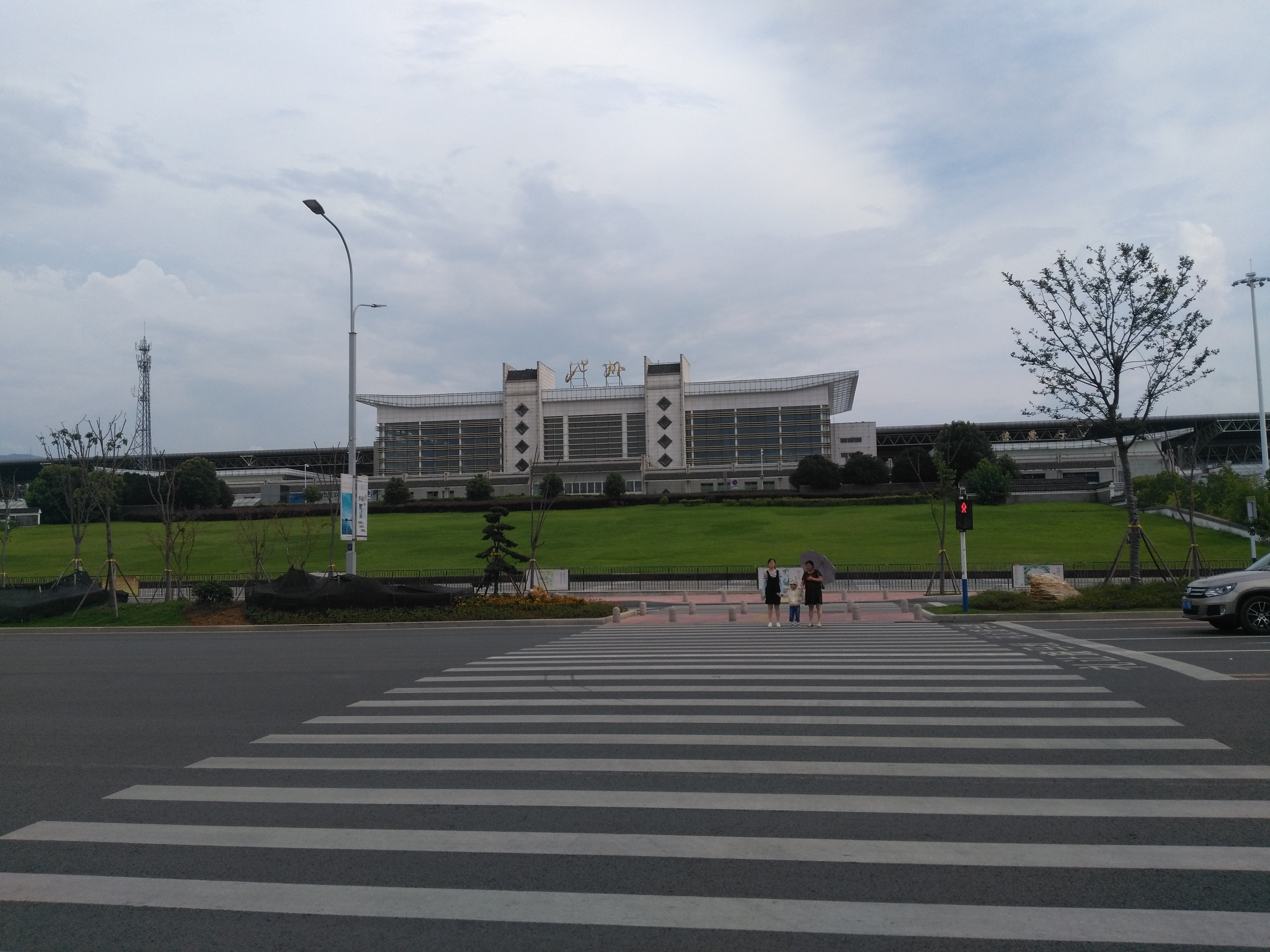
- Interactive map of Guichi
- Coordinates (Chizhou government): 30°39′54″N 117°29′29″E
- Country: People's Republic of China
- Province: Anhui
- Prefecture-level city: Chizhou

Area
  - Total: 2,516 km^{2} (971 sq mi)

Population (2019)
  - Total: 636,000
  - Density: 253/km^{2} (655/sq mi)
- Time zone: UTC+8 (China Standard)
- Postal code: 247100

Guichi District (simplified Chinese: 贵池区; traditional Chinese: 貴池區; pinyin: Guìchí Qū) is a district of the city of Chizhou, Anhui province, People's Republic of China and the seat of the city government. The district has a population of 636,000 and an area of 2,516 km^{2} (971 sq mi). It was called Guichi City before 2000.

== Administration ==
As of 2011, Guichi District has jurisdiction over 11 subdistricts and 9 towns.

=== Subdistricts ===
- Chiyang Subdistrict (池阳街道)
- Qiupu Subdistrict (秋浦街道)
- Lishan Subdistrict (里山街道)
- Jiangkou Subdistrict (江口街道)
- Maya Subdistrict (马衙街道)
- Dunshang Subdistrict (墩上街道)
- Meilong Subdistrict (梅龙街道)
- Qiujiang Subdistrict (秋江街道)
- Xinghuacun Subdistrict (杏花村街道)
- Qingfeng Subdistrict (清风街道)
- Qingxi Subdistrict (清溪街道)

=== Towns ===
- Yinhui (殷汇镇)
- Niutoushan (牛头山镇)
- Wusha (乌沙镇)
- Meijie (梅街镇)
- Meicun (梅村镇)
- Tangtian (唐田镇)
- Pailou (牌楼镇)
- Tangxi (棠溪镇)
- Juanqiao (涓桥镇)

== Transport ==
- China National Highway 318
