= Chizhou =

Chizhou 池州市 Chihchow
- Prefecture-level city
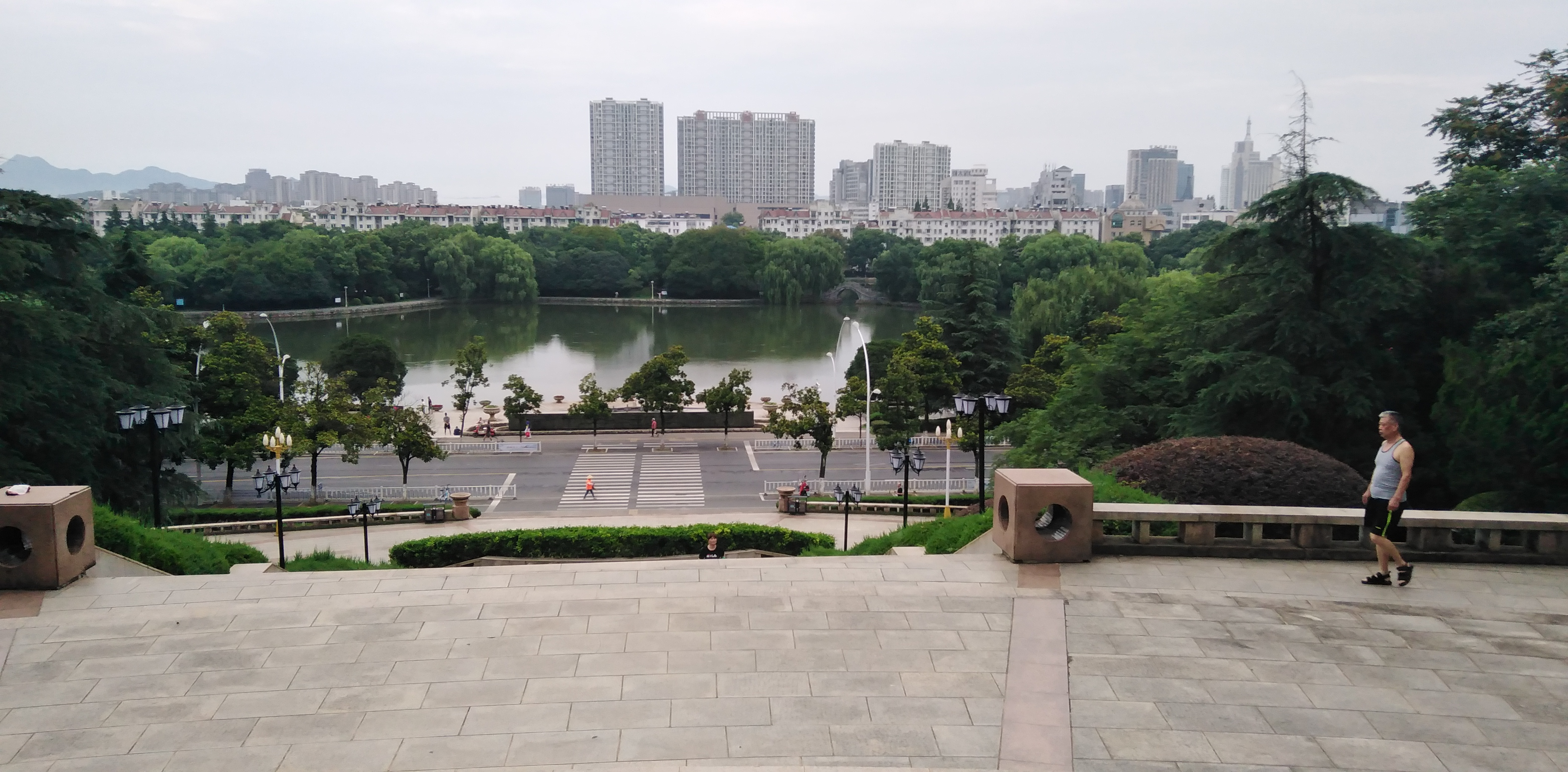
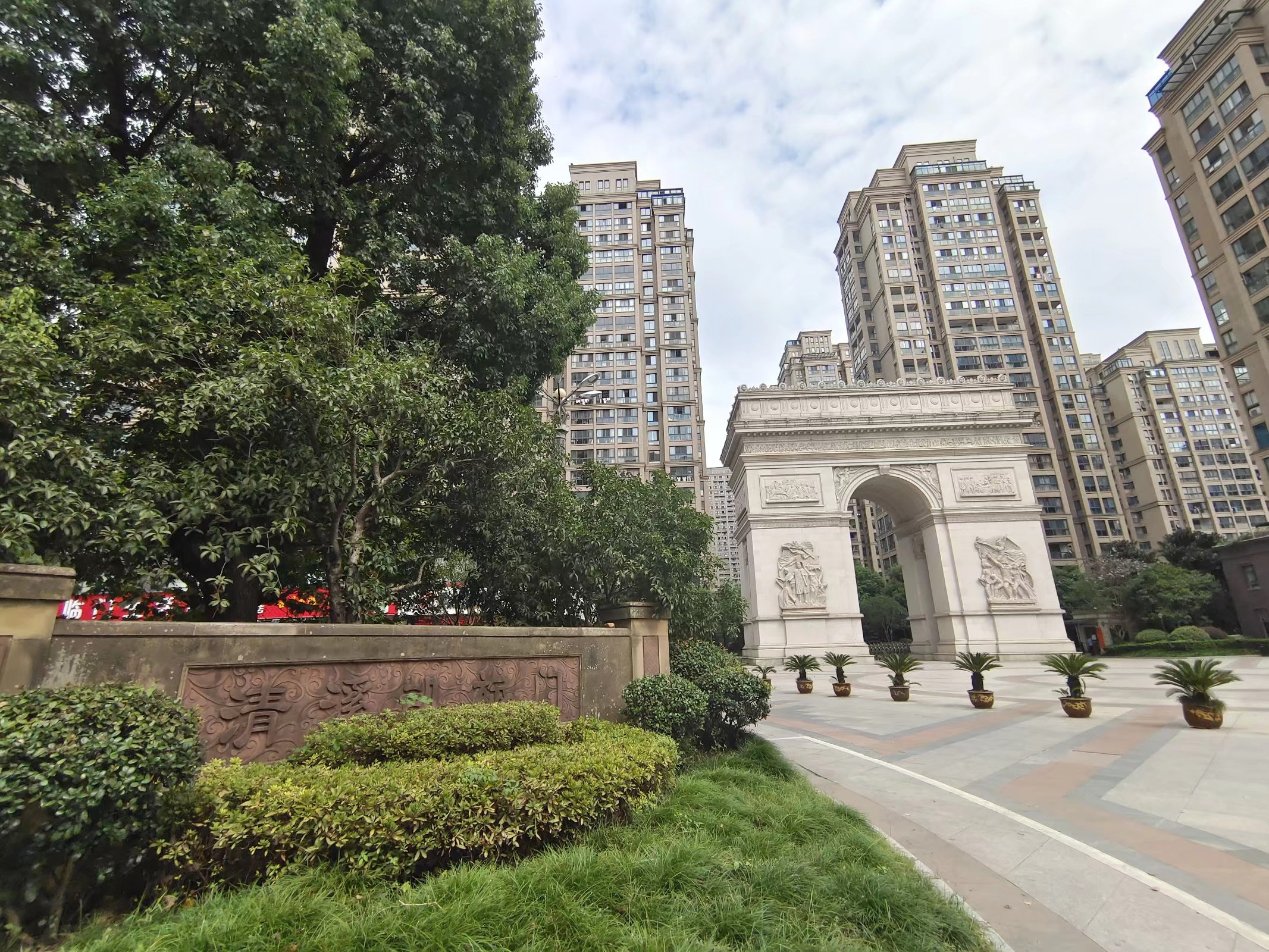
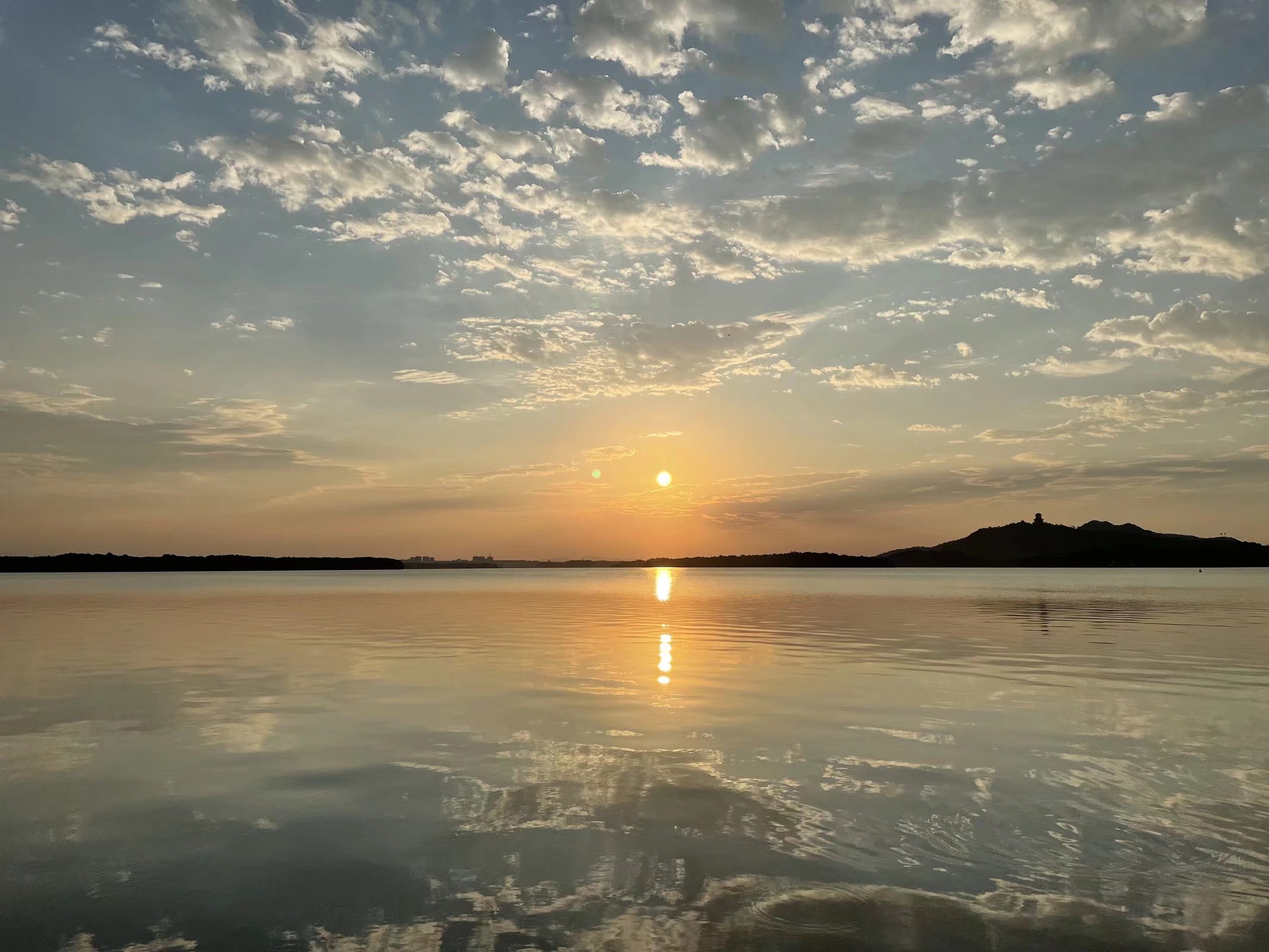
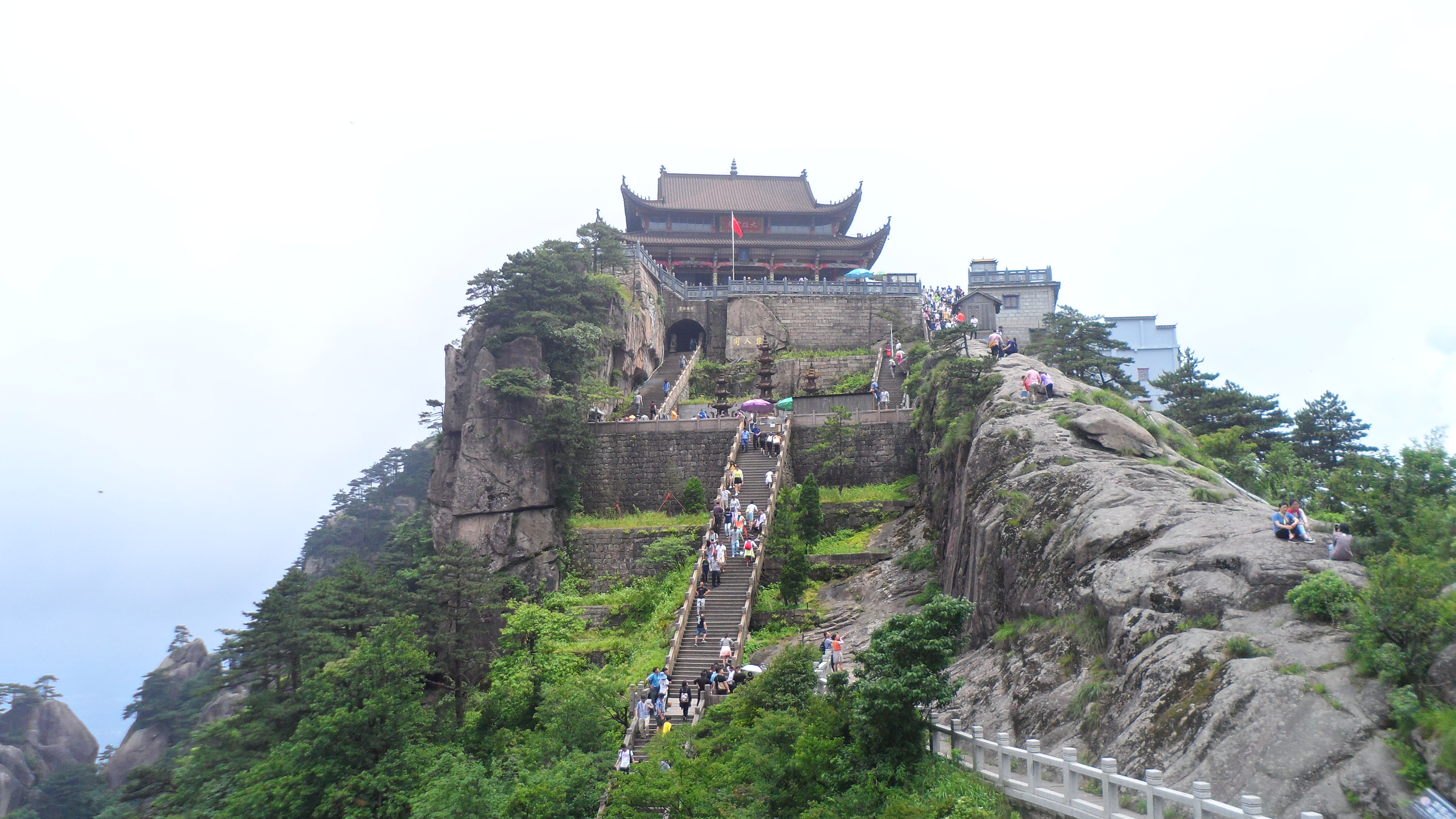
- Clockwise from top: view from Baihe Park, sunset over Pingtian Lake, Tiantai Temple atop Mount Jiuhua, and a neighborhood in the Guichi District.

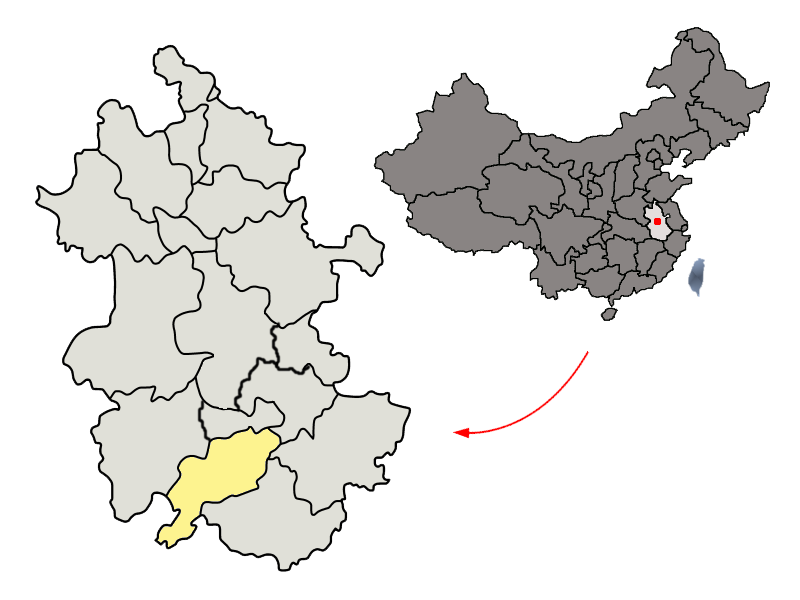
- Coordinates (Chizhou municipal government): 30°39′55″N 117°29′30″E
- Country: People's Republic of China
- Province: Anhui
- County-level divisions: 4
- Municipal seat: Guichi District

Government
  - CPC Secretary: Wang Hong (王宏)
  - Mayor: Yong Chenghan (雍成瀚)

Area
  - Prefecture-level city: 8,399 km^{2} (3,243 sq mi)
  - Urban: 2,514 km^{2} (971 sq mi)
  - Metro: 2,514 km^{2} (971 sq mi)

Population (2020 census)
  - Prefecture-level city: 1,342,764
  - Density: 159.9/km^{2} (414.1/sq mi)
  - Urban: 615,274
  - Urban density: 244.7/km^{2} (633.9/sq mi)
  - Metro: 615,274
  - Metro density: 244.7/km^{2} (633.9/sq mi)

GDP
  - Prefecture-level city: CN¥ 100.4 billion US$ 12.4 billion
  - Per capita: CN¥ 75,446; US$ 11,695
- Time zone: UTC+8 (CST)
- Postal code: 247100
- Area code: 0566
- ISO 3166 code: CN-AH-17
- License Plate Prefix: 皖R
- City tree: Camphor tree
- City flower: Armenian plum
- Website: www.chizhou.gov.cn

Chizhou (Chinese: 池州; pinyin: Chízhōu) is a prefecture-level city in the south of Anhui province, China. It borders Anqing to the northwest, Tongling and Wuhu to the northeast, Xuancheng to the east, Huangshan to the southeast, and the province of Jiangxi to the southwest, respectively. The geographical coordinates of Chizhou City are Latitude: 30.664800 Longitude: 117.491568. Its population was 1,342,764 as of the 2020 census, of whom 615,274 lived in the built-up (or metro) area made of Guichi District. Mount Jiuhua (Jǐuhuáshān), located in Qingyang county, is one of the four sacred mountains of Chinese Buddhism. Historical celebrities from Chizhou include Du Xunhe, Hua Yue, Wu Mingdao, Liu Fang, Lu Zhongyuan, Zhang Yunxian, Luo Shangzhong, Chen Yifu, etc.

In May 1949, the Chizhou Special Administrative Region was established under the jurisdiction of the people's Administrative Office of Southern Anhui and the Chizhou Special Administrative Office in Guichi county.

From February 1952 to May 1965, Chizhou Special Area was abolished, and the counties under its jurisdiction were divided into Anqing Special Area, Huizhou Special Area, and Wuhu Special Area, respectively.

From May 1965 to January 1980, the Chizhou special zone was set up, directly under jurisdiction of Anhui province.

From January 1980 to August 1988, Chizhou Special Area was abolished and the counties under its jurisdiction were incorporated into Anqing Special Area, Xuancheng Special Area, and Huizhou Special Area.

In August 1988, the Chizhou area was relocated to Anhui province.

On 26 June 2000, Guichi District, Dongzhi County, Qingyang County, Shitai County, Jiuhua Mountain Scenic Area, and Chizhou Economic and Technological Development Zone were withdrawn and built.

== Administration ==
The prefecture-level city of Chizhou administers four county-level divisions, including one district and three counties.

- Guichi District (贵池区)
- Dongzhi County (东至县)
- Shitai County (石台县)
- Qingyang County (青阳县)

Map
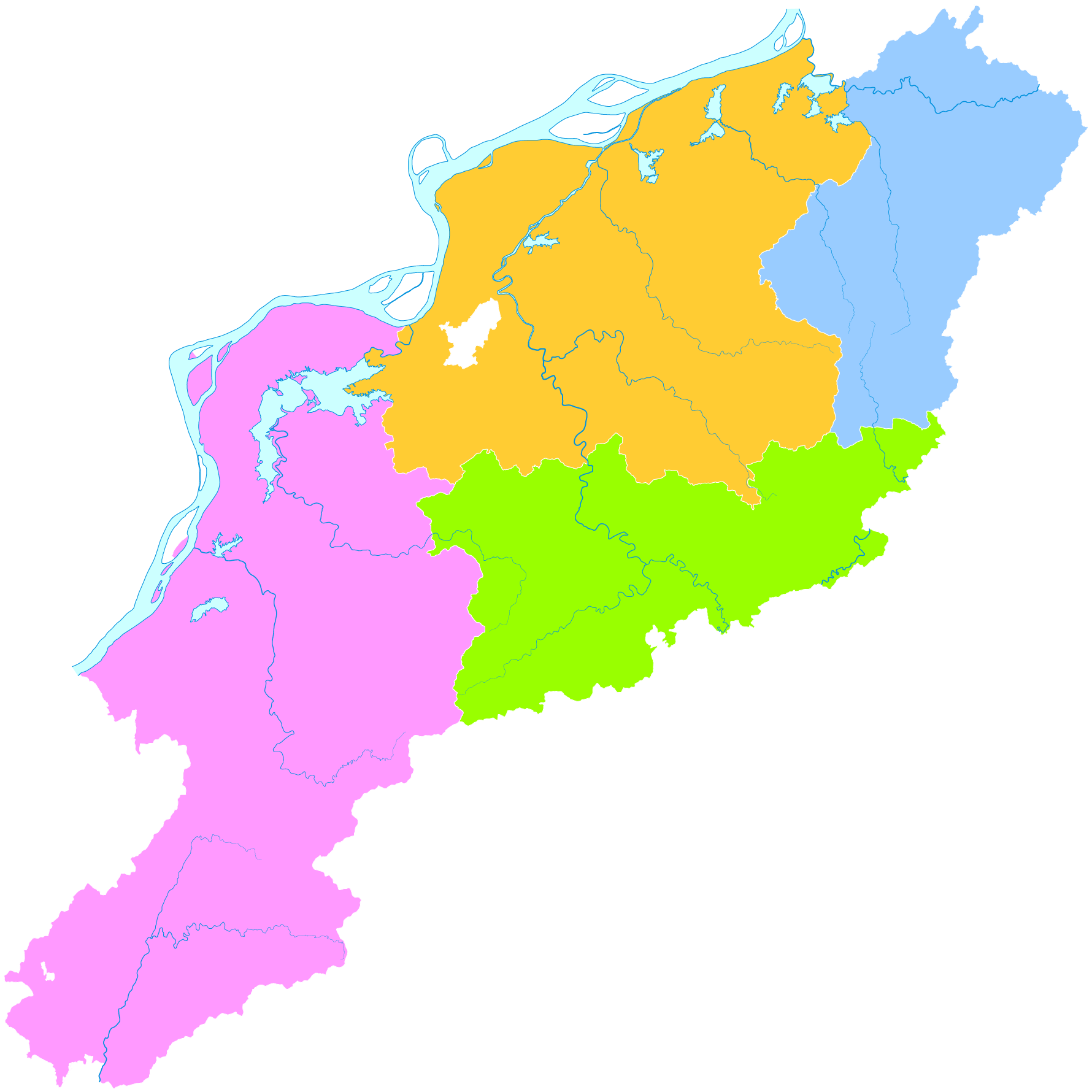

== Climate ==
Chizhou is located in the southwest of Anhui Province, bordering the mighty Yangtze River to the north and the majestic Huangshan Mountain to the south. The terrain is high in the southeast and low in the northwest, and is distributed in steps from south to north. It is located in the transition zone between the warm temperate zone and the subtropical zone, and has a subtropical humid monsoon climate. The city's average annual rainfall is 1500-1700 mm, with rainfall concentrated in the flood season from May to September. It is prone to flooding in spring and summer and drought in autumn, and there are not many years with good weather and good harvests.

Climate data for Chizhou, elevation 15 m (49 ft), (1991–2020 normals, extremes 1991–present)
Month	Jan	Feb	Mar	Apr	May	Jun	Jul	Aug	Sep	Oct	Nov	Dec	Year
Record high °C (°F)	21.8 (71.2)	29.1 (84.4)	32.7 (90.9)	34.2 (93.6)	36.1 (97.0)	37.0 (98.6)	40.0 (104.0)	40.7 (105.3)	37.5 (99.5)	34.4 (93.9)	30.1 (86.2)	22.5 (72.5)	40.7 (105.3)
Mean daily maximum °C (°F)	7.7 (45.9)	10.7 (51.3)	15.6 (60.1)	22.1 (71.8)	27.0 (80.6)	29.6 (85.3)	33.0 (91.4)	32.4 (90.3)	28.2 (82.8)	23.0 (73.4)	16.8 (62.2)	10.3 (50.5)	21.4 (70.5)
Daily mean °C (°F)	4.0 (39.2)	6.5 (43.7)	11.0 (51.8)	17.0 (62.6)	22.2 (72.0)	25.4 (77.7)	28.8 (83.8)	28.1 (82.6)	23.9 (75.0)	18.3 (64.9)	12.1 (53.8)	6.1 (43.0)	17.0 (62.5)
Mean daily minimum °C (°F)	1.2 (34.2)	3.3 (37.9)	7.4 (45.3)	13.0 (55.4)	18.2 (64.8)	22.1 (71.8)	25.5 (77.9)	25.0 (77.0)	20.7 (69.3)	14.7 (58.5)	8.6 (47.5)	2.9 (37.2)	13.5 (56.4)
Record low °C (°F)	−9.1 (15.6)	−7.3 (18.9)	−3.6 (25.5)	2.9 (37.2)	9.4 (48.9)	15.5 (59.9)	17.8 (64.0)	17.5 (63.5)	11.8 (53.2)	4.7 (40.5)	−3.2 (26.2)	−11.1 (12.0)	−11.1 (12.0)
Average precipitation mm (inches)	76.8 (3.02)	87.2 (3.43)	128.7 (5.07)	150.9 (5.94)	169.0 (6.65)	282.6 (11.13)	224.9 (8.85)	136.4 (5.37)	77.1 (3.04)	64.6 (2.54)	73.7 (2.90)	47.7 (1.88)	1,519.6 (59.82)
Average precipitation days (≥ 0.1 mm)	12.2	12.1	14.7	13.2	13.0	14.2	12.4	12.5	9.1	9.3	9.9	9.1	141.7
Average snowy days	4.5	2.4	1.0	0.1	0	0	0	0	0	0	0.3	1.6	9.9
Average relative humidity (%)	78	77	76	75	75	80	78	79	79	77	78	76	77
Mean monthly sunshine hours	95.9	99.6	121.1	147.4	163.1	135.2	194.2	181.6	145.3	146.8	127.5	117.7	1,675.4
Percentage possible sunshine	30	32	32	38	38	32	45	45	40	42	40	37	38
Source: China Meteorological Administration all-time January high

== Transport ==
Chizhou is served by Chizhou railway station on the Nanjing–Anqing intercity railway and the Tongling–Jiujiang railway.

Chizhou Jiuhuashan Airport was opened in August 2013, serving Tongling and Mount Jiuhua. It is about 20 kilometers away from Chizhou City, Tongling City and the Kecun Base of Jiuhua Mountain Scenic Area, about 3 kilometers away from the Yangtze River, and is located in the core area of the Jiangnan Industrial Concentration Zone in Anhui Province.
