= Qingyang, Anhui =

Qingyang 青阳县 Tsingyang
- County
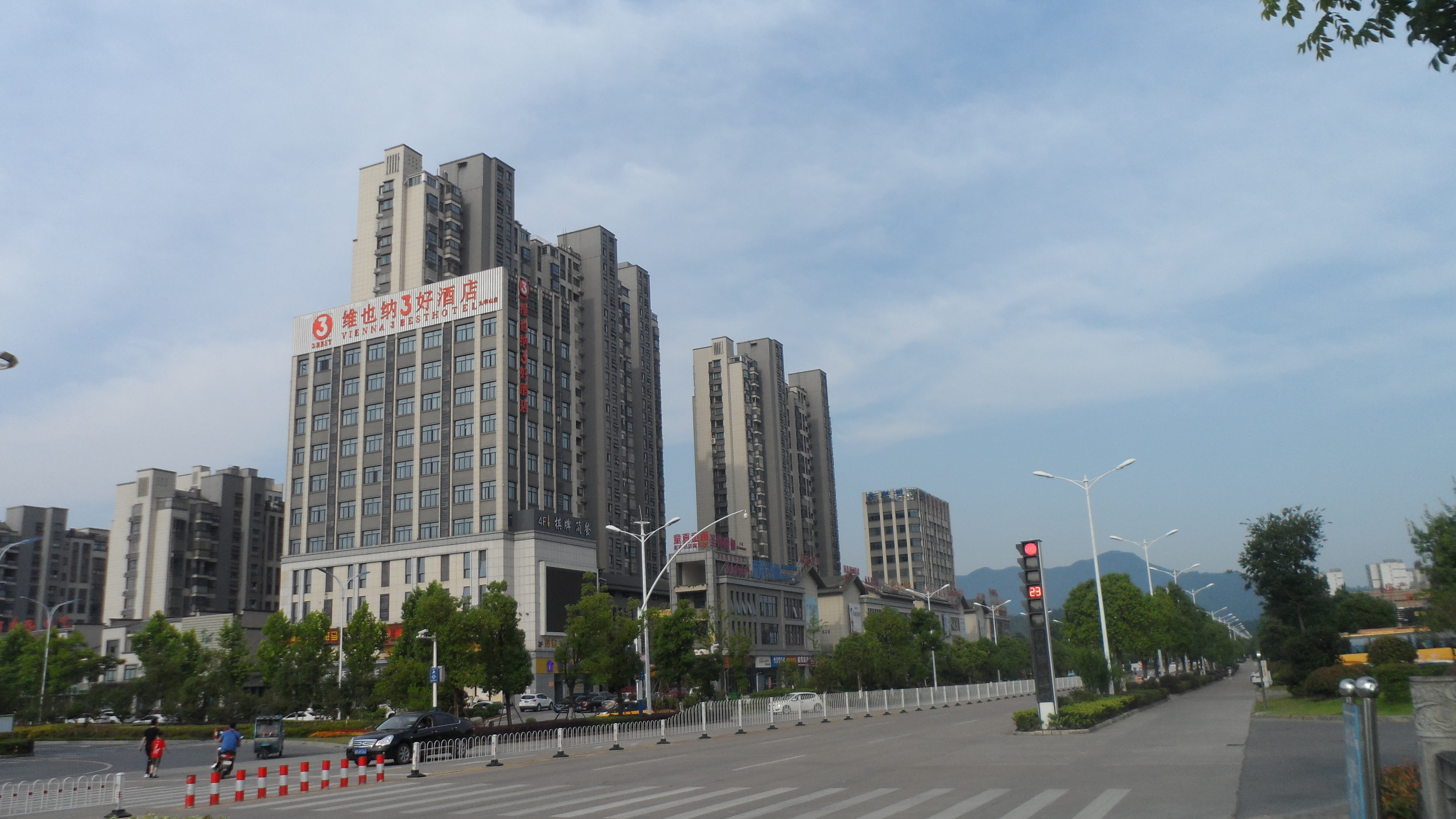

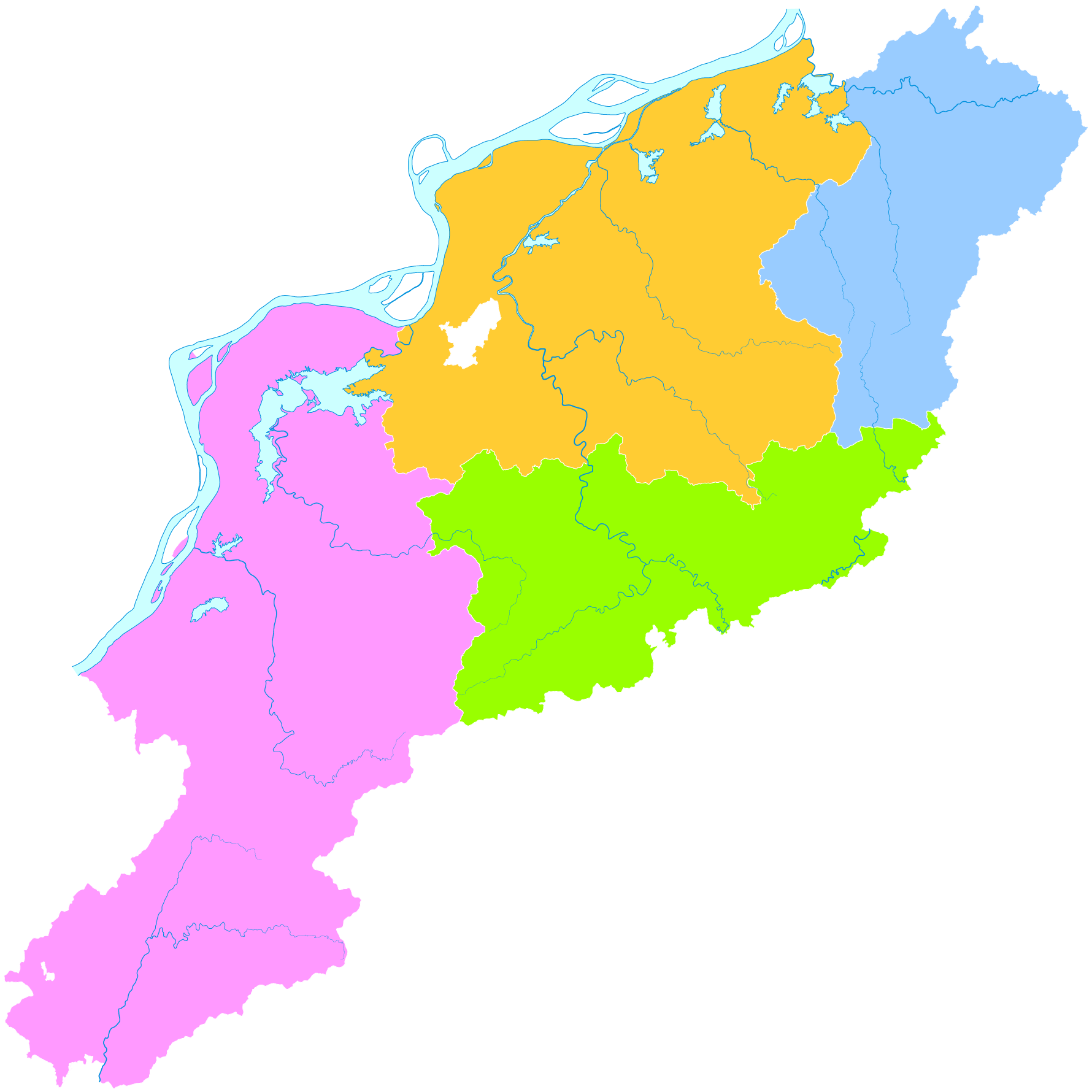
- Qingyang is the northeasternmost division in this map of Chizhou

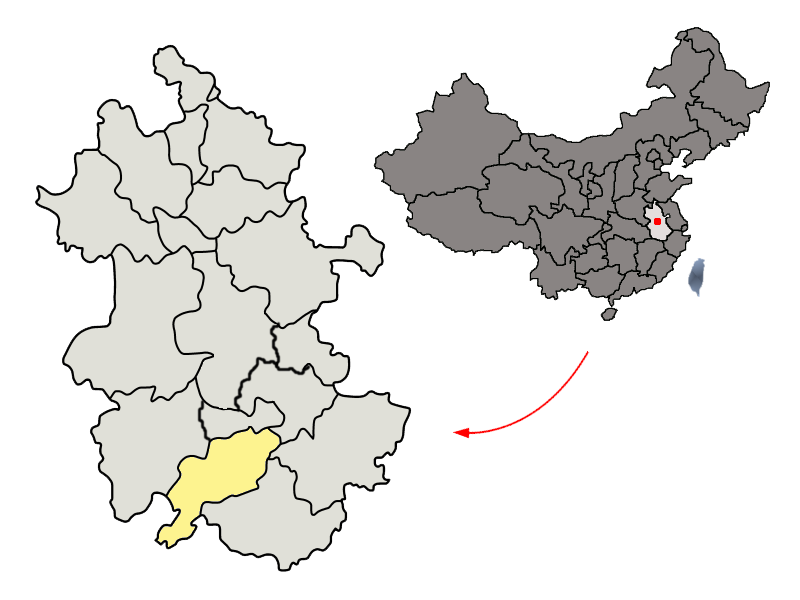
- Chizhou in Anhui
- Coordinates: 30°38′20″N 117°50′49″E
- Country: People's Republic of China
- Province: Anhui
- Prefecture-level city: Chizhou

Area
  - Total: 1,181 km^{2} (456 sq mi)

Population (2019)
  - Total: 257,000
  - Density: 218/km^{2} (564/sq mi)
- Time zone: UTC+8 (China Standard)
- Postal code: 242800

Qingyang County (simplified Chinese: 青阳县; traditional Chinese: 青陽縣; pinyin: Qīngyáng Xiàn) is a county in the south of Anhui Province, People's Republic of China. It is the northeasternmost county-level division of the prefecture-level city of Chizhou. It has a population of 280,000 and an area of 1,181 square kilometres (456 sq mi). The government of Qingyang County is located in Rongcheng Town. Qingyang county benefited in 1540 from Ming literate Mao Kun (Chinese: 茅坤) (1512–1601)'s brief (2-month) tenure as magistrate. He helped the coppersmiths of the area by shutting down illegal shops that were being run by people from outside the county, and mitigated the abuses of local bullies. The county honored him with a shrine when he had to return home to mourn his father's death according to traditional rite.

== Administrative divisions ==
Qingyang County has jurisdiction over 8 towns and 3 townships.

=== Towns ===
- Rongcheng (蓉城镇)
- Muzhen (木镇镇)
- Dingqiao (丁桥镇)
- Xinhe (新河镇)
- Zhubei (朱备镇)
- Lingyang (陵阳镇)
- Yangtian (杨田镇)
- Miaoqian (庙前镇)

==== Former Towns ====
- Tongbu (童埠镇), Jiuhua (九华镇), Wuqi (五溪镇), Shaji (沙济镇)

=== Townships ===
- Qiaomu Township (乔木乡)
- Youhua Township (酉华乡)
- Ducun Township (杜村乡)

==== Former Townships ====
- Chengdong Township (城东乡), Yangtian Township (杨田乡), Dongbao Township (东堡乡), Nanyang Township (南阳乡), Zhuyang Township (竹阳乡), Jiuhua Township (九华乡)

== Climate ==
Climate data for Qingyang, elevation 77 m (253 ft), (1991–2020 normals, extremes 1991–present)
Month	Jan	Feb	Mar	Apr	May	Jun	Jul	Aug	Sep	Oct	Nov	Dec	Year
Record high °C (°F)	24.5 (76.1)	29.4 (84.9)	36.2 (97.2)	35.2 (95.4)	37.1 (98.8)	38.5 (101.3)	40.9 (105.6)	41.0 (105.8)	38.7 (101.7)	40.9 (105.6)	31.0 (87.8)	24.0 (75.2)	41.0 (105.8)
Mean daily maximum °C (°F)	8.3 (46.9)	11.4 (52.5)	16.4 (61.5)	22.9 (73.2)	27.6 (81.7)	30.0 (86.0)	33.7 (92.7)	32.9 (91.2)	28.6 (83.5)	23.5 (74.3)	17.4 (63.3)	11.0 (51.8)	22.0 (71.6)
Daily mean °C (°F)	3.7 (38.7)	6.3 (43.3)	10.8 (51.4)	17.1 (62.8)	22.0 (71.6)	25.2 (77.4)	28.7 (83.7)	27.8 (82.0)	23.4 (74.1)	17.7 (63.9)	11.5 (52.7)	5.6 (42.1)	16.7 (62.0)
Mean daily minimum °C (°F)	0.4 (32.7)	2.6 (36.7)	6.7 (44.1)	12.4 (54.3)	17.6 (63.7)	21.5 (70.7)	24.9 (76.8)	24.3 (75.7)	19.7 (67.5)	13.5 (56.3)	7.3 (45.1)	1.8 (35.2)	12.7 (54.9)
Record low °C (°F)	−10.0 (14.0)	−8.3 (17.1)	−5.0 (23.0)	1.5 (34.7)	8.5 (47.3)	14.6 (58.3)	18.0 (64.4)	17.1 (62.8)	11.2 (52.2)	2.9 (37.2)	−5.0 (23.0)	−14.3 (6.3)	−14.3 (6.3)
Average precipitation mm (inches)	81.8 (3.22)	87.1 (3.43)	135.5 (5.33)	146.2 (5.76)	168.1 (6.62)	278.7 (10.97)	241.7 (9.52)	183.1 (7.21)	104.3 (4.11)	66.9 (2.63)	74.6 (2.94)	52.4 (2.06)	1,620.4 (63.8)
Average precipitation days (≥ 0.1 mm)	12.5	12.9	15.2	13.9	14.0	15.1	14.5	15.3	10.6	9.4	10.5	9.9	153.8
Average snowy days	4.8	2.5	0.9	0	0	0	0	0	0	0	0.3	1.9	10.4
Average relative humidity (%)	80	79	77	75	76	81	79	82	82	80	81	79	79
Mean monthly sunshine hours	110.8	113.9	135.0	161.1	178.8	154.9	213.0	195.1	160.8	165.1	142.3	133.0	1,863.8
Percentage possible sunshine	34	36	36	42	42	37	50	48	44	47	45	42	42
Source: China Meteorological Administration all-time October record

Climate data for Mount Jiuhua, elevation 647 m (2,123 ft), (1991–2020 normals)
Month	Jan	Feb	Mar	Apr	May	Jun	Jul	Aug	Sep	Oct	Nov	Dec	Year
Mean daily maximum °C (°F)	5.4 (41.7)	8.3 (46.9)	13.2 (55.8)	19.3 (66.7)	23.7 (74.7)	26.0 (78.8)	29.3 (84.7)	28.4 (83.1)	24.3 (75.7)	19.7 (67.5)	14.3 (57.7)	8.3 (46.9)	18.4 (65.0)
Daily mean °C (°F)	1.6 (34.9)	4.2 (39.6)	8.7 (47.7)	14.8 (58.6)	19.4 (66.9)	22.5 (72.5)	25.8 (78.4)	24.8 (76.6)	20.7 (69.3)	15.7 (60.3)	10.0 (50.0)	4.0 (39.2)	14.4 (57.8)
Mean daily minimum °C (°F)	−1.0 (30.2)	1.4 (34.5)	5.3 (41.5)	11.1 (52.0)	16.0 (60.8)	19.6 (67.3)	23.1 (73.6)	22.0 (71.6)	17.9 (64.2)	12.7 (54.9)	7.1 (44.8)	1.3 (34.3)	11.4 (52.5)
Average precipitation mm (inches)	102.6 (4.04)	106.6 (4.20)	173.0 (6.81)	194.5 (7.66)	219.7 (8.65)	315.7 (12.43)	305.5 (12.03)	289.3 (11.39)	143.2 (5.64)	110.9 (4.37)	97.0 (3.82)	76.6 (3.02)	2,134.6 (84.06)
Average precipitation days (≥ 0.1 mm)	13.2	13.7	16.2	15.6	15.0	16.6	15.4	17.4	12.7	10.8	11.5	10.9	169
Average snowy days	7.8	4.9	2.4	0.1	0	0	0	0	0	0	0.6	3.7	19.5
Average relative humidity (%)	76	76	73	72	74	81	78	82	82	74	73	70	76
Mean monthly sunshine hours	103.1	101.7	121.1	142.9	156.4	122.2	174.8	156.2	134.2	148.4	130.6	129.6	1,621.2
Percentage possible sunshine	32	32	33	37	37	29	41	39	37	42	41	41	37
Source: China Meteorological Administration

== Transport ==
- China National Highway 318
