= Yishan Yining =

Chinese Buddhist monk who traveled to Japan

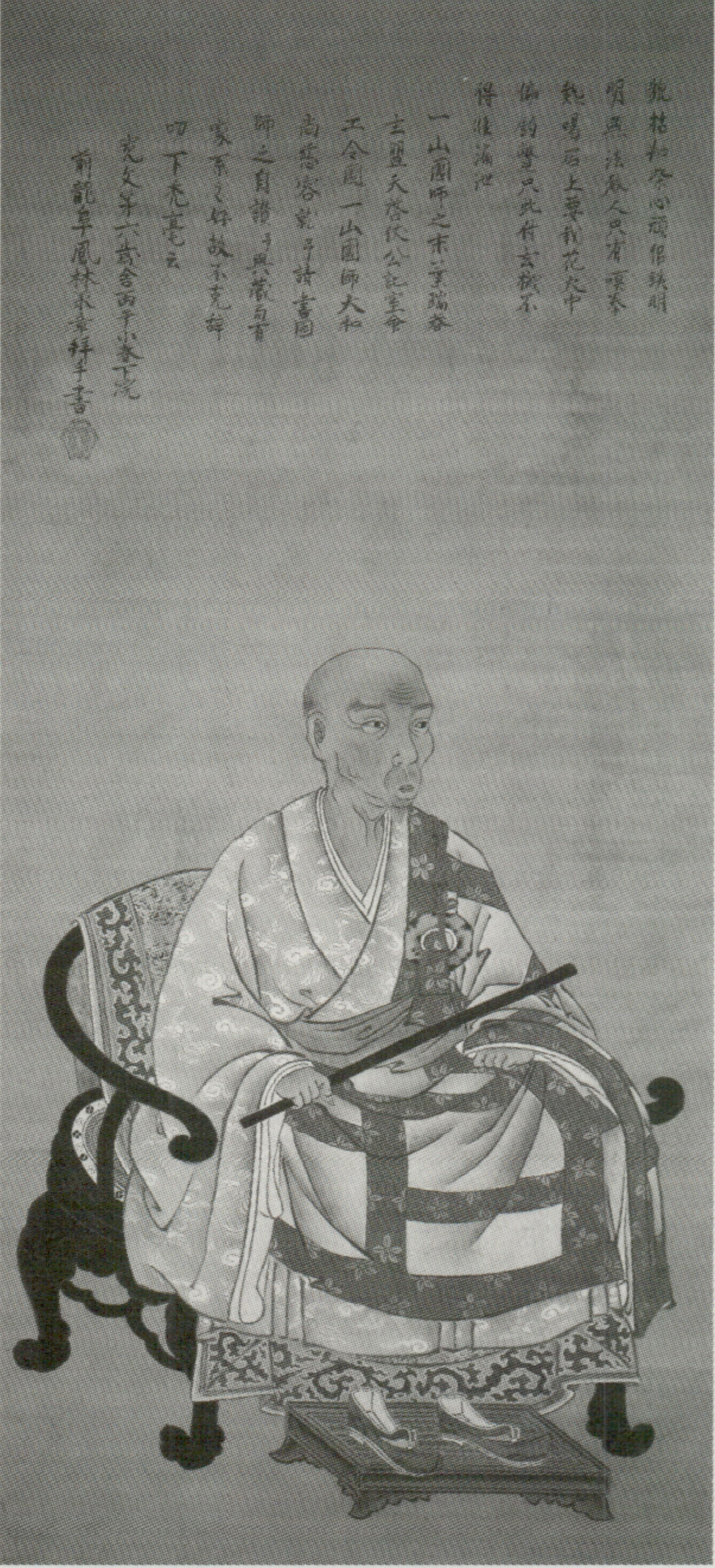

Yishan Yining (一山一寧, in Japanese: Issan Ichinei; 1247 – 28 November 1317) was a Chinese Buddhist monk who traveled to Japan. Before monkhood his family name was Hu. He was born in 1247 in Linhai, Taizhou, Zhejiang, China. He was a monk of the Linji school during the Yuan dynasty of China, and subsequently a Rinzai Zen master who rose to prominence in Kamakura Japan. He was one of the chief disseminators of Zen Buddhism among the new militarized nobility of Japan, a calligrapher and a writer. Mastering a variety of literary genres and being a prolific teacher, he is mostly remembered as the pioneer of Japanese Gozan Bungaku literature, that recreated in Japan the literary forms of Song dynasty.

== Biography ==
=== China ===
Originally from Zhejiang, Yining became a monk in childhood in Hongfusi monastery (鴻福寺) and took full ordination in Puguangsi Monastery (普光寺). He originally studied Tiantai school, then turning to Chan. After changing a number of tutors, he became the Dharma heir of Wanji Singmi (頑極行彌, Japanese Gankyoku Gyomi), the fourth lineage holder of Mi'an Xianji (1118–1186). Later he became the abbot of Puji Monastery on the Island of Putuoshan and rose to wide fame as a Buddhist master.

=== Kamakura ===
In 1299, during the reign of Temür Khan, Emperor Chengzong of Yuan, the Yuan government sent him on a diplomatic mission to Japan to restore relations with the Bakufu government, carrying the document from the Yuan emperor known as the "Letter from the Yuan dynasty to Japan" (元朝寄日本書). On arrival at Kamakura he was arrested by the regent Hojo Sadatoki on charges of spying. However, soon Sadatoki came to respect his prisoner and set him free.

Yishan Yinging stayed in Japan to become one of the major Zen teachers of the Kamakura period. In Kamakura, he served in the monasteries of Kenchō-ji, Engaku-ji and Jochi-ji (淨智寺).

=== Kyoto ===
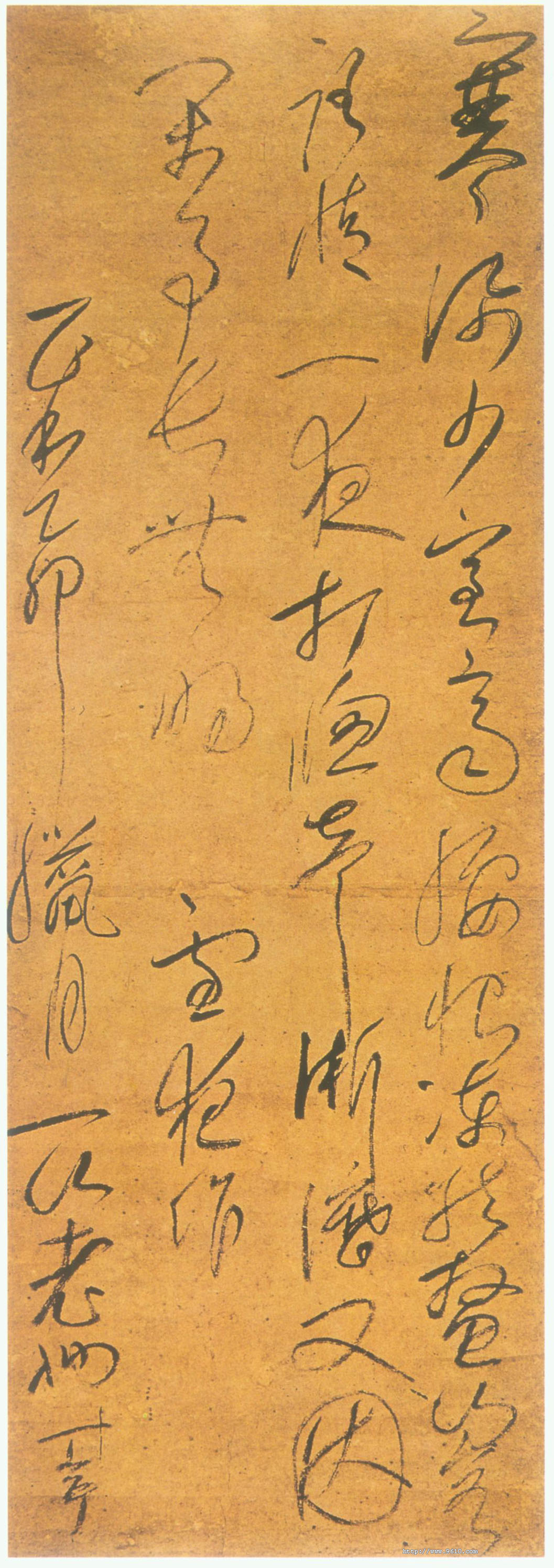
一山一宁 (A Mountain Rather), calligraphy by Yishan Yining, 1315

In 1313 the resigned emperor Go-Uda invited him to Kyoto to become the abbot of Nanzen-ji, the most influential Zen center of the time. He is still remembered in this monastery today.

=== Influence ===
He popularized Zen in the circles of new military aristocracy and, mastering variety of literary genres ranging from historiography to poetry, he started the literary orientation of Japanese monkhood to the standards of Song literature of China. This added to the standard zazen practice of Zen monasteries such ordeals as studies in Confucian canon and writings of the Song Confucian scholars.

Among his students there werу such key figures of the subsequent development of Zen as Muso Soseki, Sesson Yubai and Kokan Shiren.

=== Death ===
Yishan Yining committed suicide in 1317 after several attempts to resign from the duties of abbot on grounds of severe illness.

The Japanese Imperial Court granted him the posthumous title of the Teacher of State (国師 Kokushi).

== Bibliography ==
- 『一山国師語録』 (Recorded Sayings of National Instructor Issаn)
