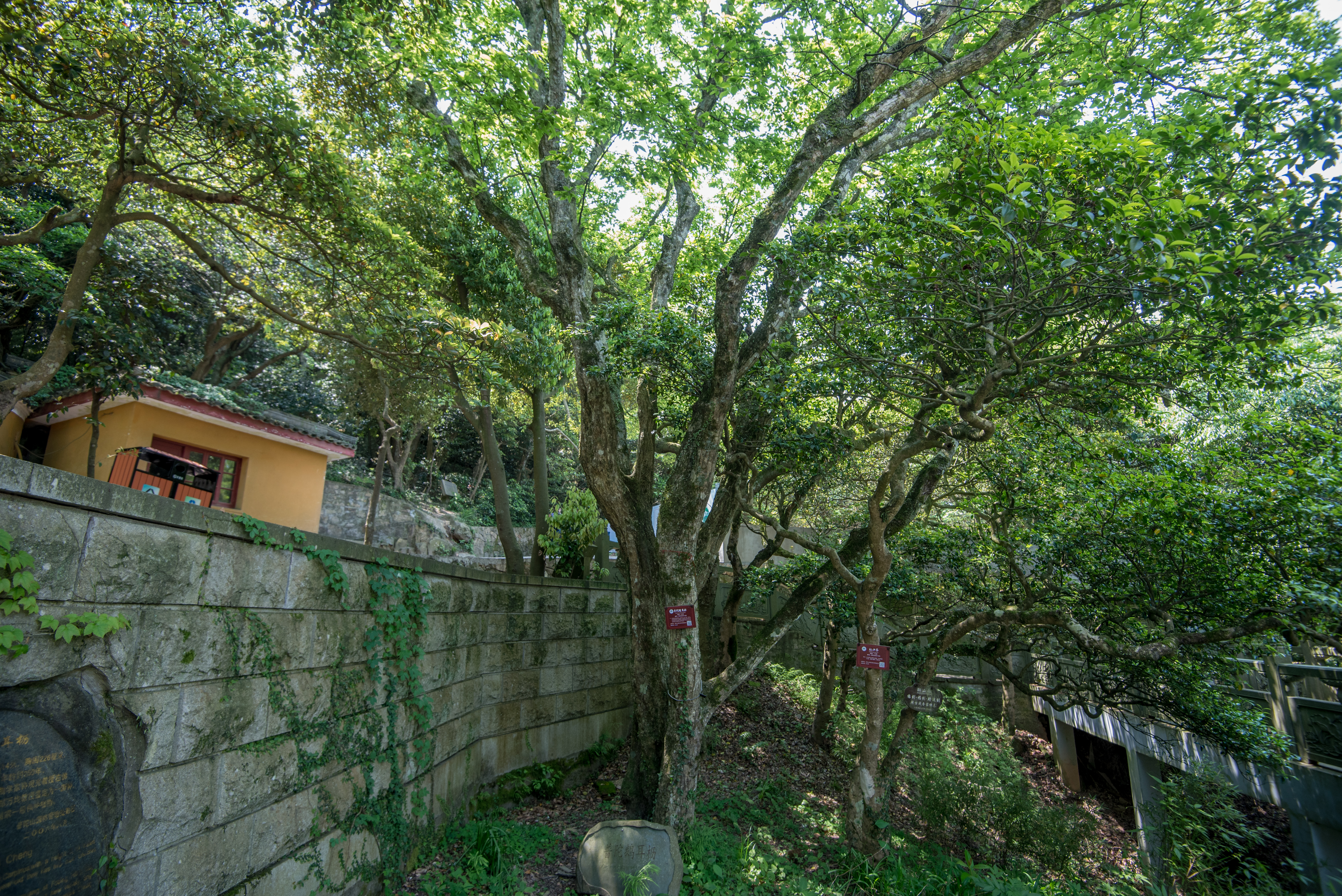
- Carpinus putoensis near Huiji Temple, Putuo Island

Conservation status
- Critically Endangered (IUCN 3.1)

Scientific classification
- Kingdom: Plantae
- Clade: Tracheophytes
- Clade: Angiosperms
- Clade: Eudicots
- Clade: Rosids
- Order: Fagales
- Family: Betulaceae
- Genus: Carpinus
- Species: C. putoensis

Binomial name
- Carpinus putoensis Cheng

= Carpinus putoensis =

Species of tree

Carpinus putoensis (Putuo hornbeam, Chinese: 普陀鹅耳枥) is a species of plant in the family Betulaceae. It is a small tree, up to 15 metres (49 ft) tall.

It is endemic to Zhoushan archipelago in China where it survives as a single tree on Putuo Island. It is monoecious, thereby in principle still able to reproduce sexually in the wild. According to Edward O. Wilson, this is an example of what conservation biologists call "living dead" species.
