= Huiji Temple (Mount Putuo) =

Buddhist temple in Zhejiang, China

- 慧济寺
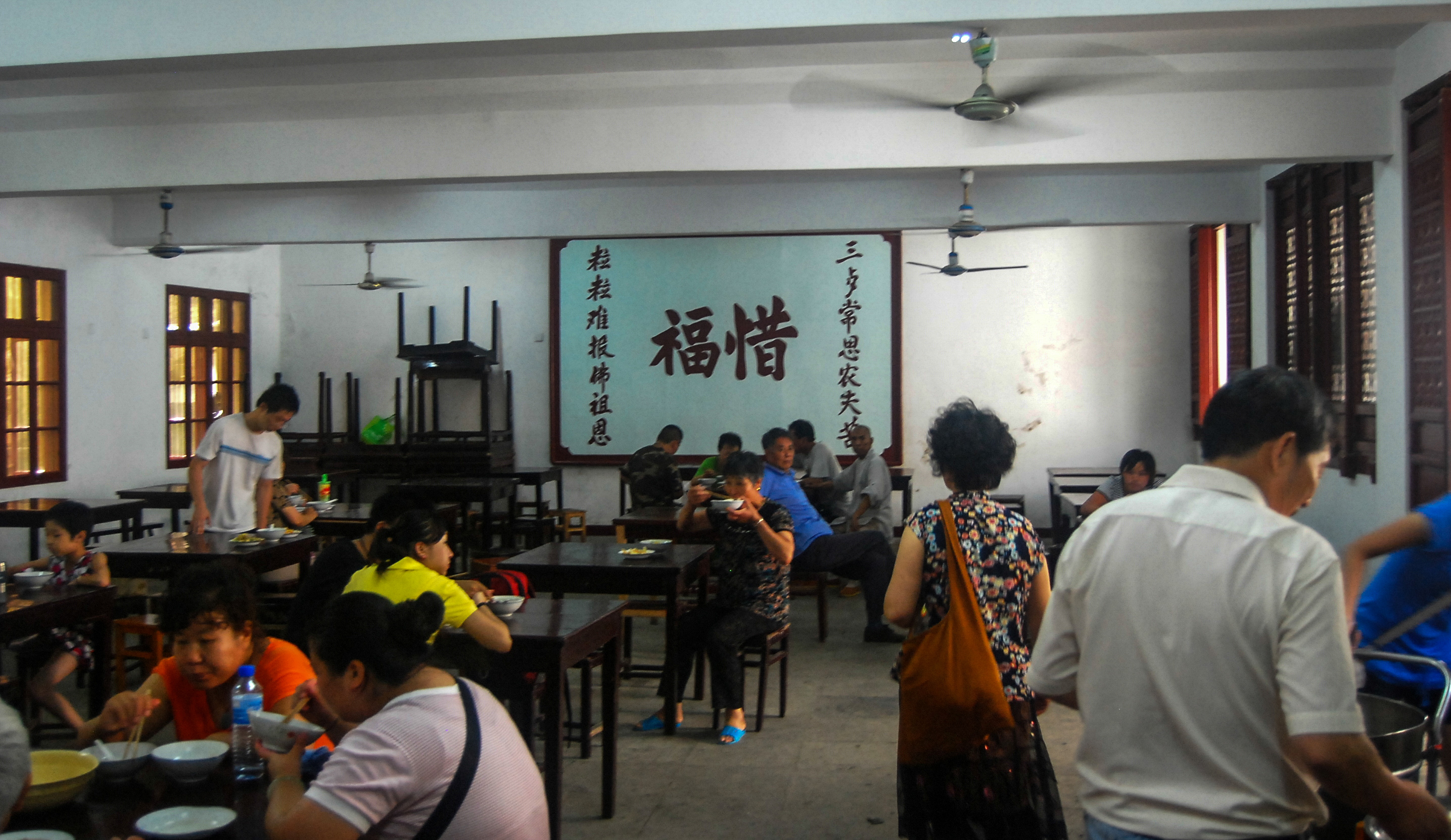
- Dining Hall at Huiji Temple.

- Location within Zhejiang

Religion
- Affiliation: Buddhism

Location
- Location: Mount Putuo, Zhoushan, Zhejiang
- Country: China
- Interactive map of Huiji Temple
- Coordinates: 30°01′04″N 122°23′52″E

Architecture
- Style: Chinese architecture
- Founder: Yuanhui (圆慧)
- Established: Ming dynasty (1368–1644)
- Completed: 1793

Huiji Temple (simplified Chinese: 慧济寺; traditional Chinese: 慧濟寺; pinyin: Huìjì Sì) is a Buddhist temple located on Mount Putuo, in Zhoushan, Zhejiang, China. Huiji Temple is commonly called the temple on the Buddha Summit and it is the third largest Buddhist temple on Mount Putuo, after Puji Temple and Fayu Temple.

== History ==
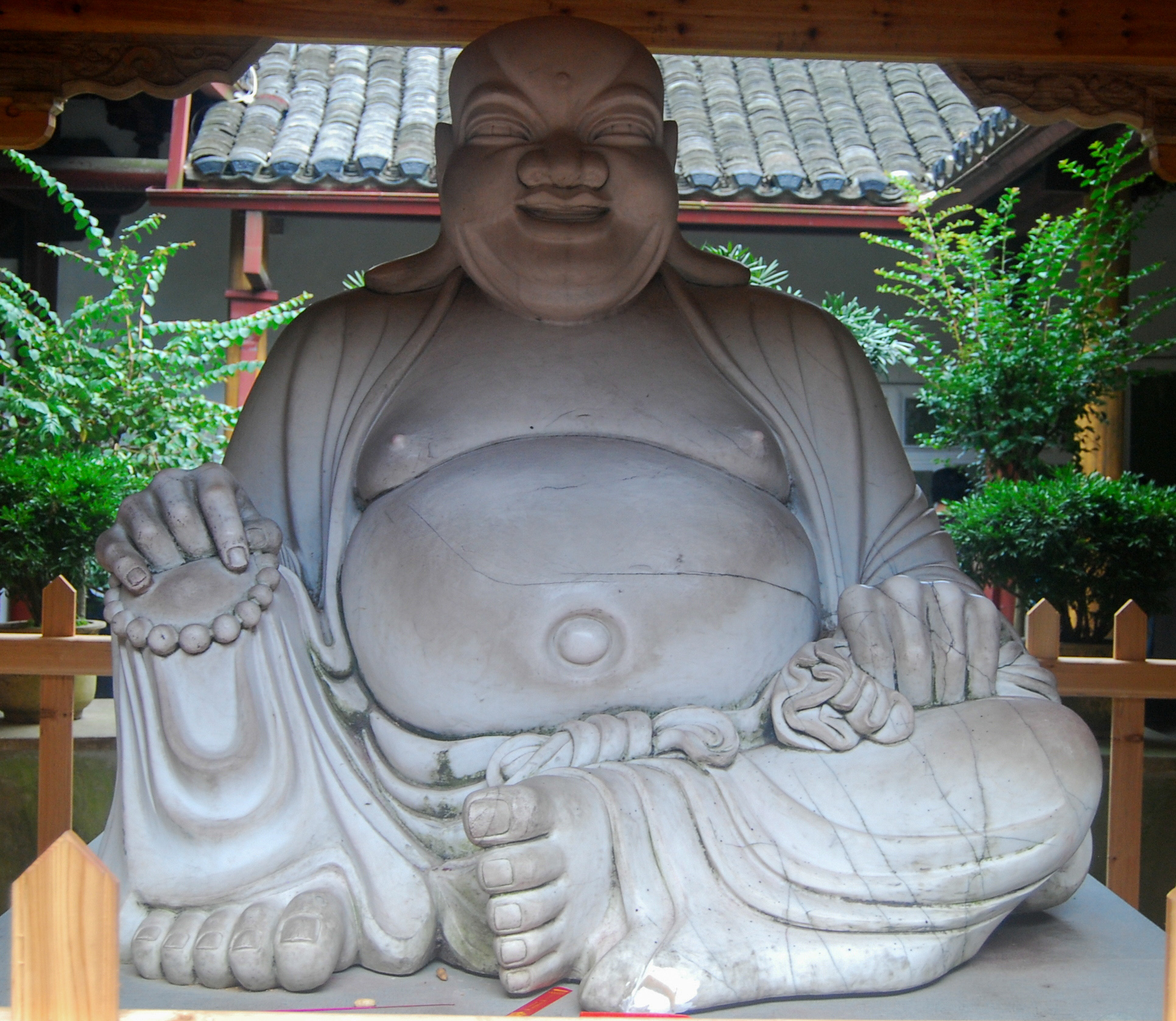
Statue of Budai at Huiji Temple.

Huiji Temple is situated at the top of Mount Putuo, so it also known as the "Buddha Summit" at an altitude of 291.3 metres (956 ft), the highest point on Mount Putuo.

Originally it was just a stone pagoda with a Buddhist statue inside. It was built in the Ming dynasty (1368–1644) by renowned monk Yuanhui (圆慧). And in 1793 during the Qianlong period of the Qing dynasty (1644–1911), halls such as the Yuantong Hall (圆通殿), Jade Emperor Hall (玉皇殿) and Dining Hall were added and formed the temple. In 1907, in the reign of Guangxu Emperor, monk Dehua (德化) brought the Tripitaka (龙藏) to the temple and at that time it became one of the largest Buddhist temples on Mount Putuo.

On May 3, 1949, Chiang Kai-shek visited Puji Temple and Huiji Temple before he settled down in Taiwan.

During the Cultural Revolution, the Gang of Four presided over the destruction of thousands of temples. The Meditation Hall was demolished by the Red Guards. The People's Liberation Army resided in the temple.

After the 3rd Plenary Session of the 11th Central Committee of the Chinese Communist Party, according to the national policy of free religious belief, the temple reactivated its religious activities. The Guanyin Hall was erected in 1988 and the Free Life Pond was established in 1992. Huiji Temple has been designated as a National Key Buddhist Temple in Han Chinese Area by the State Council of China.

== Architecture ==
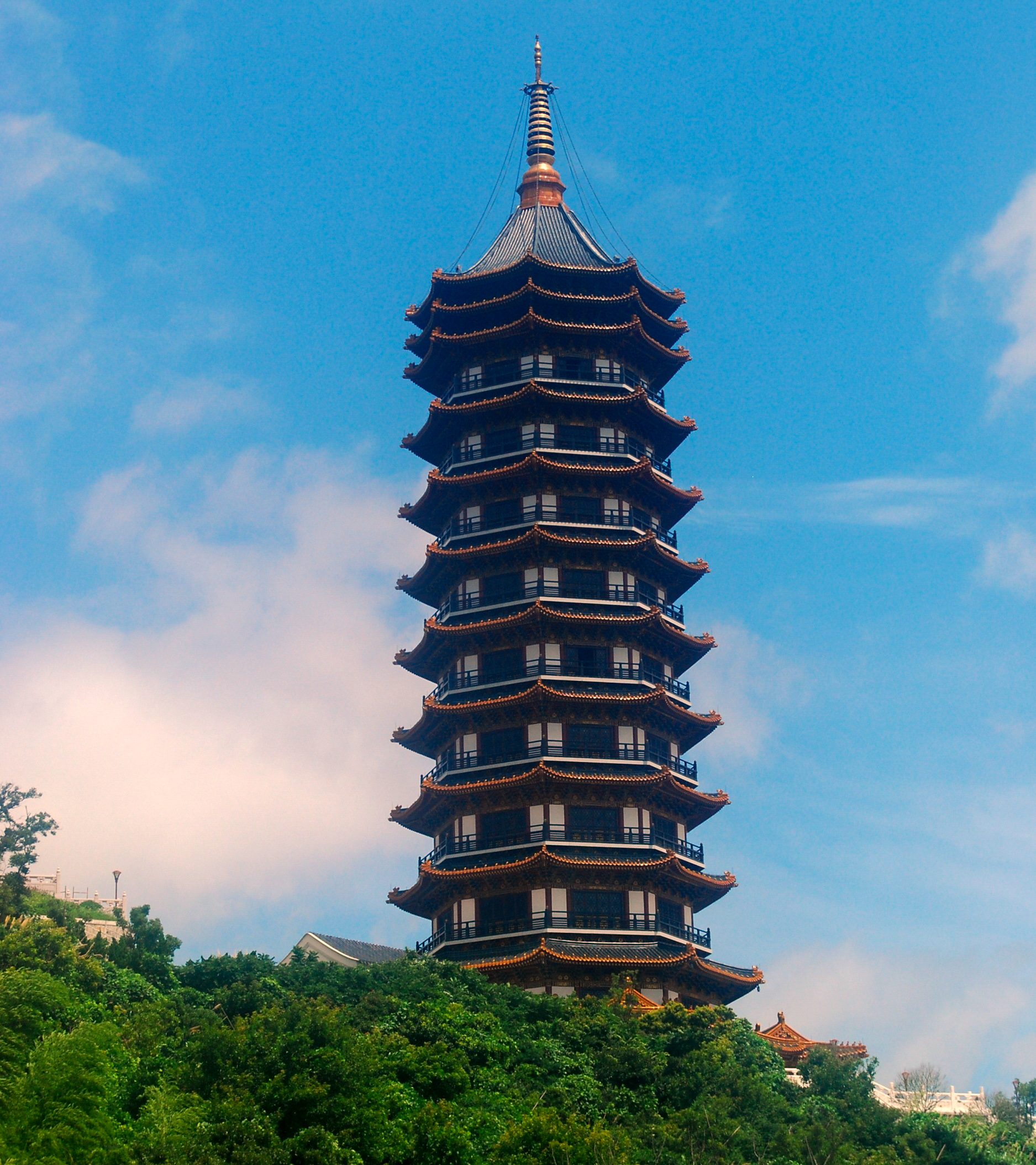
A pagoda at Huiji Temple.

Unlike other Buddhist temples, Huiji Temple has a unique layout with all major halls built along a horizontal line, a typical landscape architectural style in eastern Zhejiang. The temple occupies an area of 6,188 square metres (66,610 sq ft) and the total area including temple lands, forests and mountains is over 13,000 square metres (140,000 sq ft), and consists of 145 halls and buildings.

=== Mahavira Hall ===
The Mahavira Hall is 25 metres (82 ft) wide, 15.25 metres (50.0 ft) deep and 10.5 metres (34 ft) high. In the middle is Sakyamuni, statues of Ananda and Kassapa Buddha stand on the left and right sides of Sakyamuni's statue. The statues of the Twenty Protective Devas (二十诸天) stand on both sides of the hall. At the back of Sakyamuni is the statue of Guanyin.

=== Guanyin Hall ===
The Guanyin Hall enshrines a 2.7-metre (8 ft 10 in)-high statue of Guanyin and houses 123 stone carved statues of Guanyin based on paintings from famous painters of Tang, Song, Yuan, Ming and Qing dynasties.
