= Bodhimaṇḍala =

Type of Buddhist monastery

Bodhimaṇḍala (lit. '"circle of awakening"') is a Buddhist monastery where bhikkhus (monks) and bhikkhunis (nuns) study, practise, and teach the Buddhist dharma and strive towards bodhi (enlightenment). They are regarded as places where bodhisattvas are present, and where devotees can visit and learn from them.

Although spelled similarly, a bodhimaṇḍala is not synonymous with a bodhimaṇḍa, which is a bodhisattva's seat of awakening.

== See also ==
- Mandala
