= Fayu Temple =

Buddhist temple in Mount Putuo, China

- 法雨禅寺
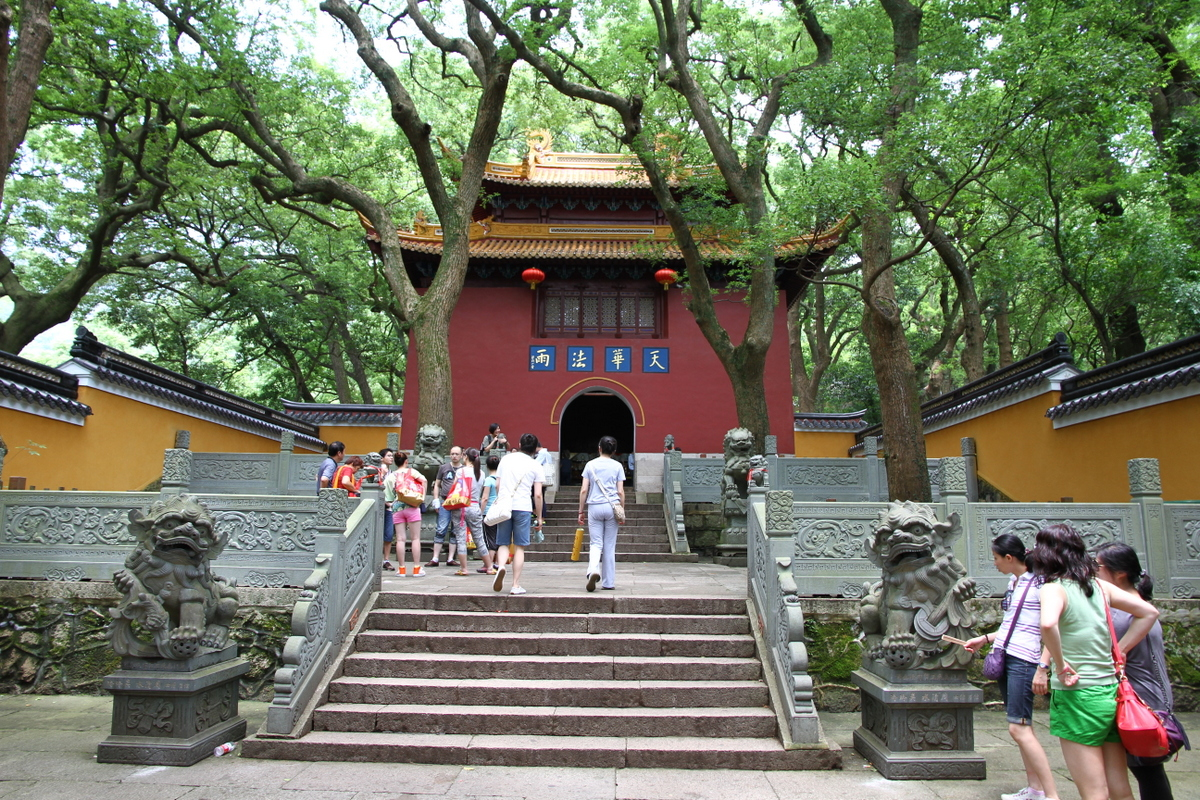
- Entrance of Fayu Temple.

- Location within Zhejiang

Religion
- Affiliation: Buddhism
- Sect: Chan Buddhism

Location
- Location: Mount Putuo, Zhejiang
- Country: China
- Interactive map of Fayu Temple
- Coordinates: 30°0′9.8″N 122°23′55.9″E

Architecture
- Style: Chinese architecture
- Founder: Dzhi Zhenrong (大智真融)
- Established: 1580
- Completed: 1699 (reconstruction)

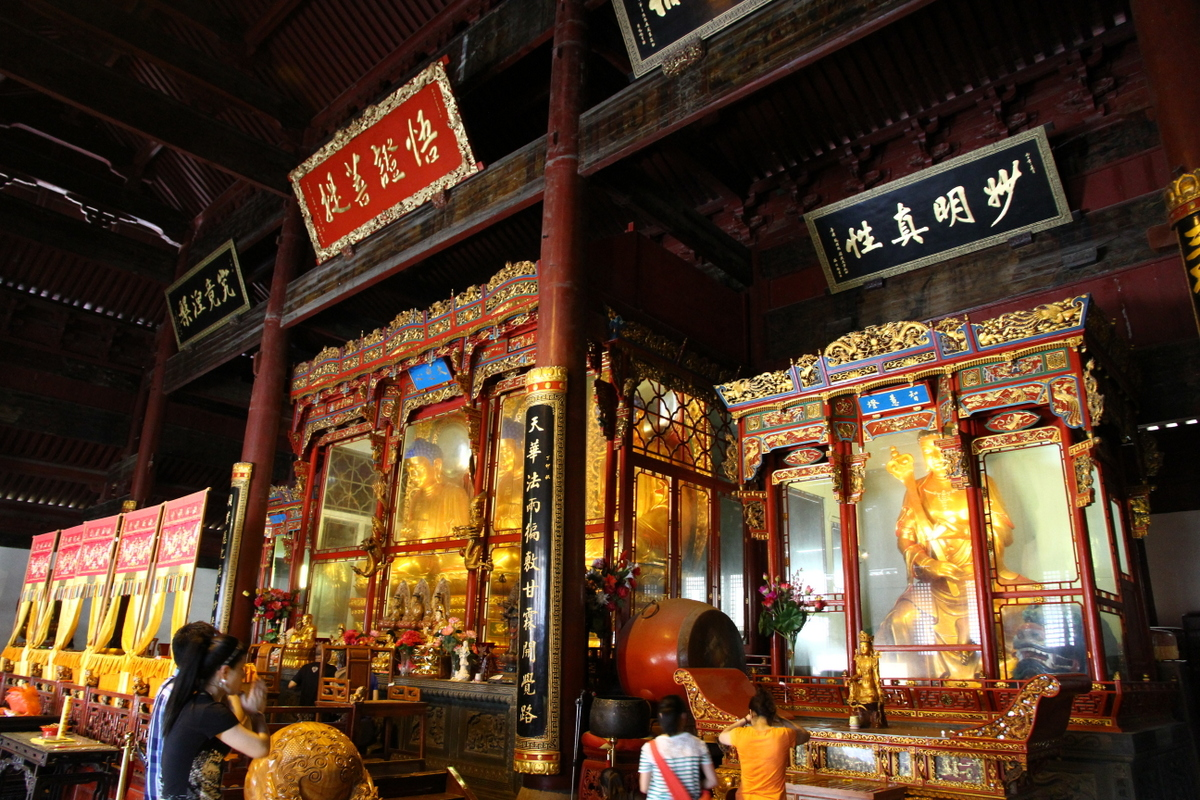
Statues of Buddhas in Fayu Temple

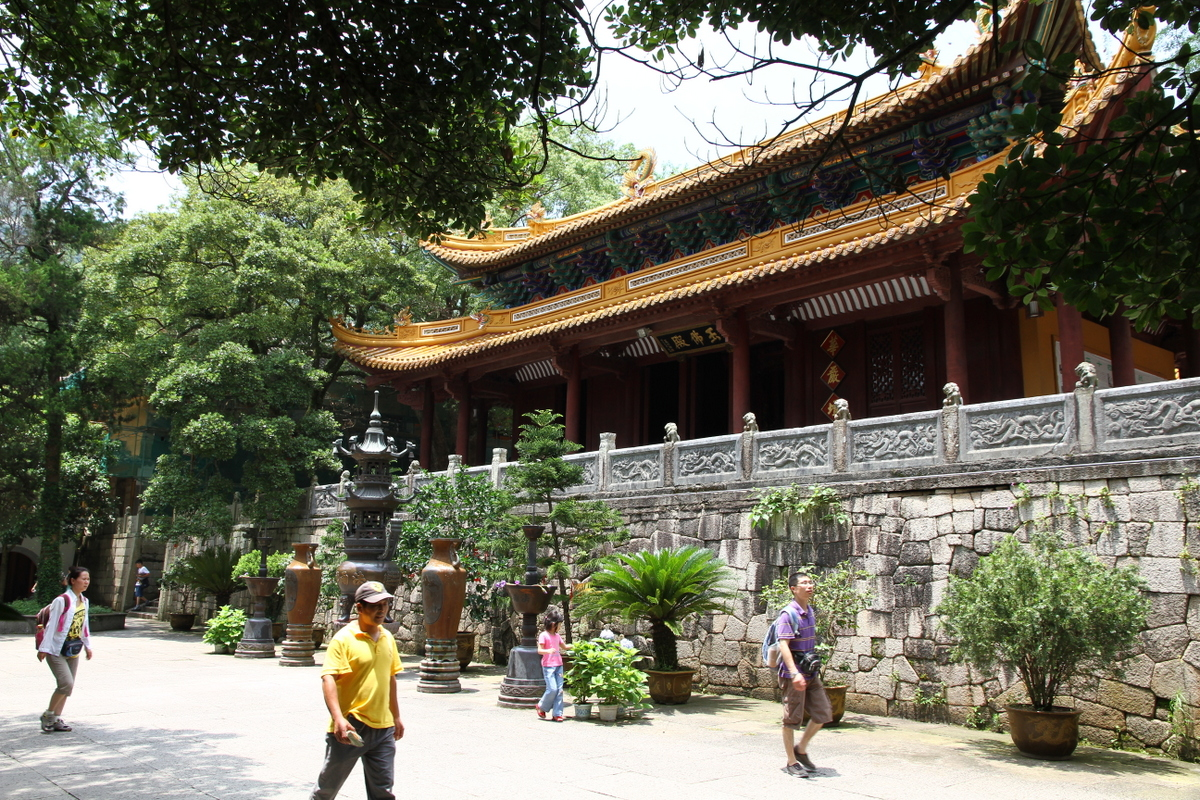
Jade Buddha hall in Fayu Temple

Fayu Temple (simplified Chinese: 法雨禅寺; traditional Chinese: 法雨禪寺; pinyin: Fǎyǔ chánsì), also called Stone Temple, is one of three major temples in Mount Putuo, Zhejiang, China. Its grand hall was rebuilt in 1699 during the Qing dynasty (1644–1911).

== History ==
Fayu Temple is the second largest temple in Mount Putuo, and a national key Buddhist temple designated by the State Council. In 1580 during the Ming dynasty (1368–1644), a monk of Macheng, named Dazhi Zhenrong (大智真融), came from western Sichuan to Mount Putuo for training. He was attracted by the local scenery and built a small sanctuary named "Ocean Tide", meaning "Buddhist Ocean Guanyin". In 1594, the governor Wu Anguo renamed it "Ocean Tide Temple" (海潮庵). It was destroyed by fire in 1598. In 1605, it was renovated and expanded. In the following year, the central government granted a plaque "National Defense Ocean Pacifying Temple" (护国镇海禅寺), as well as an inscription called "Dragon Treasure". It suffered through several wars and fire.

In 1687 during the Qing dynasty (1644–1911), the temple was refurbished and expanded again. In 1699, the Kangxi Emperor granted a plaque "Heavenly Flowers Dharma Rain" (天华法雨). Thus, it changed to "Dharma Rain Temple", or "Fayu Temple". In 1731, the Yongzheng Emperor ordered a large-scale renovation project. Thereafter, it became a famous temple in southeast China.

In 2006, the temple was added to the list of National priority protected sites as part of the 6th Batch of National Priority protected sites.

== Architecture ==
Aligned on the central axis are the Hall of Four Heavenly Kings, Bell tower, Hall of Jade Buddha, Hall of Guanyin, Hall of Imperial Tablet, Mahavira Hall, Buddhist Texts Library, and the Hall of Abbot.

=== Area ===
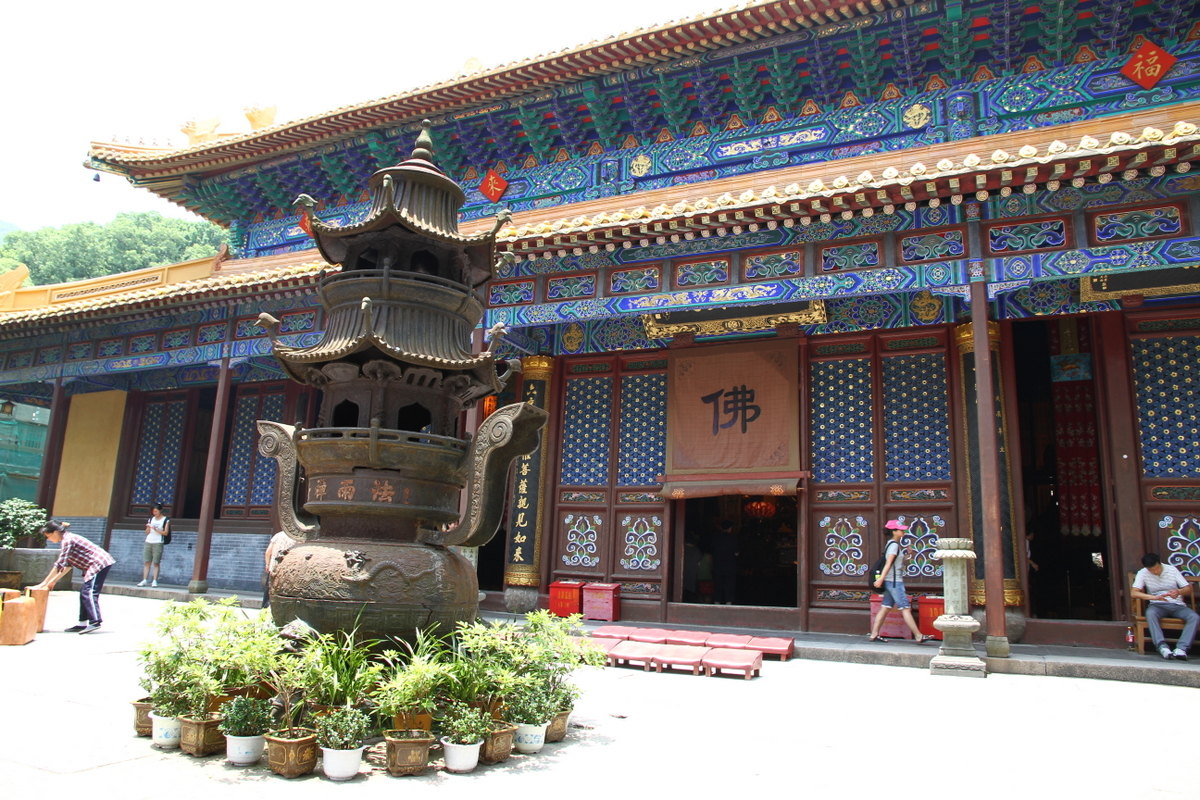
Inside Fayu Temple

The temple has a land area of 33,000 square metres (360,000 sq ft). It comprises 294 halls and rooms, with a building area of 9,300 square metres (100,000 sq ft). Along the trend of the mountain from lower to higher are Heavenly Kings Hall, Jade Buddhist Hall, Nine-Dragon Guanyin Hall, Emperor Tablet Hall, Great Grand Hall, and Fangzhang Hall.

=== Front door ===
The front door of the temple is not located along the axial line, but on the southeast corner. It is a double-eaved square pavilion, different from average front doors of Buddhist temple. The front plaque reads "Heavenly Flowers Colorful Rain", written in gold on blue ground. Inside the door, to the west is the shadowy wall. It was originally a three-dragon wall carved on bricks, with Buddhist words meaning "unbelievable power". Unfortunately, the wall was pulled down during the Cultural Revolution. In 1987, on the site erected a Nine-Dragon Wall. Built of pale stones, it is 12 metres (39 ft) wide, 9 metres (30 ft) high and 1 metre (3 ft 3 in) thick.

=== Hall of Guanyin ===
The Hall of Guanyin is also called "Nine Dragon Hall", in which the nine dragon wall is bluestone embossed with exquisite craftsmanship and life-like Chinese dragons. The entire piece came from the nine dragon palace in the Forbidden City in Beijing during the Ming dynasty (1368–1644). The Hall of Guanyin ranks in the highest architectural status of Buddhist temples. It is acclaimed as one of three treasures in Mount Putuo. Statue of Guanyin is enshrined in the center with Eighteen Arhats lining up on both sides.
