= Mount Potalaka =

Mythical abode of the Bodhisattva Avalokiteśvara

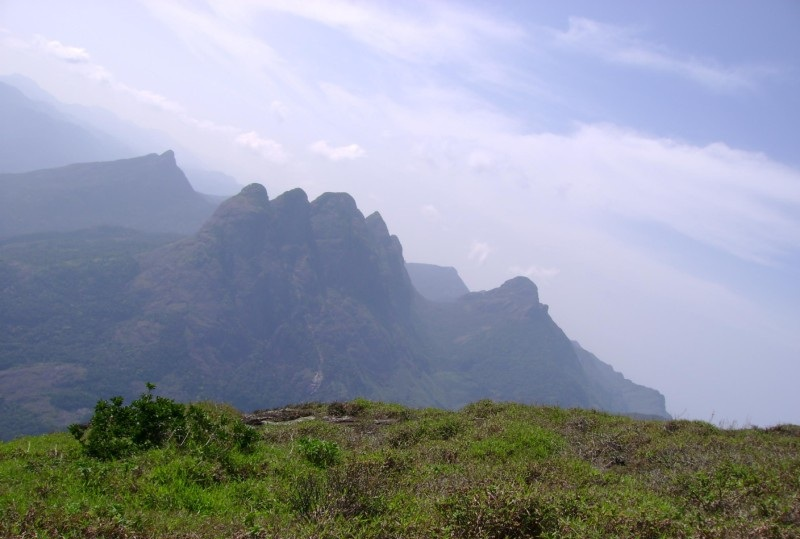
Pothigai Malai in Tamil Nadu, proposed to be the original Mount Potalaka in India

Mount Potalaka (traditional Chinese: 補陀洛伽山 or 普陀洛迦山; simplified Chinese: 补陀洛伽山 or 普陀洛伽山; pinyin: Bǔtuóluòjiā Shān or Pǔtuóluòjiā Shān, Japanese: 補陀洛 Fudaraku-san), which means "Brilliance", is the mythical dwelling of the Buddhist bodhisattva Avalokiteśvara, said to exist in the seas south of India.

== Origins ==
The mountain is first mentioned in the final chapter of the Avataṃsaka Sūtra, the Gaṇḍavyūha Sūtra, where the chapter's protagonist journeys to seek the advice of Avalokiteśvara.

The Japanese scholar Shu Hikosaka, on the basis of his study of Buddhist scriptures, ancient Tamil literary sources, as well as field surveys, proposed the hypothesis that the ancient Mount Potalaka, the residence of Avalokiteśvara described in the Gaṇḍavyūha Sūtra and Xuanzang’s Great Tang Records on the Western Regions, is the real mountain Potikai or Potiyil situated near the town of Ambasamudram in the Tirunelveli District of the Indian state of Tamil Nadu. The mountain is located in an area within the Singampatti Zamindar Forest. Shu also says that Mount Potiyil/Potalaka has been a sacred place for the people of South India from time immemorial.

With the spread of Buddhism in the region beginning at the time of the great king Aśoka in the third century BCE, it became a holy place also for Buddhists who gradually became dominant as a number of their hermits settled there. The local people, though, mainly remained followers of Hinduism.

== Local traditions ==
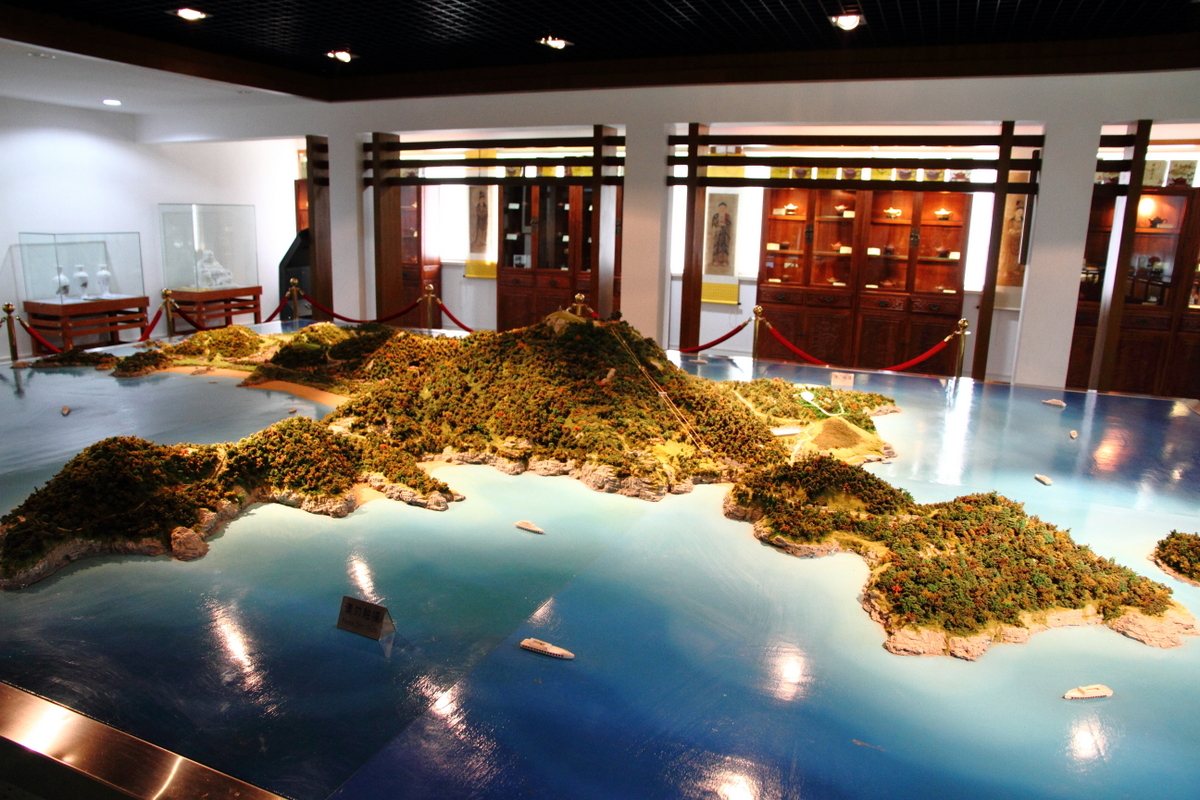
Model of Mount Putuo island

Later Japanese Buddhists, such as the Japanese Yogacara monk Jōkei, espoused aspiring rebirth on Mount Potalaka as an easier way to attain progress on the Buddhist path than the more well-known pure land of Amitābha.

Places named after Mount Potalaka include:

- Mount Putuo in Zhejiang
- Putuo Zongcheng Temple in Hebei
- Potala Palace in Tibet
- Naksansa in South Korea
- Futarasan jinja in Nikkō
- Fudarakusan-ji in Nachikatsuura

== See also ==
- Patala
- Naraka
