= Bodhimaṇḍa =

Buddhist term for the "position of awakening"; a seat of the essence of enlightenment

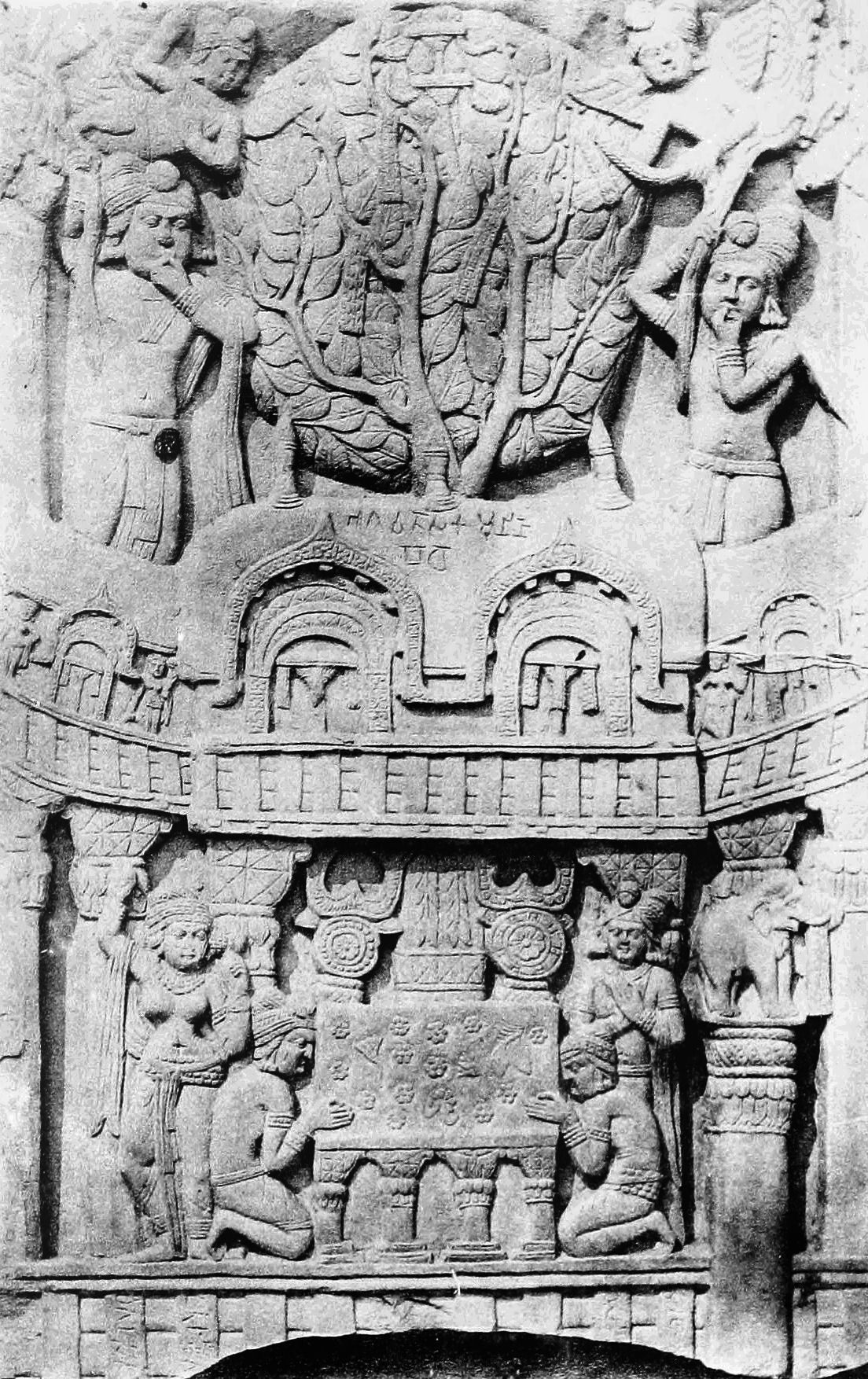
Bharhut relief with the Vajrasana (similar to the Anagarika Dharmapala photograph with its supporting columns), and the Mahabodhi Temple around the Bodhi Tree (2nd century BCE).

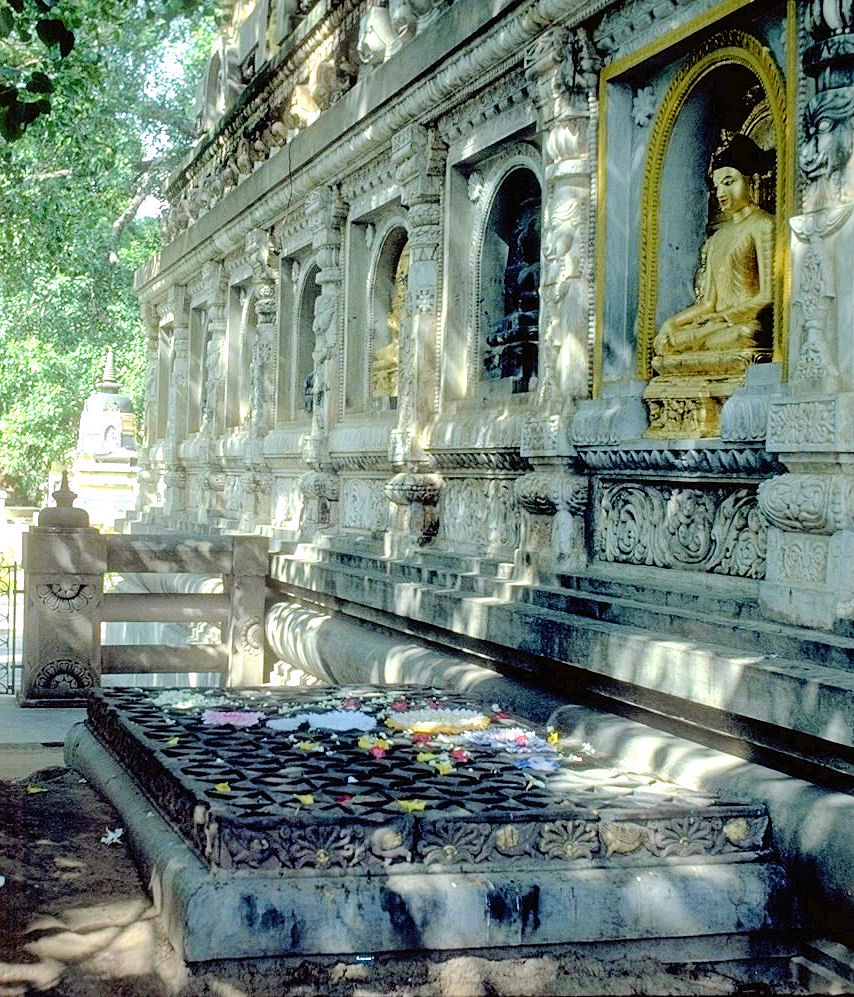
The Diamond Throne, bodhimanda of Gautama Buddha

Bodhimaṇḍa (Sanskrit and Pali) or daochang (traditional Chinese: 道場; ; pinyin: dàochǎng; J. dōjō; T. byang chub snying po) is a term used in Buddhism meaning the "seat of awakening" or "platform of enlightenment". According to Haribhadra, it is "a place used as a seat, where the essence of enlightenment is present". In our world, this refers to the specific spot in Bodh Gaya under the bodhi tree, where Shakyamuni Buddha attained enlightenment, but technically, it can be used to refer to the place of awakening of any Buddha or bodhisattva.

In Buddhist cosmology, the Buddha's bodhimaṇḍa is also said to be the center or navel of the world, i.e. an axis mundi which connects the divine and profane worlds.

Regarding the bodhimaṇḍas of various bodhisattvas, they are said to be located in various places throughout Asia and have become places of pilgrimage for Mahayana Buddhists and numerous temples and monasteries have grown around them. One Indian example is Mount Potalaka, a sacred mountain in India, traditionally held to be Avalokiteśvara's bodhimaṇḍa.

In Chinese Buddhism, there are four mountains that are regarded as bodhisattva bodhimaṇḍas. These four sacred places are:

- Mount Putuo for Guanyin (Avalokiteśvara), the bodhisattva of Compassion (Chinese: 觀自在菩薩, 觀世音菩薩, 觀音菩薩; pinyin: Guānzìzài Púsà, Guānshìyīn Púsà, Guānyīn Púsà)
- Mount Emei for Samantabhadra, the bodhisattva of practice (Chinese: 普賢菩薩 普贤菩萨; pinyin: Pǔxián Púsà)
- Mount Wutai for Mañjuśrī, the bodhisattva of wisdom (Chinese: 文殊菩薩, 文殊师利菩薩, 曼殊室利菩薩, 妙吉祥菩薩; pinyin: Wénshū Púsà, Wénshūshīlì Púsà, Mànshūshìlì Púsà, Miàojíxiáng Púsà)
- Mount Jiuhua for Kṣitigarbha, the bodhisattva of the great vow (Chinese: 地藏菩薩 地藏菩萨; pinyin: Dìzàng Púsà)

Bodhimaṇḍas are regularly visited by Buddhist pilgrims, and some have gone on to become popular secular tourist destinations as well. In many forms of Buddhism, it is believed that bodhimaṇḍas are spiritually pure places, or otherwise conducive to meditation and enlightenment.

== Famous bodhimaṇḍas in India ==
- The Vajrasana, Bodh Gaya: Gautama Buddha
- Mount Potalaka: Avalokiteśvara Bodhisattva

== Famous bodhimaṇḍas in China ==
- Mount Putuo: Avalokiteśvara Bodhisattva
- Mount Emei: Samantabhadra Bodhisattva
- Mount Wutai: Mañjuśrī Bodhisattva
- Mount Jiuhua: Kṣitigarbha Bodhisattva

== See also ==
- Dojo and dojang, two types of buildings whose names are written with the same Chinese characters used for daochang
