= Qita Temple =

Buddhist temple in Yinzhou, China

- 七塔寺
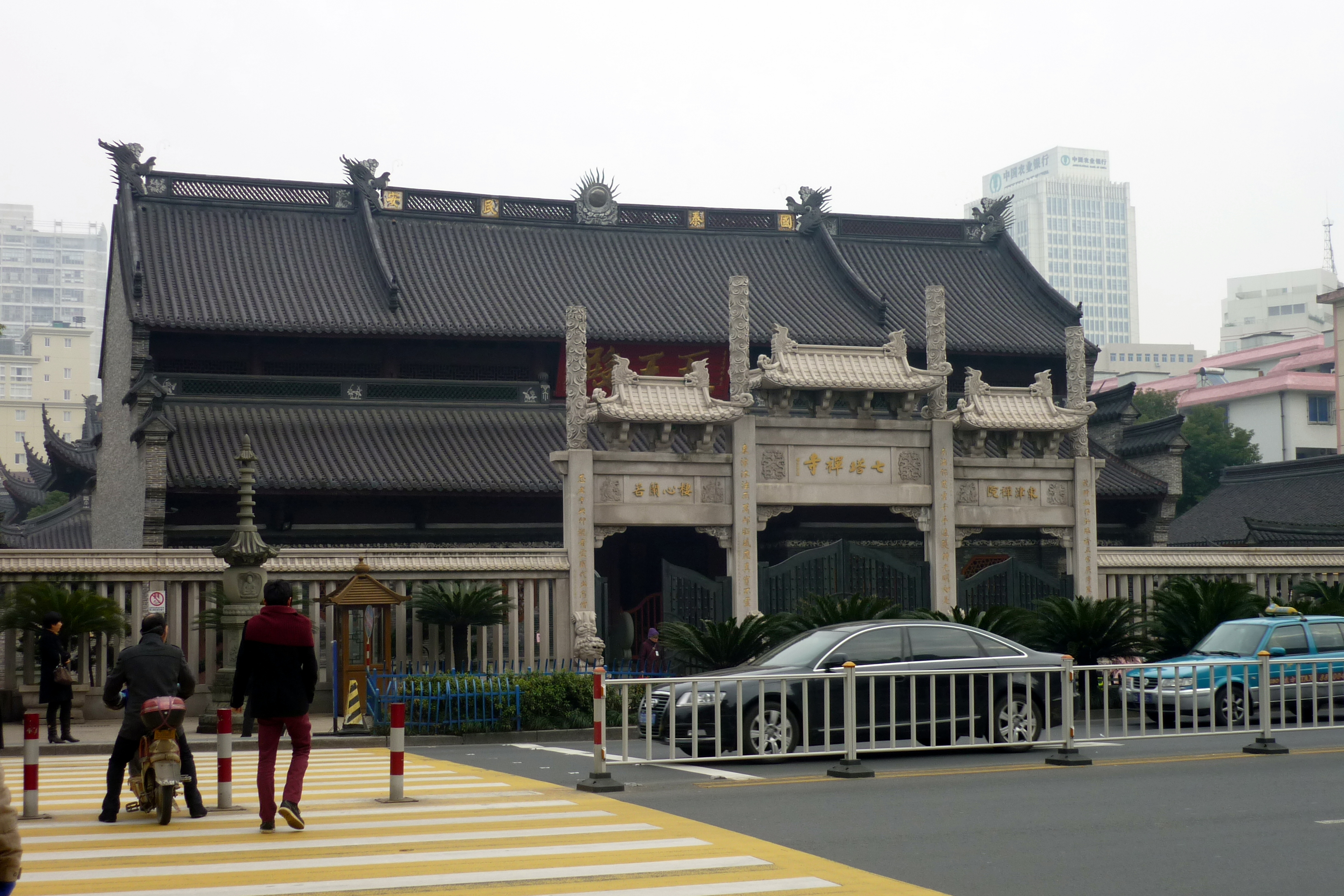
- Qita Temple

- Location within Zhejiang

Religion
- Affiliation: Buddhism
- Sect: Chan Buddhism

Location
- Location: Yinzhou District of Ningbo, Zhejiang, China
- Coordinates: 29°52′05″N 121°33′49″E

Architecture
- Style: Chinese architecture
- Founder: Xinjing Zanghuan
- Established: 858
- Completed: 1980 (reconstruction)

The Qita Chan Buddhist Temple (Chinese: 七塔寺; pinyin: Qītǎ Sì), or Seven Pagodas Temple, is a Chan Buddhist temple located in the Yinzhou District of Ningbo, Zhejiang, China. It is the only major Chan Buddhist temple complex within the city proper of Ningbo.

It is listed as a "Han Chinese Buddhist Temple of National Significance". Since 2011 it has been listed as a relic being protected by the provincial government.

The history of the temple dates back to the Tang dynasty (618–907) in 858 A.D. It was first called the Dongjin Chan Courtyard (东津禅院). The temple has gone through multiple cycles of destruction and re-building. At the beginning of the Qing dynasty (1644–1911) seven pagodas were known to be placed in front of the entrance of the temple. Since then it has been given its present name. During the Qing dynasty the temple was the site of the dissemination of the Linji school of Buddhism.

The temple was badly damaged during the Cultural Revolution; it was eventually restored and reopened in 1980.

In April 2017, the temple established a Buddhist library which is opened to public.

The temple is accessible via Line 1 of Ningbo Rail Transit; the nearest station is Jiangxia Bridge East Station.
