= Puji Temple =

Buddhist temple in Zhejiang, China

- 普济寺
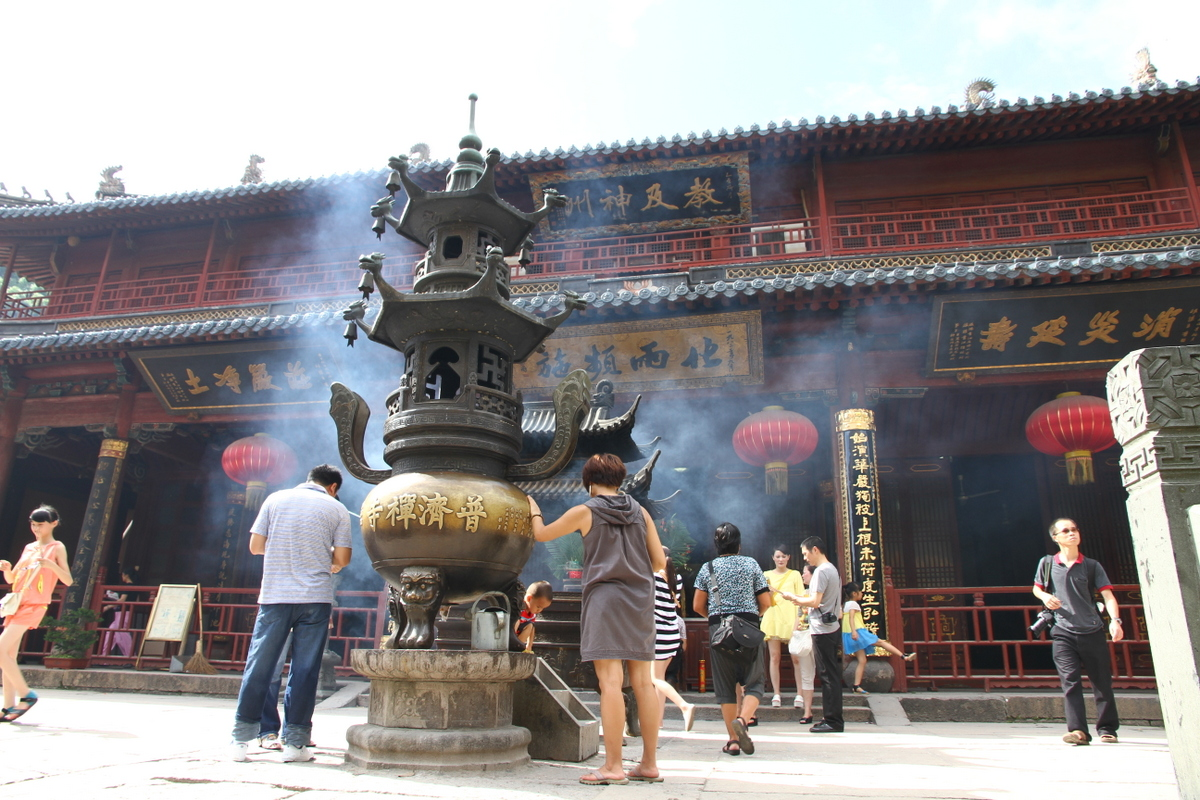
- A hall of Puji Temple.

- Location within Zhejiang

Religion
- Affiliation: Buddhism

Location
- Location: Mount Putuo, Zhejiang
- Country: China
- Coordinates: 29°59′51″N 122°22′30″E

Architecture
- Style: Chinese architecture
- Founder: Hui'e
- Established: 916

Puji Temple (simplified Chinese: 普济禅寺; traditional Chinese: 普濟禪寺; pinyin: Pǔjì Chánsì; lit. 'Chan Temple of Universal Salvation') is a Buddhist temple located on the island of Putuoshan in Zhoushan, Zhejiang, China.

== History ==
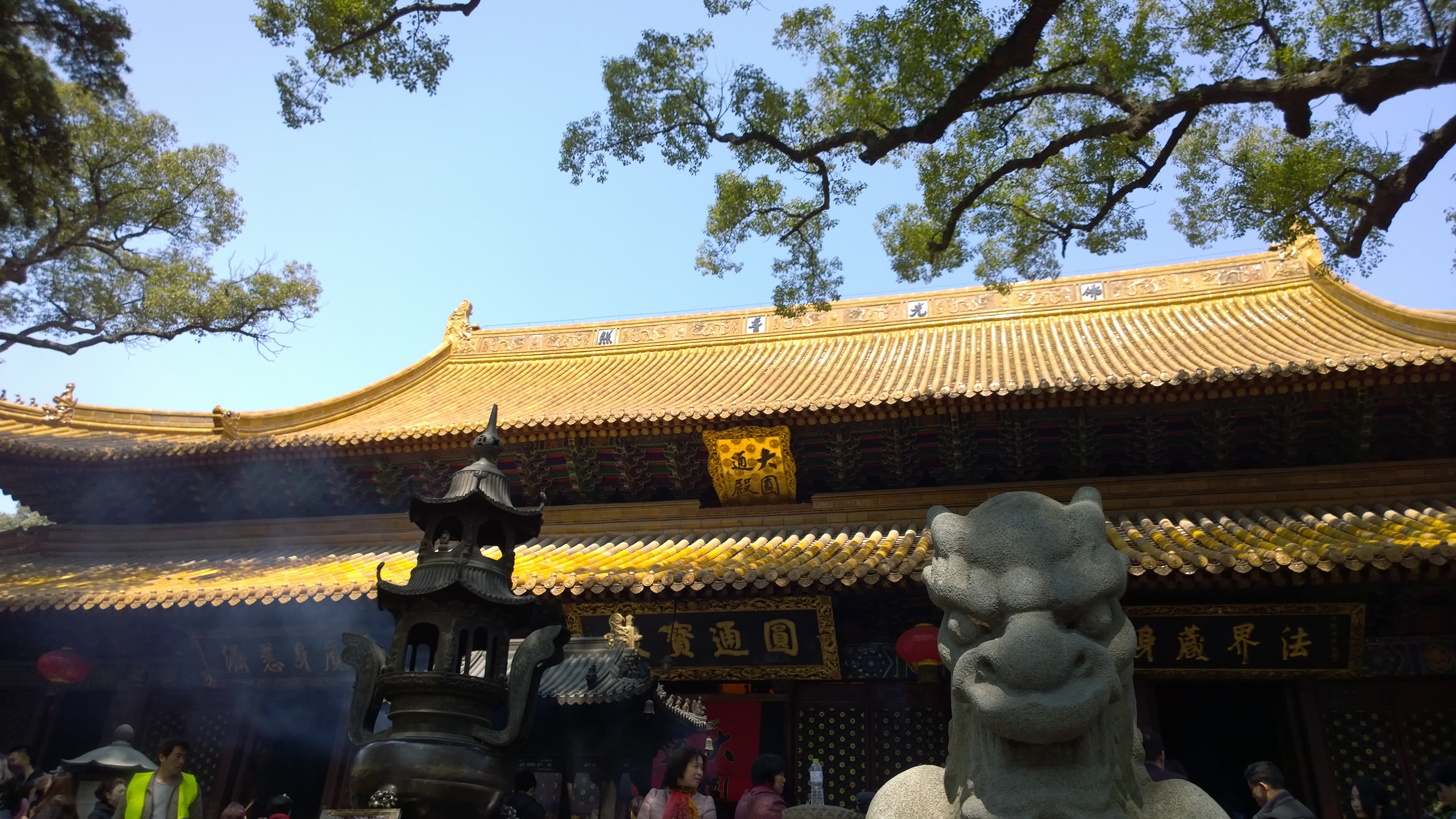
Yuantong Hall.

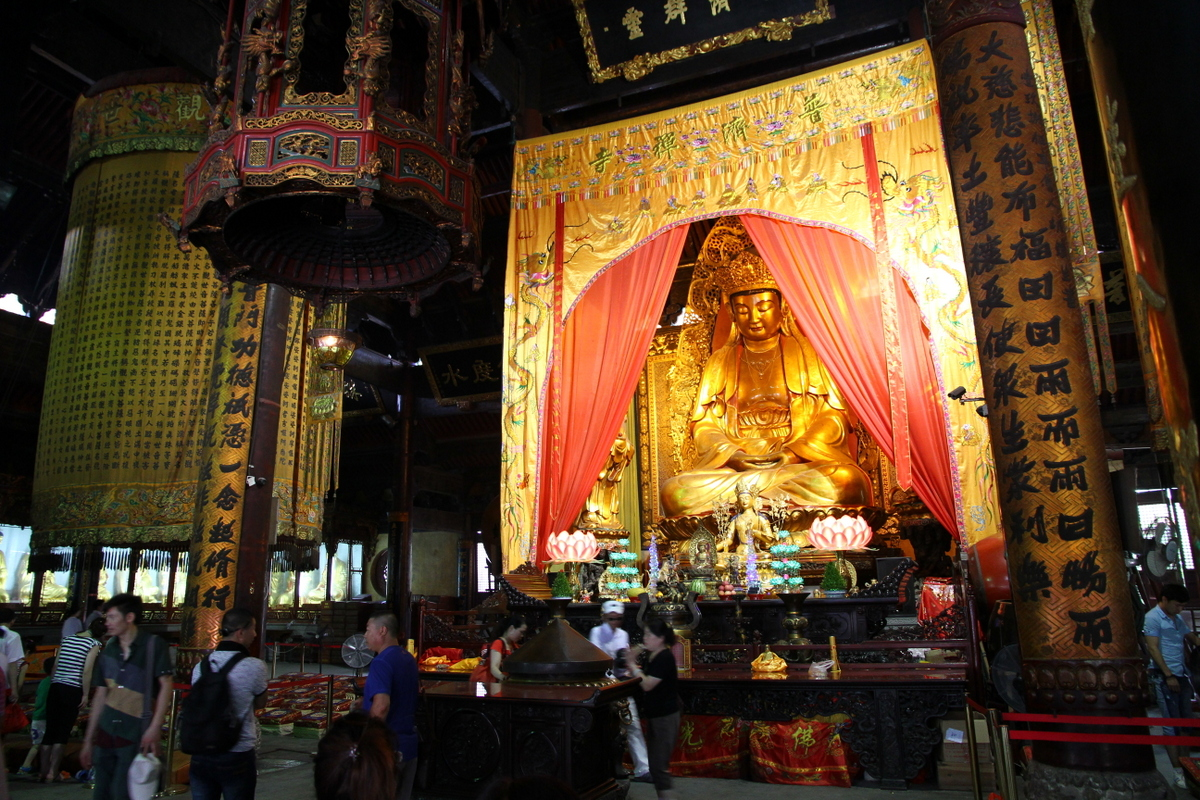
Statue of Avalokiteśvara Bodhisattva in Puji Temple

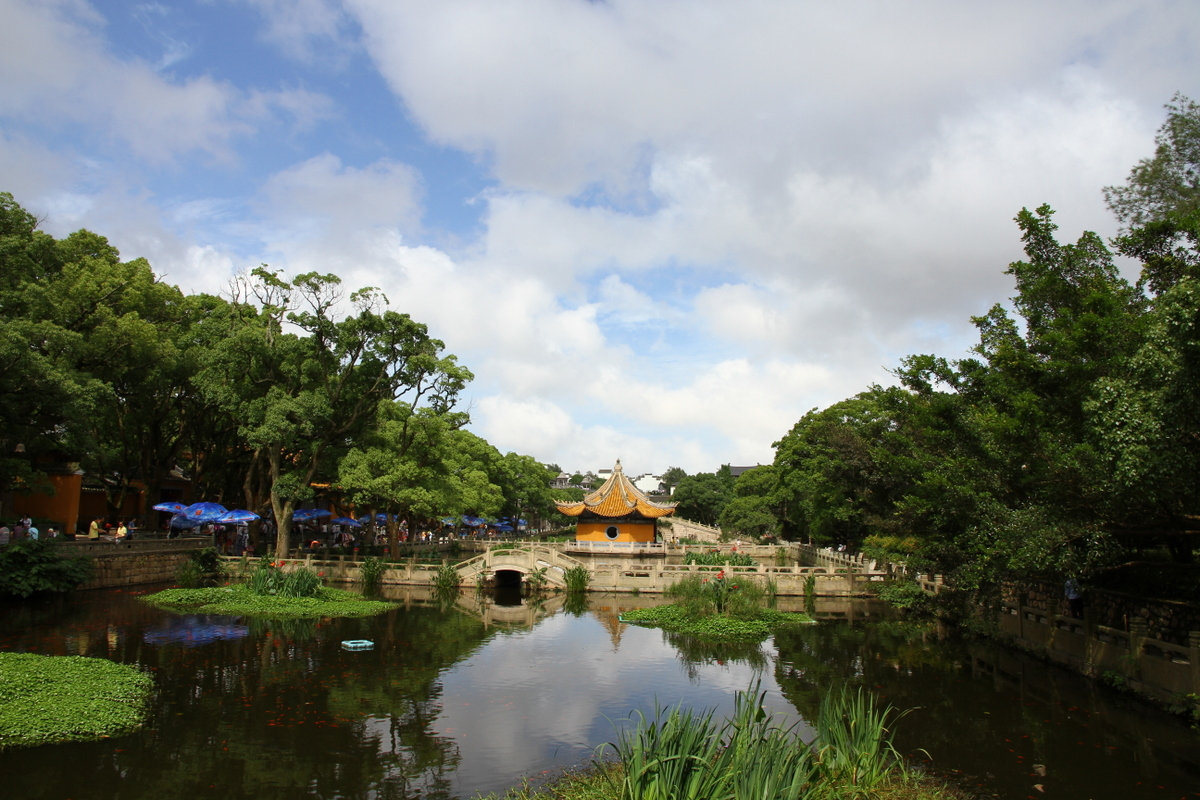
Lake and pavilions in front of Puji Temple

=== Five dynasties ===
In 916, in the 2nd year of Zhenming period (915–921) of the Later Liang dynasty (907–923), when Japanese monk Hui'e took a statue of Guanyin he invited from Mount Wutai in Shanxi, he was blocked by windstorm in Mount Putuo, which made him think of that Guanyin didn't want to go to the east. Hui'e gone ashore and left the statue to a resident surnamed Zhang to enshrine. He also built the "Unwilling Guanyin Temple" (不肯去观音院; bu ken qu guanyin yuan).

=== Song dynasty ===
In 1080, during the Song dynasty (960–1279), Emperor Shenzong renamed the temple "Baotuo Guanyin Temple" (宝陀观音寺; bao tuo guanyin si). Shenzong donated lands to the temple, and a new monk was ordained every year. (After the temple was renamed, the old name for the temple was still used to refer to a nearby hill, purple bamboo forest (紫竹林; zi zhu lin), on which a 20-metre-tall (66 ft) Guanyin now stands.) The monks studied Buddhism and the temple slowly prospered.

In 1214, still in the Song dynasty, Emperor Ningzong donated tens of thousands of min (lines of cash) to the temple and presented them with a sign reading "Yuantong Hall" (圆通宝殿; yuan tong bao dian; 'General Funds Hall').

=== Yuan dynasty ===
In 1298 by order of Emperor Chengzong of the Yuan dynasty (1271–1368), Li Ying (李英) repaired the temple, completing the work in 1301. The monks were given over 4000 mu (2.7 km^{2}) of land, and 20 min of government funds. In 1299, Yishan Yining, the abbot of the temple, was appointed the director of Buddhist teaching for the region (江浙释教总统; jiangzhe shijiao zongtong) and was sent as an emissary to Japan by the emperor.

In the winter of 1313, the Emperor Renzong's mother sent an envoy to present the temple with 868 metal bars and three qing of land, and to make offerings.

In 1327, Emperor Taiding presented the temple with 1000 metal bars and 2 qing 26 mu of land.

=== Ming dynasty ===
In 1386, during the Ming dynasty (1368–1644), Duke Tang (汤和) was asked to come to the mainland to advise the Emperor. He brought with him 30,000 people from 46 islands, including the monks of Putuoshan. At the same time, Duke Tang ordered the burning of 300 temples on Putuoshan. He also moved a large statue of Guanyin to "Xixin Temple" (郡东栖心寺; jun dong xi xin si) on the mainland, which was then renamed "Putuo" (普陀). (The temple is now known as Qita Temple. It is located in Ningbo.)

In 1515, the Buddhist community began to recover through donations and alms.

In 1553, the Ming government under the Jiajing Emperor moved the monks and destroyed temples once more.

In 1572, a monk named Zhen Song (真松) came to Putuoshan to help rebuild it to its former glory.

In 1574, a monk named Zhen Biao (真表) wanted to ascend the mountain to locate the site of old Bao Guo Si (宝陀寺), destroyed 200 years earlier, but was not allowed. Despite this, he still ascended the mountain and located the old site of the temple, and managed to rebuild a small monastery, only to have it destroyed by a military commander Xu Jingxing (徐景星). Afterwards, Zhou Liangbin (周良宾), a Ningbo government official, had Zhen Biao and a group of nuns punished. Fours years later, Zhen Biao was made abbot. He had the Hall of Heavenly Kings (云会堂) and one other hall built.

In 1605, in the 33rd year of Wanli period (1573–1620), Wanli Emperor named it "Huguo Yongshou Putuo Chan Temple" (护国永寿普陀禅寺).

== Architecture ==
Puji Temple is the largest Buddhist temple in Mount Putuo, the temple is also the main temple enshrining Guanyin. It is known as "Front Temple" since it located in the southern foot of Lingjiu Peak. Along the central axis are Shanmen, Tianwang Hall, Yuantong Hall, Cangjing Ge, etc. There are over 600 halls and rooms on both sides, including Hall of Guru, Hall of Arhat, Dining Hall and Meditation Hall.

=== Yuantong Hall ===
Yuantong Hall (圆通宝殿) is the main hall to enshrine Guanyin. It was built in 1214 during the Southern Song dynasty and rebuilt in 1693 during the reign of Kangxi Emperor of the Qing dynasty. The hall is 18 metres (59 ft) high, 42 metres (138 ft) wide and 24 metres (79 ft) deep. It is single-layer and double-eave wooden structure and covered with yellow glazed tiles on the roof with solemn and elegant cornices. A 8.8-metre (29 ft) statue of Guanyin is enshrined in the hall. He wears heavenly crown which has a statue of Amitabha posing in mudras on it. On the two sides of the hall sit 32 statues of Guanyin, representing his various appearances in the world.

=== Multi-Treasure Pagoda ===
The Multi-Treasure Pagoda (多宝塔) was built in 1334 during the Yuan dynasty (1271–1368). It is the earliest existing architecture in Mount Putuo.

=== Free Life Pond ===
The Free Life Pond in front of Puji Temple is reputed for the five-color twin lotus. The Yongshou Bridge (永寿桥) was built in 1606 in the late Ming dynasty (1368–1644).
