= Mount Putuo =

Island in Zhoushan, China

Coordinates: 30°00′35″N 122°23′06″E

- "Mount Putuo" in Chinese characters
- Chinese: 普陀山
- Literal meaning: (from Sanskrit) "Mount Potalaka"
Transcriptions
Standard Mandarin
- Hanyu Pinyin: Pǔtuó shān
- Wade–Giles: P'u^{3}-t'o^{2} shan^{1}
- IPA: [pʰùtʰwǒ ʂán]
Wu
- Romanization: Phù-dou sẽ
Yue: Cantonese
- Yale Romanization: Póu-tòh sāan
- Jyutping: Pou2-to4 saan1
Southern Min
- Tâi-lô: Phóo-tôo san

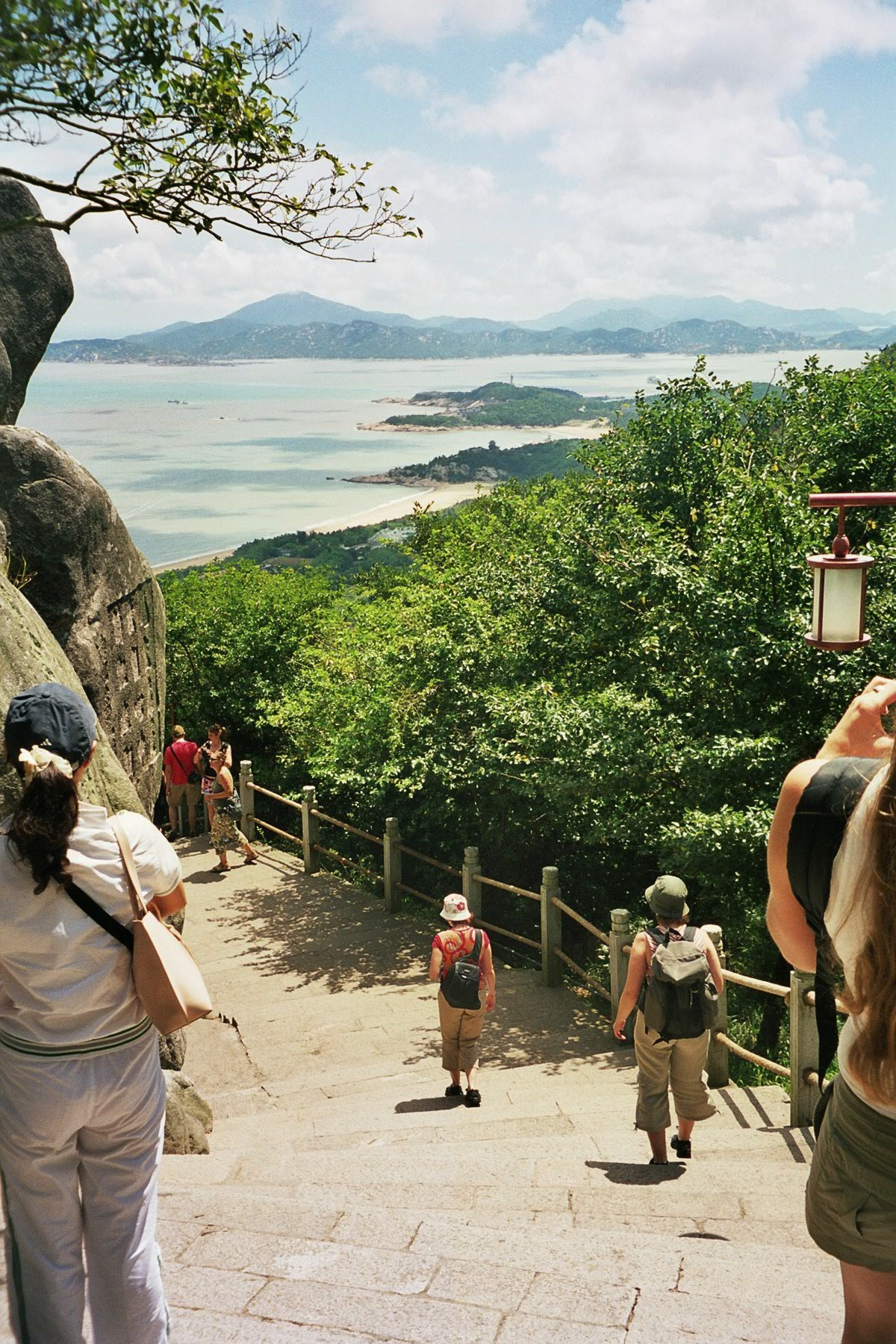
View of Mount Putuo

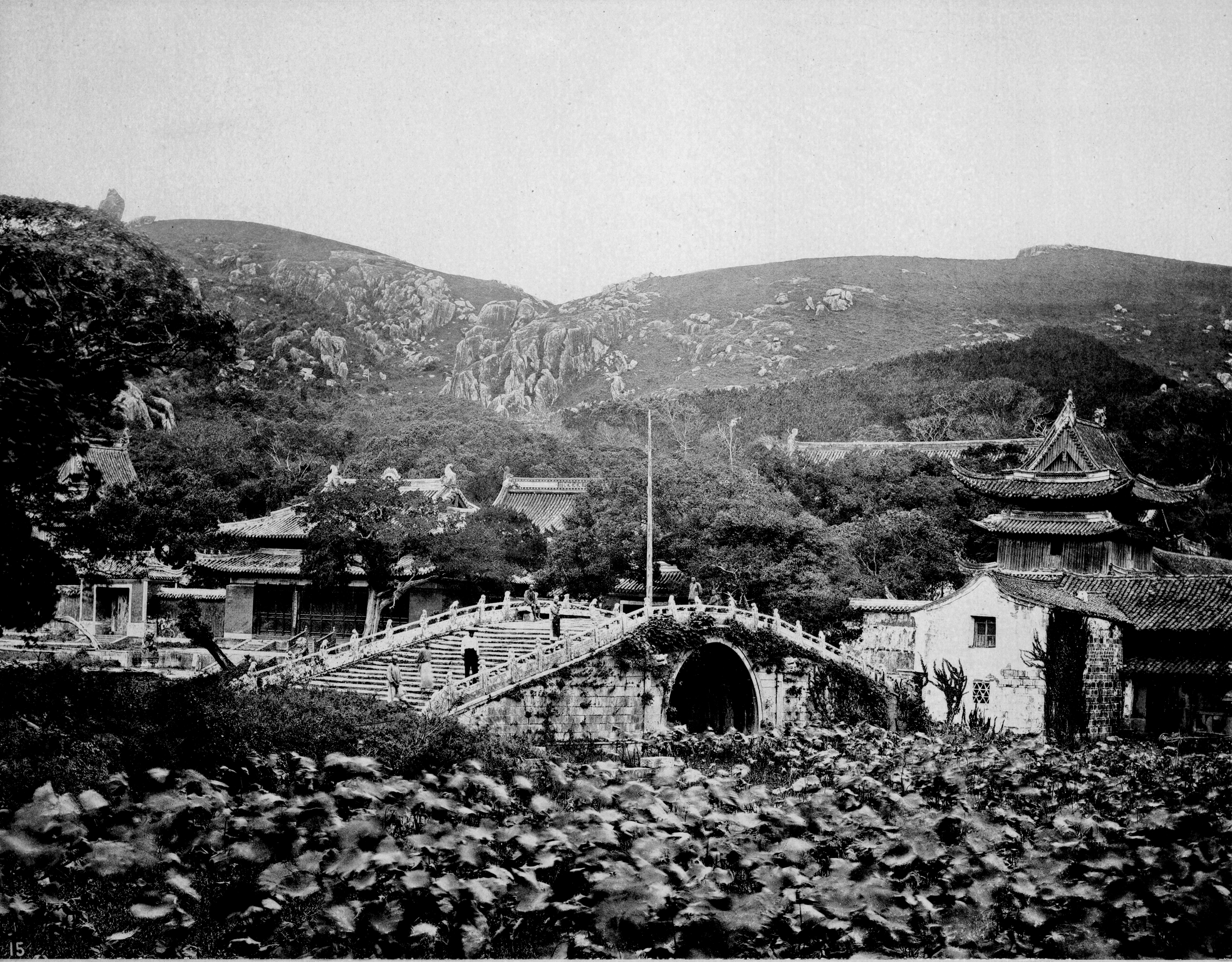
Photograph by Scottish photographer John Thomson, 1867.

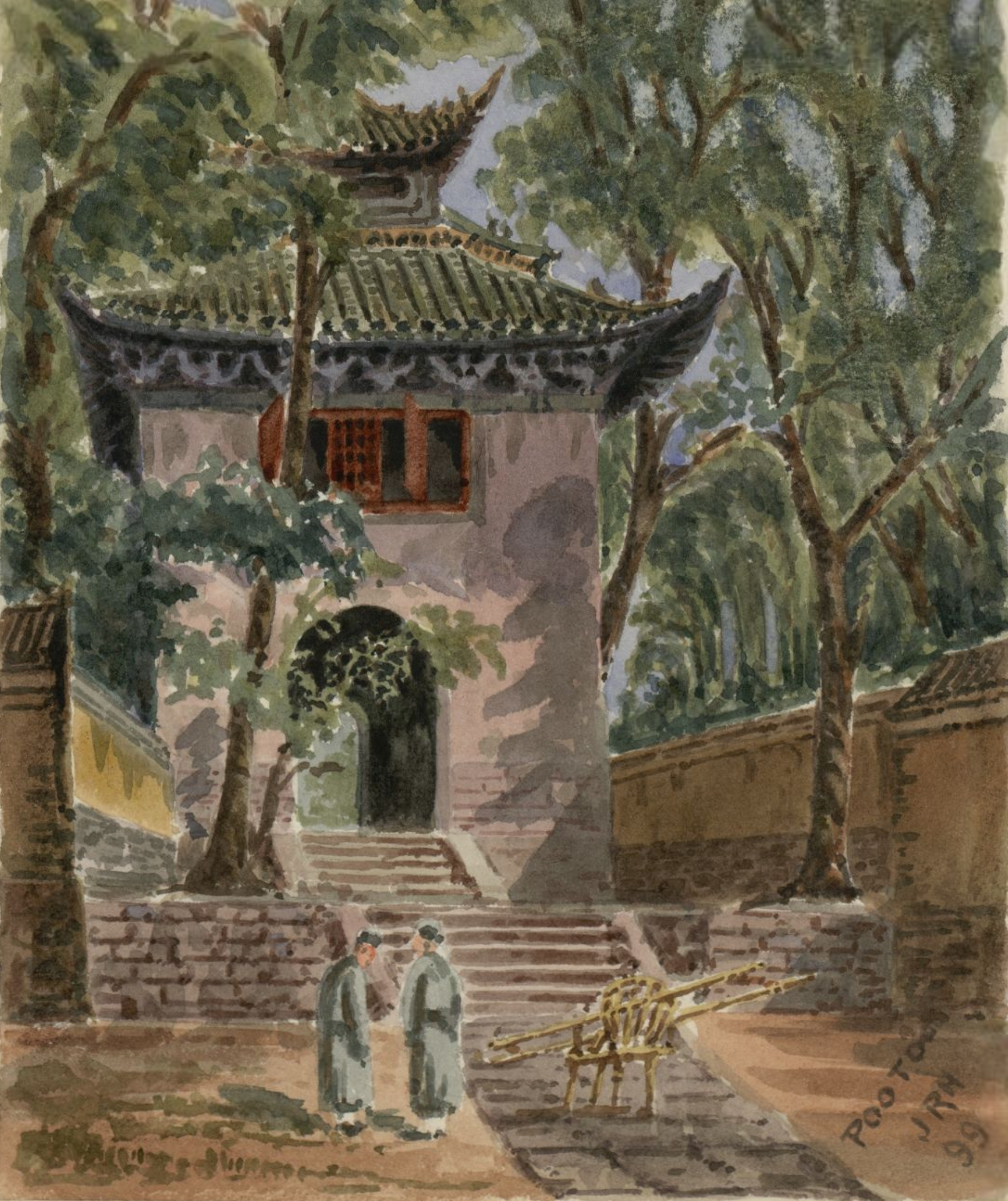
Building on Mount Putuo, 1899

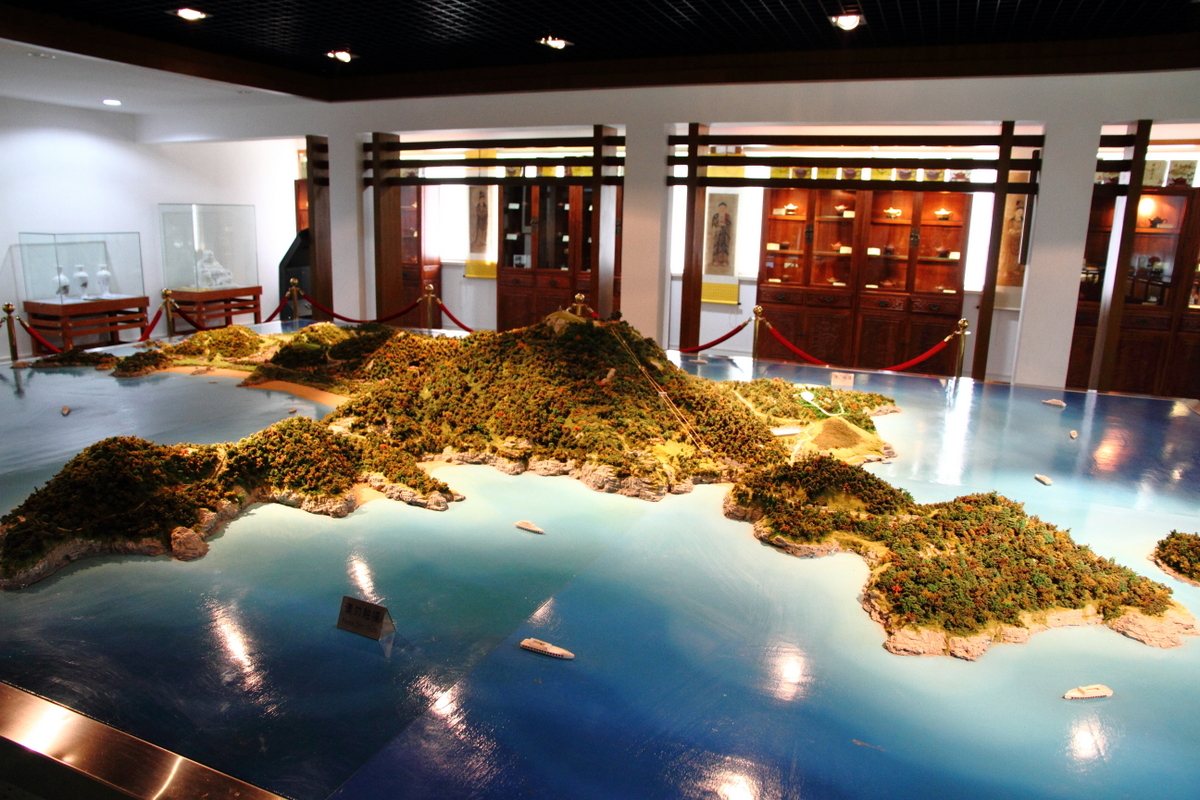
Plan of the Mount Putuo

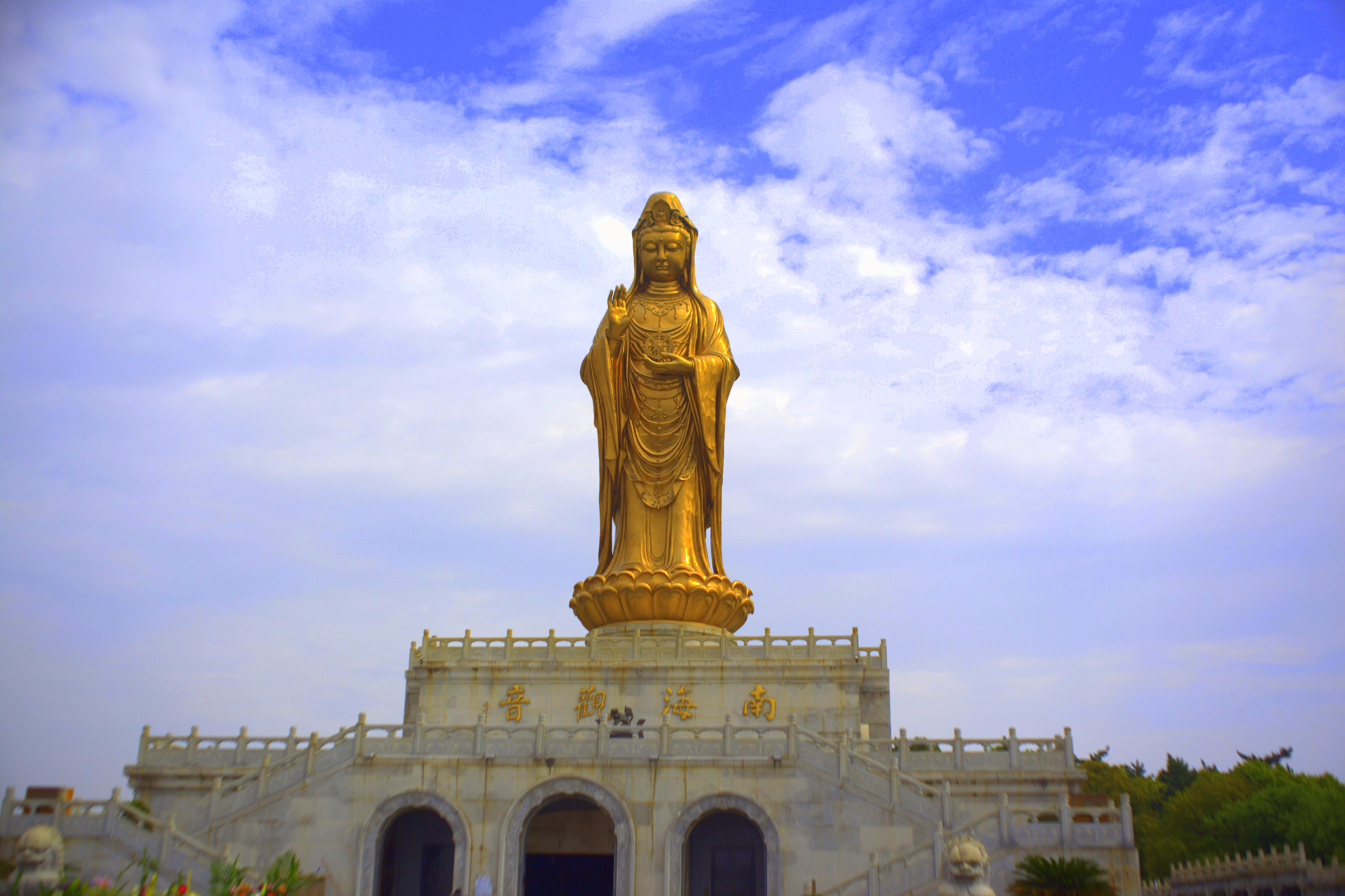
Mount Putuo Guanyin

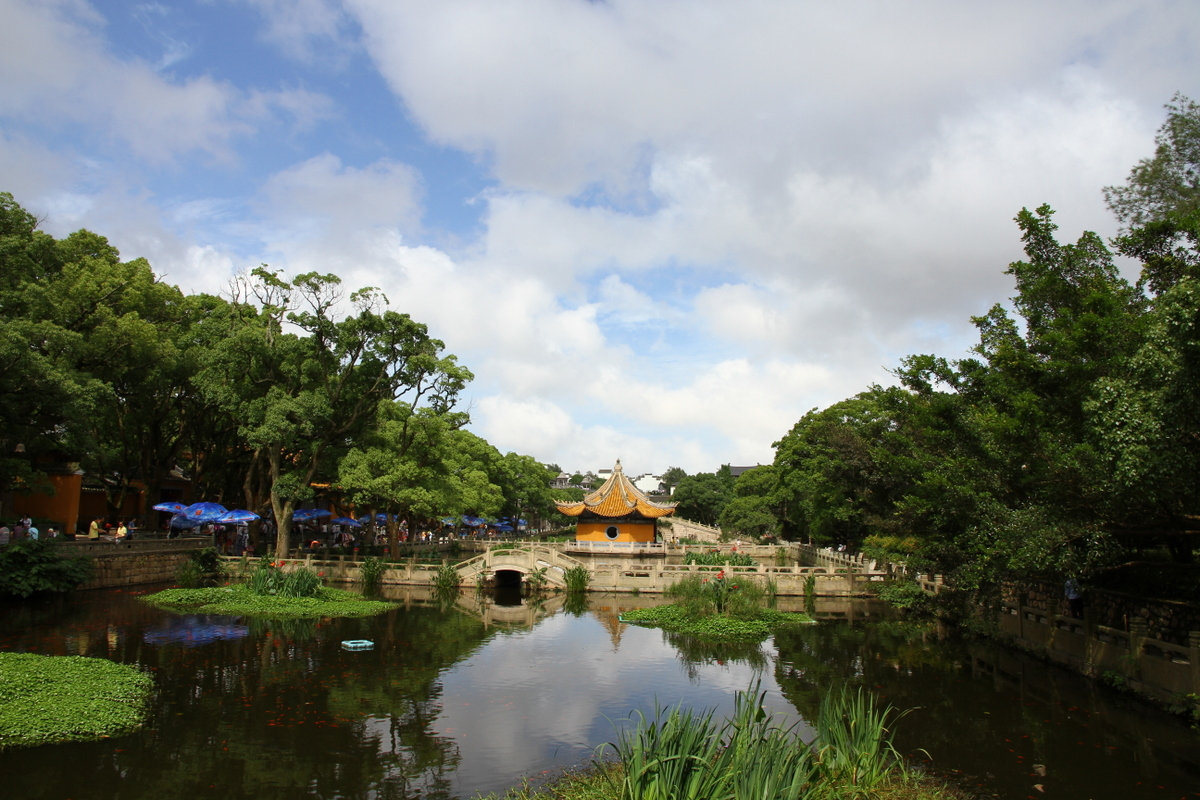
Putuo Shan lake and pavilions

Mount Putuo (Chinese: 普陀山; pinyin: Pǔtuó Shān, from Sanskrit: "Mount Potalaka") is an island in Putuo District, Zhoushan, Zhejiang, China. It is a renowned site in Chinese Buddhism and is the bodhimaṇḍa of the bodhisattva Guanyin.

Mount Putuo is one of the four sacred mountains in Chinese Buddhism, the others being Mount Wutai, Mount Jiuhua, and Mount Emei (bodhimaṇḍas for Manjushri, Kṣitigarbha, and Samantabhadra, respectively).

Mount Putuo lies in the East China Sea and incorporates the beauty of both mountain and sea. Mountain Putuo is at 29°58′3～30°02′3 north latitude, 122°21′6～122°24′9 east longitude. Its area is approximately 12.5 square kilometres (4.8 sq mi) and there are numerous famous temples. Every year on the 19th day of the 2nd, 6th and 9th lunar months of the Chinese calendar, it welcomes millions of people for the celebration of the birth of Guanyin.

== History ==
Mount Putuo has been a pilgrimage site for over a thousand years. After the Tang dynasty, Mount Putuo became a center of Guanyin worship. Traditionally there were three main temples: the Puji Temple (普濟寺, founded in the 10th century), the Fayu Temple (法雨寺, founded in 1580 CE), and the Huiji Temple (慧濟寺, founded 1793 CE). The site has received numerous renowned visitors over the ages, including the then 20-year-old future Chan master Yinyuan Longqi (Japanese: Ingen), who came to the site in 1612, while looking for his father, who had disappeared fifteen years earlier.

Taixu spent several years in solitary retreat at a small hermitage on Putuo.

== Temples ==
- Putuo is covered with many temples and monasteries, both large and small. All are under the directive of the Buddhist Association of China. Many monks and nuns from all over the country, and abroad, go to great lengths to live and practice there. Today, there are more than 30 major temples located at Mount Putuo, including the Puji, Fayu, and Huiji Temples.
- In addition to these monasteries, there is the Institute of Buddhism, one of the largest Buddhist academic institutes in China.
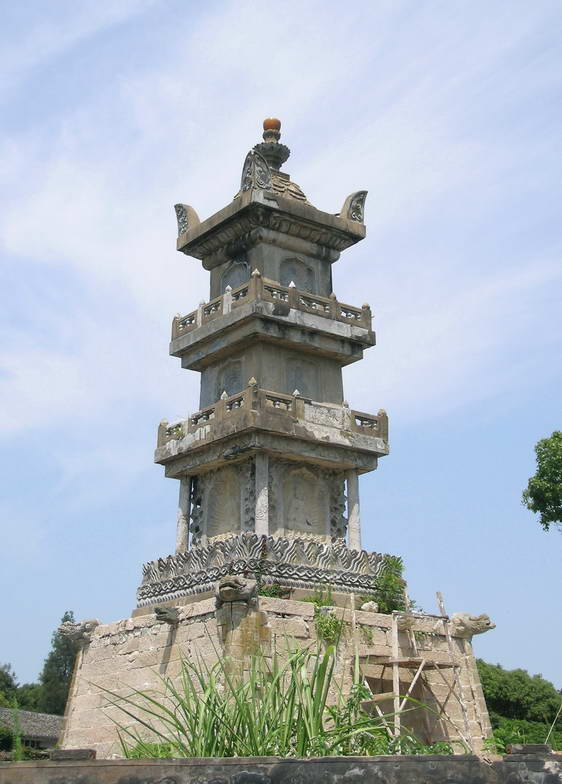
Duo Bao Pagoda

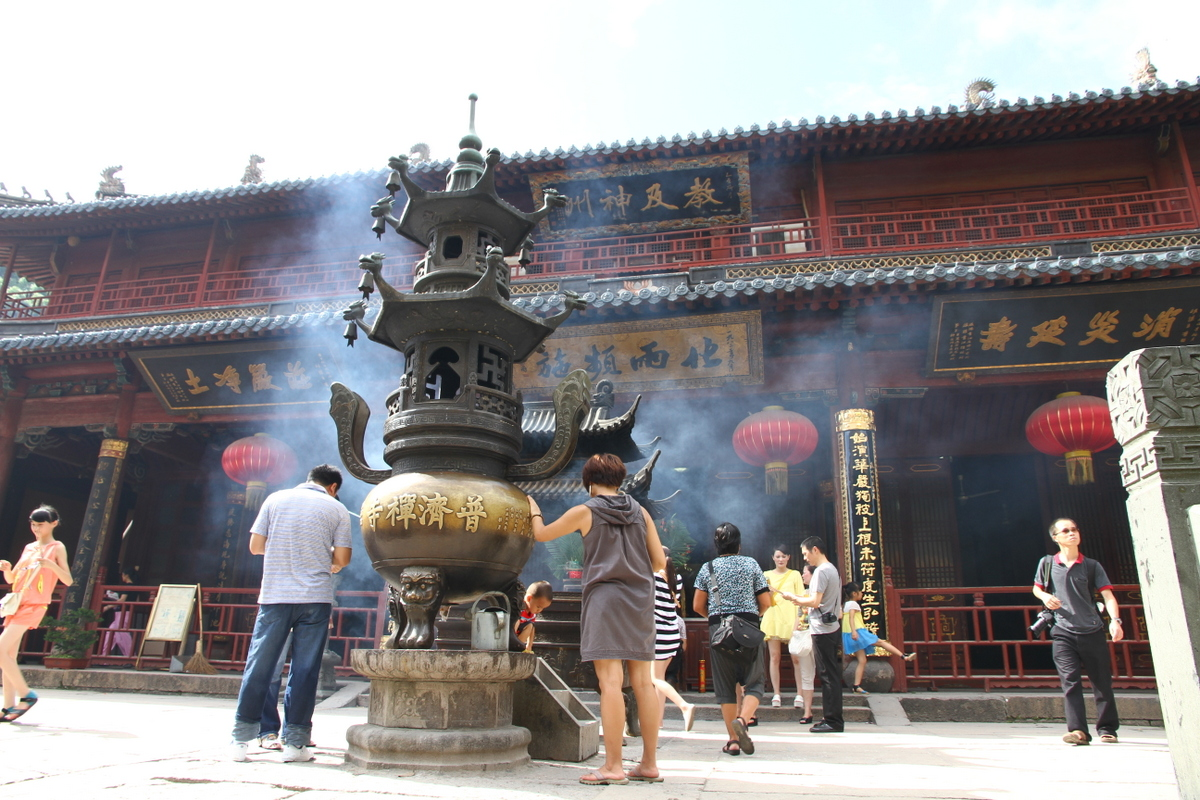
Puji Temple

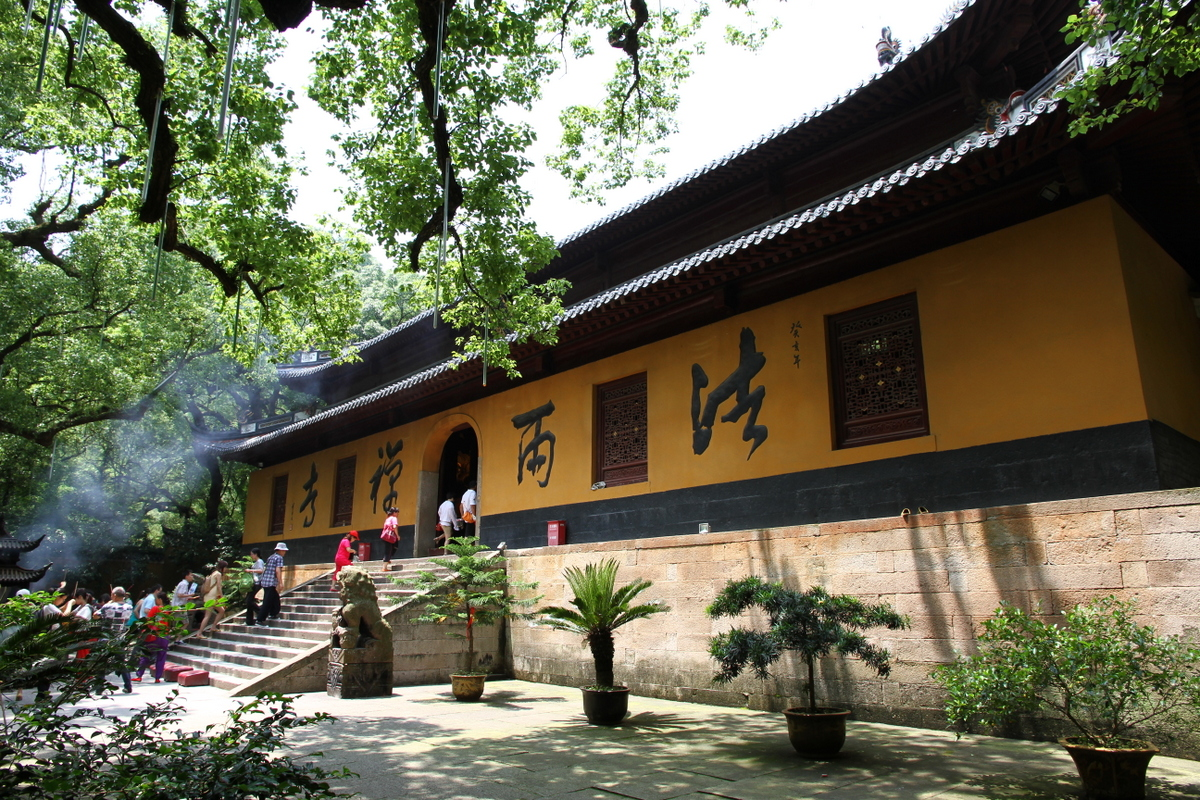
Fayu Temple

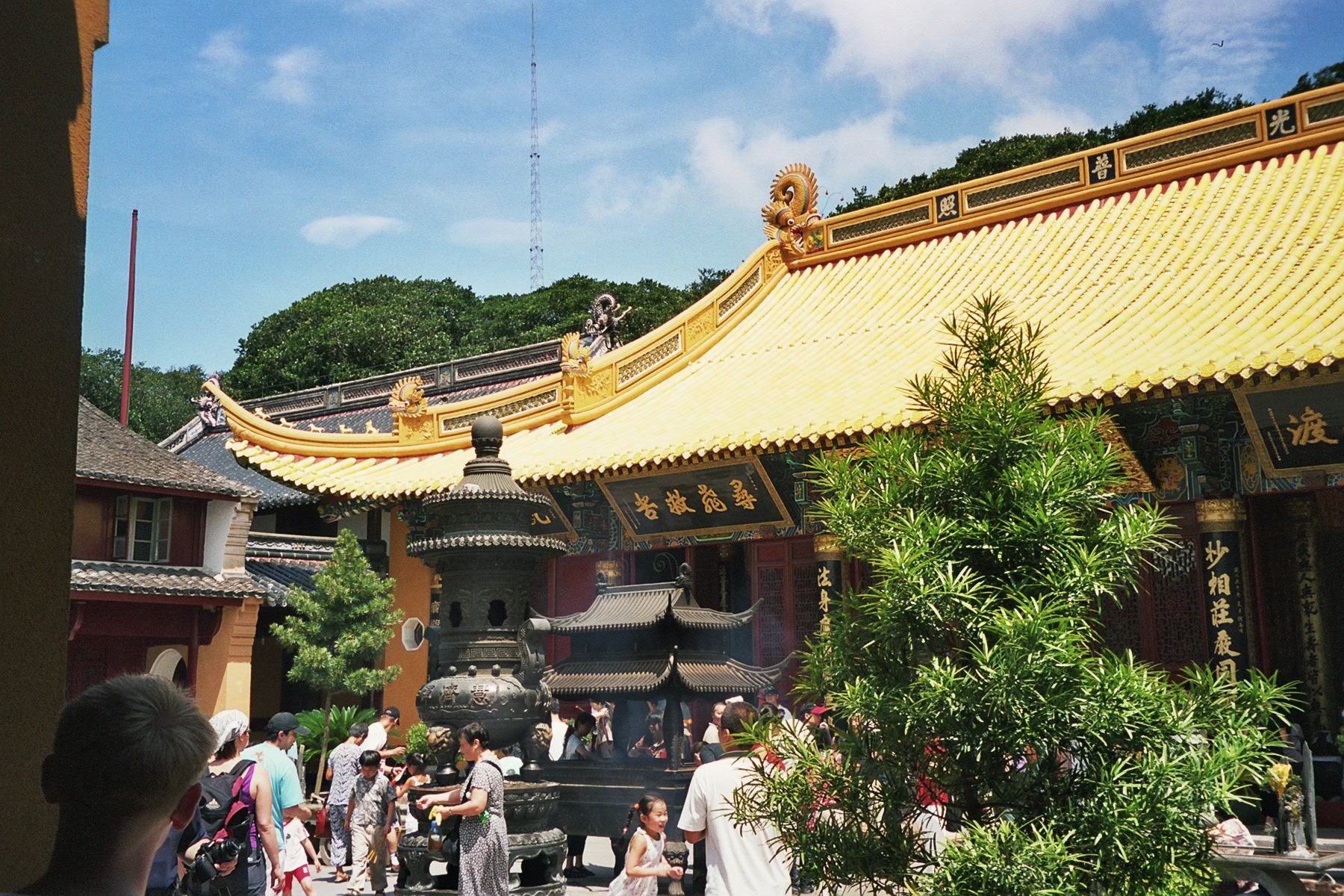
Huiji Temple

== Vegetation ==
There are 238 species of natural trees and shrubs on Mount Putuo, including 63 species of rare and precious ancient trees that are more than 100 years old, belonging to 37 families and 53 genera, with the largest number of eucalyptus trees.

The list of plants in Mount Putuo:

- Podocarpus macrophyllus, belongs to Podocarpaceae, evergreen tree. There are 78 strains of Podocarpus on Mount Putuo that are over 100 years old.
- Ginkgo biloba belongs to the family Ginkgoaceae. Ginkgo biloba grows slowly and has a very long life span of more than a thousand years. There are 10 large ginkgo trees on Mount Putuo.
- Liquidambar formosana belongs to Hamamelidaceae, deciduous tree. There are 67 trees of more than 100 years of maple trees on Mount Putuo.
- Celtis tetrandra belongs to Ulmaceae, deciduous trees. Mount Putuo has a wide natural distribution, and there are 282 ancient trees totally.
- Ilex integra belongs to Aquifoliaceae, evergreen trees. The crown is beautiful, resistant to wind, drought-resistant, and adaptable. There are scattered distributions throughout Mount Putuo. The largest one is after Guanyindong Mountain, and the age of the tree is about 400 years.

Rare plants include:

- Carpinus putoensis belongs to Betulaceae, only found in Mount Putuo. It is on the west side of Huiji Temple in Foding Mountain. The age of the tree is over 200 years and the height of the tree is about 12.5 meters. In 1999, it was listed as a national key protected wild plant, and the World Conservation Union (IUCN) listed as a critically endangered grade (CR).
- Neolitsea sericea belongs to Lauraceae evergreen tree. Its young leaves densely covered with silky, yellow-brown hairs which appear golden in the sunshine can be the characteristic of this tree. It is located under the hillside of Foding Mountain. Neolitsea sericea is currently listed as an endangered plant in China.

== Other features ==
- 33 m (108 ft) tall statue of the Guanyin at Zizhulin (紫竹林)
- Two major beaches: Hundred Step Beach and Thousand Step Beach. Hundred Step Beach charges for entry and has facilities such as deckchairs and parasols, and activities such as a banana boat and quad bikes.
- The only surviving specimen of Carpinus putoensis, a critically endangered species.

== Transport ==
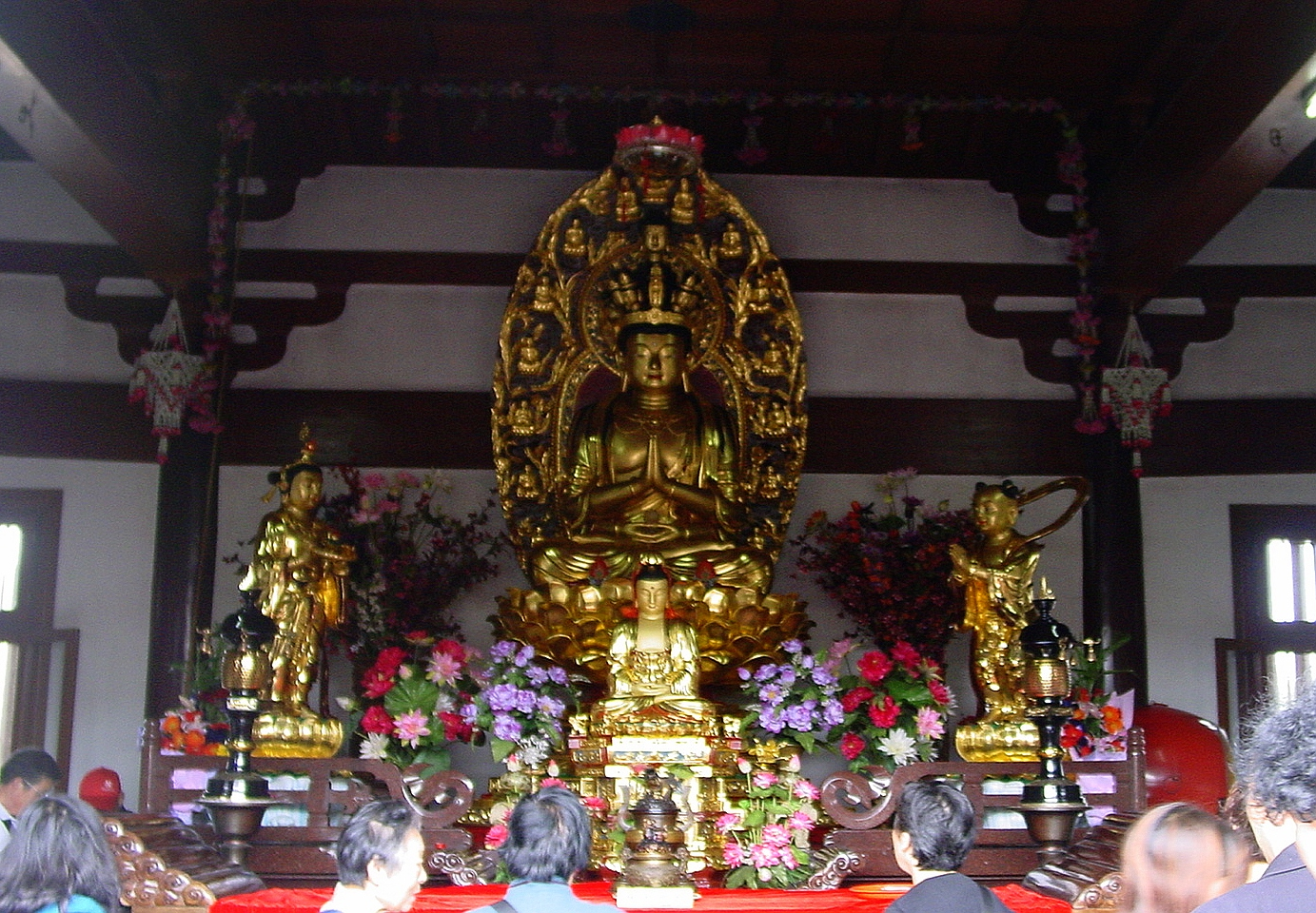
Statue of Ekādaśamukha or the Eleven-Headed Guanyin (Chinese: 十一面觀音; pinyin: Shíyīmiàn Guānyīn) in Bukenqu Guanyin Yard (不肯去觀音院), one of the numerous temples on Mount Putuo

Many of the Zhoushan Islands are now linked by bridges. This means that Putuoshan can easily be reached by bus from Shanghai and Ningbo. The bus terminates at Shenjiamen Bus Station. From the Banshengdong Wharf on the Shenjiamen waterfront it is a 10-minute ride by fast ferry (22 RMB) to Putuoshan. In Shanghai, the Nanpu Bridge Bus Station, Shanghai Stadium Sightseeing Bus Center and Shanghai South Long Distance Bus Station have several departures daily to Shenjiamen (4–5 hours, 138 RMB). In Ningbo, the North and South bus stations both have regular daily departures to Shenjiamen (2–3 hours, 60 RMB).

There are two flights daily from Shanghai Hongqiao International Airport to Putuo Airport, which is only 3 km (1.9 mi) from Shenjiamen (approx 800 RMB).

The ferry services mentioned below are still available but the bus services now provide a greater level of convenience and comfort. Putuoshan can be reached by boat from the major cities of Ningbo and Shanghai. It will take approximately an hour by boat to reach the wharf at Ningbo, from where a bus transports passengers to Ningbo city centre. There are two boats linking Putuoshan and Shanghai. One departs in the evening and travels overnight, arriving in the early morning; the other leaves early in the day from a wharf outside of Shanghai city centre but takes less than two hours.

The transportation system of Mount Putuo is very special. Private cars are not allowed there, and people can only rely on public transport. The reason for this rule is because the area of Putuo Mountain is very small, and only one road runs through the entire island. It is therefore necessary to control the number of cars on the island to avoid traffic congestion. At the same time, excessive vehicle emissions will affect the environment and air quality of Mount Putuo. In addition, Mount Putuo is mountainous, so buses are not flexible enough for people to travel in. And as there are thousands of tourists coming to Mount Putuo and the number of buses is far from enough, the cable car has become another important means of transportation.

== Weather ==
It is an Asian warm-temperate moist climate (Cfa) and has four distinct seasons. It has plenty of rain and fog. The average temperature of whole year is 16.1 °C (61 °F). The coldest month is January, average temperature is 5.4 °C (42 °F). The hottest month is August, temperature is 27.0 °C (81 °F). It has typhoon season on July, August and September. The average speed of wind is 4.2 to 5.7 metres per second (15 to 21 km/h).

The Mount Putuo has all-year-round travel seasons, but in regard to when and where to get on the island, tourists should be careful and check the weather forecast beforehand.

== Miscellaneous ==
In 2013 the Chinese religious film Avalokitesvara tells the origin of Mount Putuo as the bodhimanda of Guanyin Bodhisattva. The film was filmed onsite at Mount Putuo. It was also selected as one of the World Great films during the 37th Montreal World Film Festival.
