= Baiyun Temple =

Baiyun Temple may refer to:

== China ==
- White Cloud Temple, Taoist temple in Beijing
- Baiyun Temple (Mount Wutai), Buddhist temple on Mount Wutai, in Shanxi
- Baiyun Temple (Ningxiang), Buddhist temple in Ningxiang, Hunan
- Baiyun Temple (Huixian), in Huixian, Xinxiang, Henan
- Baiyun Temple, an early name for Bishan Temple in Taihuai, Wutai, Xinzhou, Shanxi

== See also ==
- Baiyun (disambiguation)
