= Jiangfang =

Jiangfang, may refer to:

- Jiangfang Township, Wutai County, a rural township in Wutai County, Shanxi, China.
- Jiangfang Township, Chengbu County, a rural township in Chengbu Miao Autonomous County, Hunan, China.
