= Baiyun =

Baiyun (generally simplified Chinese: 白云; traditional Chinese: 白雲, meaning "white cloud") may refer to:

== Name ==
- Bai Yun (politician) (born 1960), Chinese politician.
- Bai Yun (giant panda), giant panda

== Place ==
=== Guangzhou ===
- Baiyun District, Guangzhou
- Baiyun Mountain (Guangdong)
- Baiyun New Town
- Guangzhou Baiyun International Airport, in Huadu District
- Guangzhou Baiyun International Airport (former), closed down in 2004
- Guangzhou Baiyun railway station, serving Baiyun District
- Baiyun Subdistrict, Guangzhou, subdivision of Yuexiu District

=== Subdistricts ===
- Baiyun Subdistrict, Dalian, subdivision of Xigang District, Dalian, Liaoning
- Baiyun Subdistrict, Shangqiu, subdivision of Liangyuan District, Shangqiu, Henan
- Baiyun Subdistrict, Dongyang, subdivision of Dongyang, Zhejiang
- Baiyun Subdistrict, Lishui, subdivision of Liandu District, Lishui, Zhejiang
- Baiyun Subdistrict, Ningbo, subdivision of Haishu District, Ningbo, Zhejiang
- Baiyun Subdistrict, Quzhou, subdivision of Kecheng District, Quzhou, Zhejiang
- Baiyun Subdistrict, Taizhou, Zhejiang, subdivision of Jiaojiang District, Taizhou, Zhejiang

=== Towns ===
- Baiyun, Anshun, town in Pingba District, Anshun, Guizhou
- Baiyun, Zitong County, town in Zitong County, Sichuan

=== Townships ===
- Baiyun Township, Chongqing, subdivision of Wulong District, Chongqing
- Baiyun Township, Fujian, subdivision of Yongtai County, Fujian
- Baiyun Township, Guangxi, subdivision of Rongshui Miao Autonomous County, Guangxi
- Baiyun Township, Guizhou, subdivision of Chishui City, Guizhou
- Baiyun Township, Hebei, subdivision of Shunping County, Hebei
- Baiyun Township, Heilongjiang, subdivision of Nenjiang County, Heilongjiang
- Baiyun Township, Hunan, subdivision of Shimen County, Hunan
- Baiyun Township, Sichuan, subdivision of Pujiang County, Sichuan
- Baiyun Township, Yunnan, subdivision of Pingbian Miao Autonomous County, Yunnan

=== Other places ===
- Baiyun District, Guiyang, Guizhou
- Bayan Obo Mining District, Baotou, Inner Mongolia
- Baiyun Peak, a mountain in Zhejiang
- Baiyun Dam, in Hunan
- Baiyun Temple (disambiguation), several places
