= Dongye =

Dongye may refer to:

- Eastern Ye, chiefdom in northeastern Korean peninsula from roughly 3rd-century BC to around early 5th-century AD

== Towns in China ==
- Dongye, Wutai County, Shanxi
- Dongye, Yangcheng County, Shanxi
- Dongye, Xinjiang, in Shawan County, Xinjiang
