= Biyun Temple =

Biyun Temple may refer to:

- Temple of Azure Clouds, or Biyun Temple, Buddhist temple in Beijing, China
- Biyun Chan Temple, temple in Changhua County, Taiwan

== See also ==
- Baiyun Temple (disambiguation)
