= Baiyun Temple (Mount Wutai) =

Buddhist temple in Shanxi, China

- 白云寺
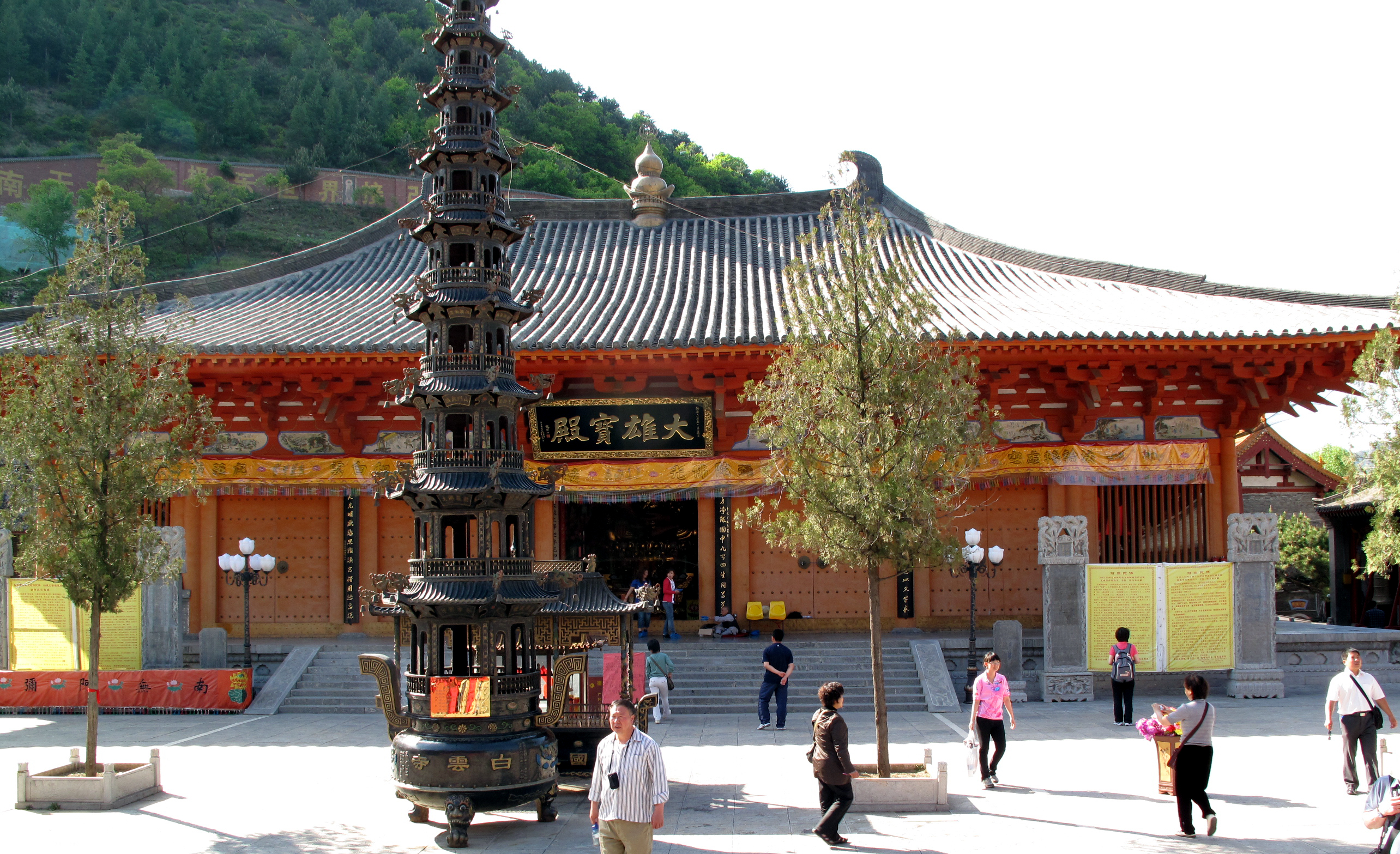
- The Mahavira Hall at Baiyun Temple.

- Location within Shanxi Location within China

Religion
- Affiliation: Buddhism
- Sect: Pure Land Buddhism
- Prefecture: Wutai County
- Province: Shanxi

Location
- Country: China
- Interactive map of Baiyun Temple
- Prefecture: Wutai County
- Coordinates: 38°56′51″N 113°35′34″E

Architecture
- Style: Chinese architecture
- Established: Tang dynasty (618-907)

The Baiyun Temple (simplified Chinese: 白云寺; traditional Chinese: 白雲寺; pinyin: Baíyún Sì) is a Buddhist temple located in Taihuai Town of Wutai County, Xinzhou, Shanxi, China. Baiyun Temple was originally built in the Tang dynasty (618–907), but because of war and natural disasters and wars has been rebuilt numerous times since then. The present version was completed in 2005.

== History ==
Baiyun Temple was first established in the Tang dynasty (618–907) by a Buddhism believer from Taiyuan, Shanxi. According to the earliest literature records, "Jinding Temple in Mount Jiuhua in the southern China, and Baiyun Temple in Mount Wutai in northern China".

In the Song dynasty (960–1279), Chan master Daofeng (道风禅师) served as abbot of Baiyun Temple, Bishan Temple, Jindeng Temple, and Lianjin Temple. The temple had reached unprecedented heyday in that time.

In the reign of the Kangxi Emperor (1654–1722), he worshiped Baiyun Temple and wrote a poem Baiyun Temple. Later in 1748, in the reign of the Qianlong Emperor (1711–1799), a fire devastated two thirds of its buildings.

In the Second Sino-Japanese War and Cultural Revolution, Baiyun Temple was completely destroyed by the invaders and mobs.

In 1995, master Changlong (昌隆法师) rebuilt Baiyun Temple. The Lotus Throne of Guanyin, Hall of Four Heavenly Kings, Mahavira Hall, Jieyin Hall, Bell tower, Drum tower, Hall of Kshitigarbha, Hall of Bhaisajyaguru, Hall of Guru, and Wuguan Hall were restored from 1995 to 2005.

== Gallery ==
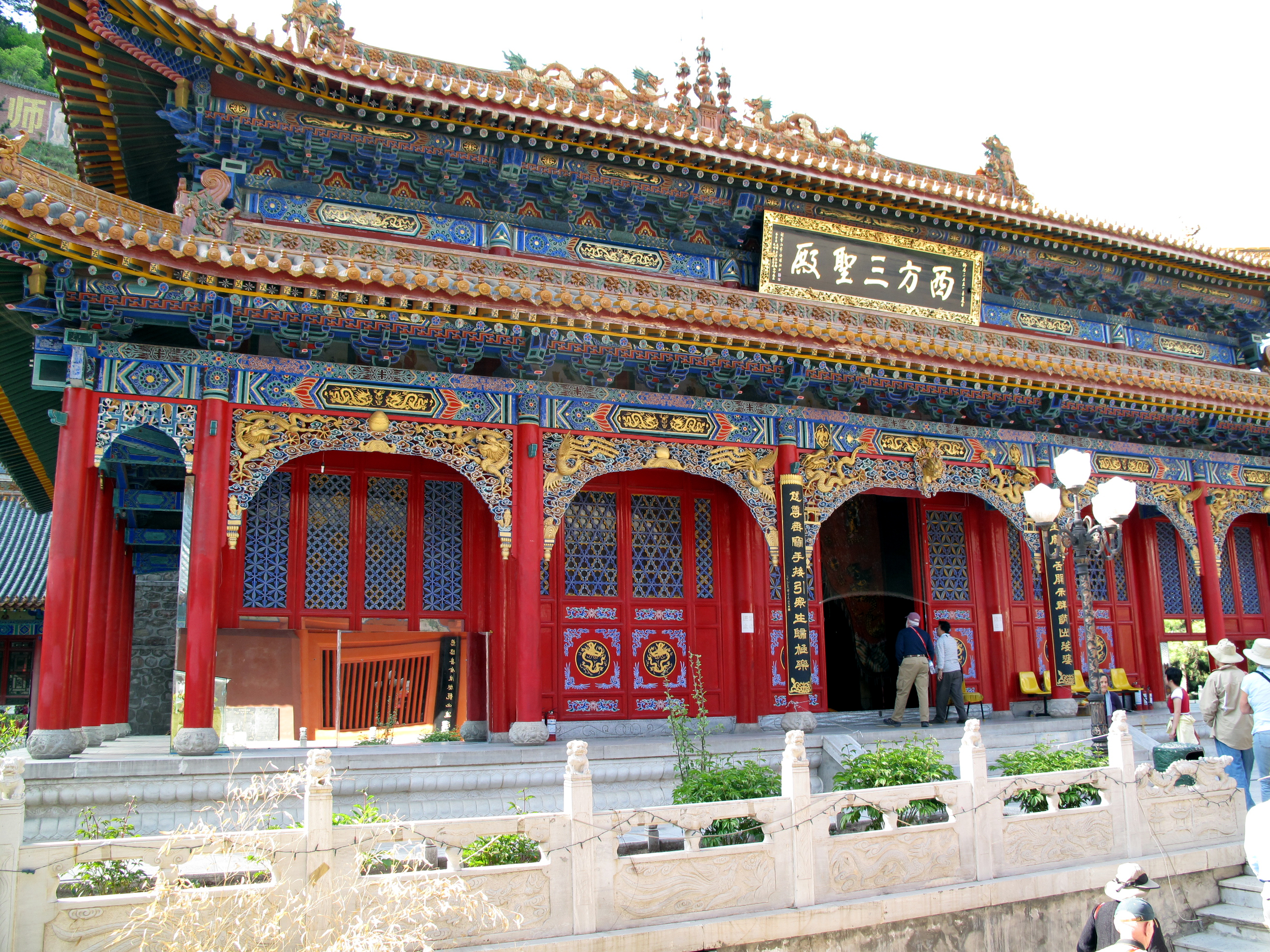
Hall of Three Sages.

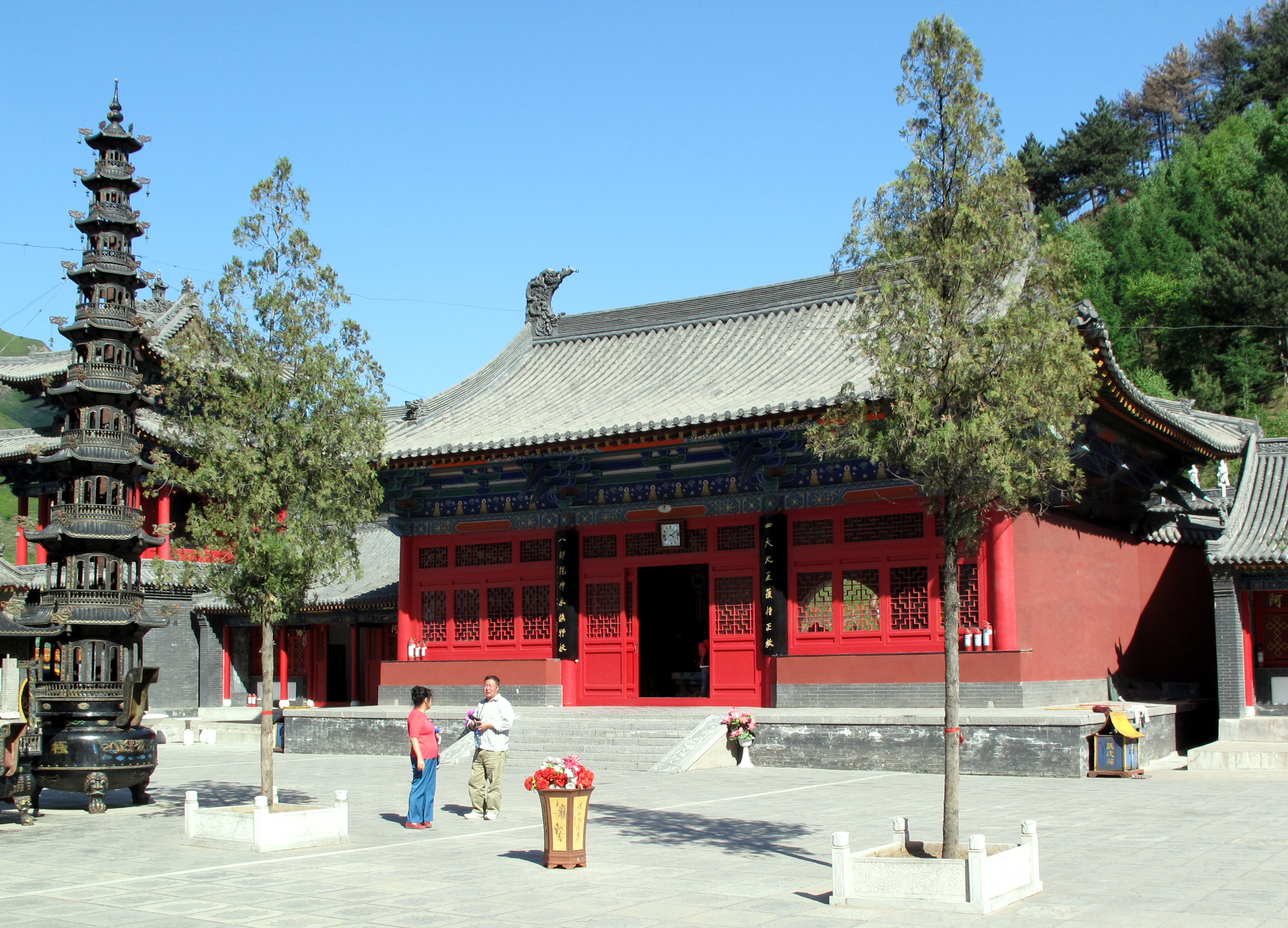
A hall at Baiyun Temple.

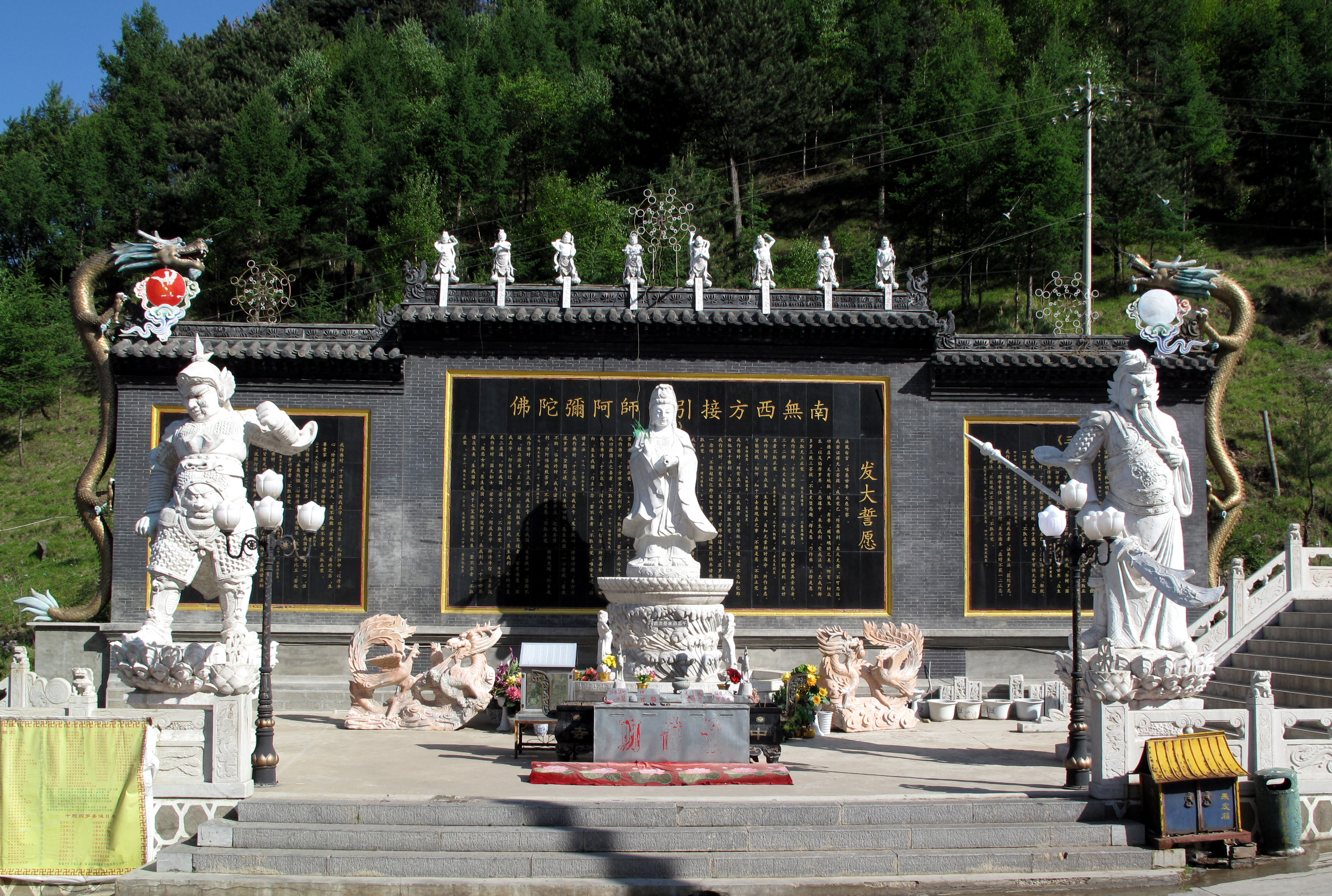
A stone wall at Baiyun Temple.
