= Yanqing Temple =

Buddhist temple in Xinzhou, China

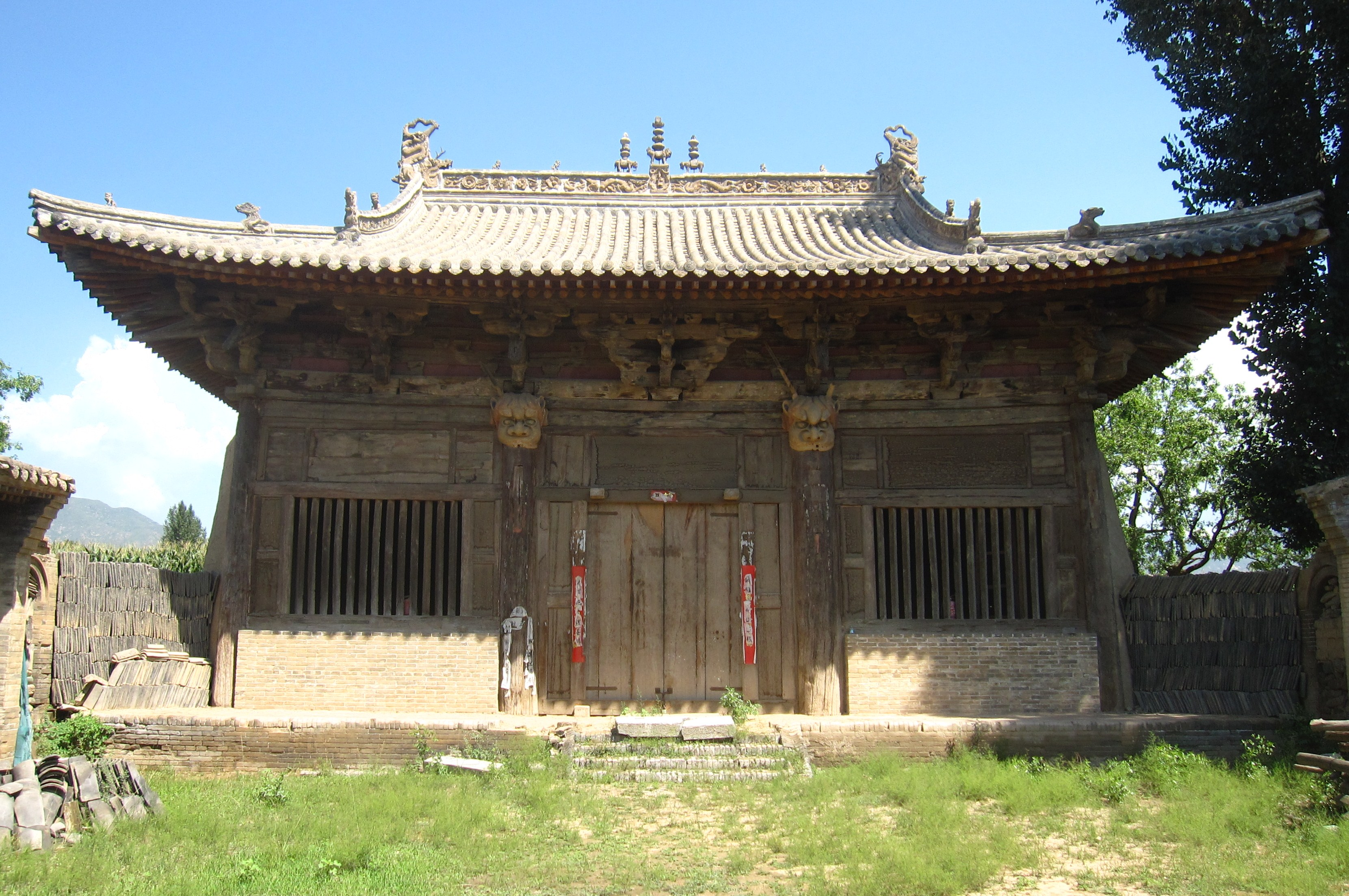
- The Main Hall of Yanqing Temple

Religion
- Affiliation: Buddhist
- Province: Shanxi

Location
- Location: Wutai County
- Interactive map of Yanqing Temple
- Coordinates: 38.75°N 113.0652°E

Architecture
- Completed: Jin dynasty (1115–1234)

Yanqing Temple (simplified Chinese: 延庆寺; traditional Chinese: 延慶寺; pinyin: Yánqìng Sì) is a Buddhist temple located 25 kilometers (16 mi) to the west of Wutai County, Shanxi, China.

== History ==
The Yanqing temple was founded during the Jin dynasty, and its Great Hall also dates from that period. The Great Hall contains three bays, six rafters, and is 13 square meters (140 sq ft). The interior of the Great Hall has no pillars; it supports itself using the brackets of two rafters.
