= Foguang Temple =

Buddhist temple in Doucun, Shanxi, China

- 佛光寺
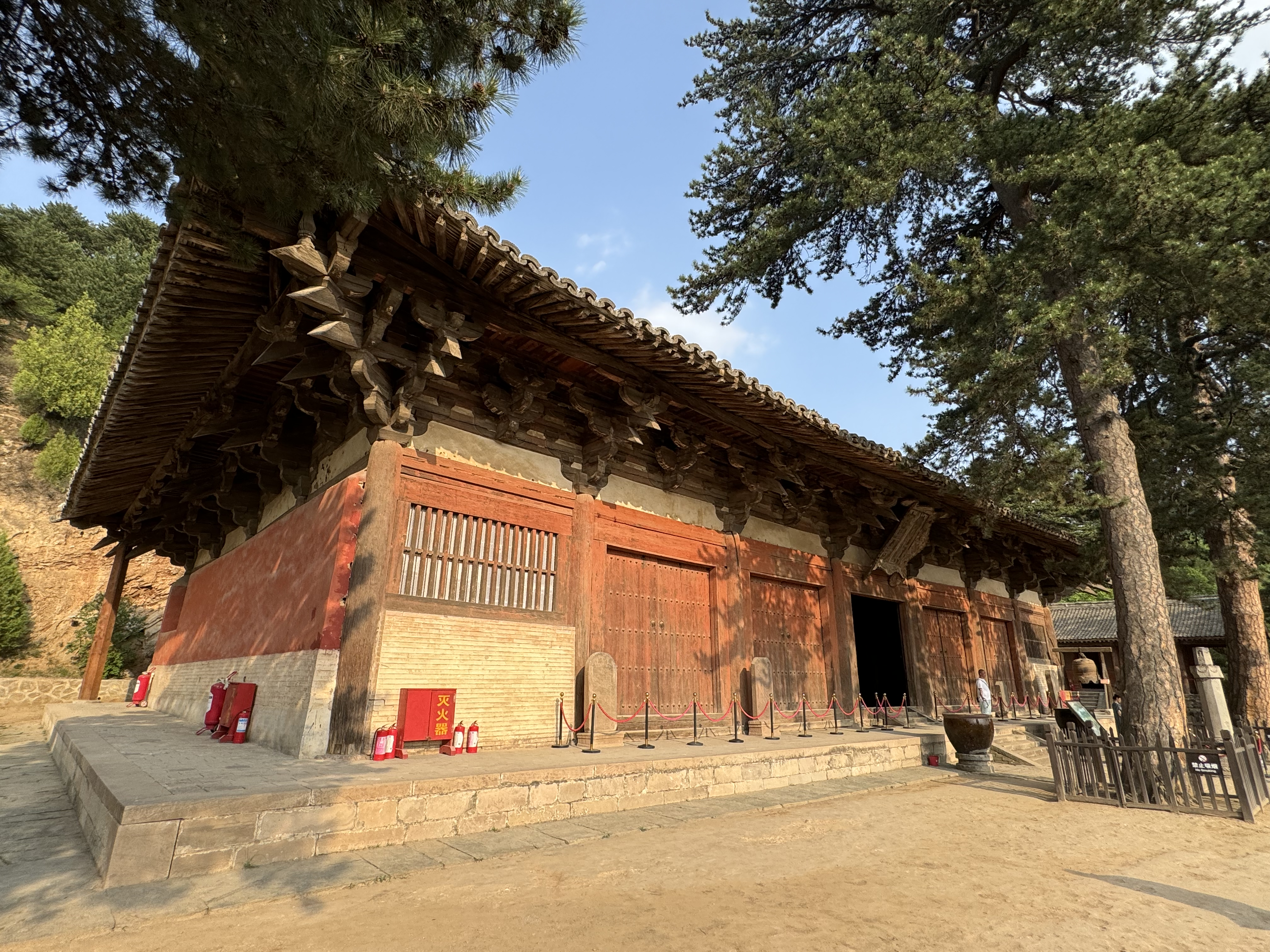
- The Dongda Hall of the Foguang Temple

- Location within Shanxi Location within China

Religion
- Affiliation: Buddhism
- Deity: Śākyamuni, Amitābha, Maitreya, Mañjuśrī, Samantabhadra

Location
- Location: Foguang Village, Doucun Township, Wutai County, Xinzhou, Shanxi Province
- Country: China
- Coordinates: 38°52′09″N 113°23′16″E

Architecture
- Completed: 857 CE; Tang dynasty

Foguang Temple
- "Foguang Temple" in Chinese characters
- Chinese: 佛光真容禪寺、佛光寺
- Literal meaning: "Temple of Buddha's Light"
Transcriptions
Standard Mandarin
- Hanyu Pinyin: Fóguāng sì
- IPA: [fwǒ.kwáŋ sɹ̩̂]
Wu
- Suzhounese: Veq^{8}-kuaon^{1} zy^{6}
Yue: Cantonese
- Yale Romanization: Faht-gwōng jih
- Jyutping: Fat6-gwong1 zi6
- IPA: [fɐt̚˨.kʷɔŋ˥ tsi˨]
Southern Min
- Tâi-lô: Pu̍t-kng sī (col.); Hu̍t-kong sī (lit.)

Foguang Temple (Chinese: 佛光寺; lit. "Temple of Buddha's Light") is a Buddhist temple located five kilometres from Doucun Town, Wutai County, Shanxi Province of China. The temple complex covers approximately 8.4 acres and contains over 120 structures dating from the Northern Wei dynasty to the Qing dynasty. The temple is inscribed as part of the Mount Wutai UNESCO World Heritage Site.

The major hall of the temple is the Dongda Hall, built in 857 AD, during the Tang dynasty (618–907). It is the third earliest preserved timber structure in China. The Dongda Hall is the only building to contain Tang-dynasty architecture, sculpture, mural painting, and calligraphic inscriptions in a single structure, known as the "Four Supremacies", and the temple is regarded as China's foremost national treasure of ancient architecture.

The temple was rediscovered by architectural historians Liang Sicheng and Lin Huiyin in 1937, while an older smaller hall at Nanchan Temple was discovered by the same team a year later. The temple also contains another significant hall dating from 1137 called the Wenshu Hall. The temple grounds also contain one of only two surviving Northern Wei pagodas in China.

== History ==
The temple was established in the fifth century during the Northern Wei dynasty of the Northern dynasties era. From the years of 785 to 820, the temple underwent an active building period when a three level, 32 m tall pavilion was built. In 845, Emperor Wuzong banned Buddhism in China. As part of the persecution, Foguang temple was burned to the ground, with only the Zushi pagoda surviving from the temple's early history. Twelve years later in 857 the temple was rebuilt, with the Dongda Hall being built on the former site of a three-storey pavilion. A woman named Ning Gongyu provided most of the funds needed to construct the hall, and its construction was led by a monk named Yuancheng. In the 10th century, a depiction of Foguang Temple was painted in cave 61 of the Mogao Grottoes. However, it is likely the painters had never seen the temple, because the main hall in the painting is a two-storied white building with a green-glaze roof, very different from the red and white of the Dongda Hall. This painting indicates that Foguang Temple was an important stop for Buddhist pilgrims. In 1137 of the Jin dynasty, the Wenshu Hall, dedicated to the Bodhisattva Wenshu (Manjusri) was constructed on the temple's north side, along with another hall dedicated to the Bodhisattva Puxian (Samantabhadra), which was burnt down in the Qing dynasty (1644–1912).

== Rediscovery ==
=== Background ===
In the early twentieth century, Japanese architectural historians, notably Sekino Tadashi, surveyed historic buildings across China and concluded that no timber-framed structures from the Tang dynasty (618–907) survived on Chinese soil; to see authentic Tang-era wooden architecture, one would have to visit Nara, Japan. This claim became a direct impetus for the work of the Society for Research in Chinese Architecture, founded in Beiping in 1930. Among its leading members were the architect Liang Sicheng and his wife, the architect and poet Lin Huiyin. From 1932 to 1937, Liang and his colleagues conducted fieldwork across northern China, surveying hundreds of ancient structures, but no definitively Tang-dynasty timber building had been identified.

=== The Dunhuang clue ===
The critical lead came from a photograph. While studying images taken by the French sinologist Paul Pelliot at the Mogao Caves in Dunhuang, Liang noticed a monumental mural on the west wall of Cave 61. Known as the "Map of Mount Wutai", the painting, approximately 13.4 meters wide, depicted the entire Mount Wutai landscape in extraordinary detail, identifying dozens of monasteries by name. Prominently labelled was "The Great Foguang Temple".

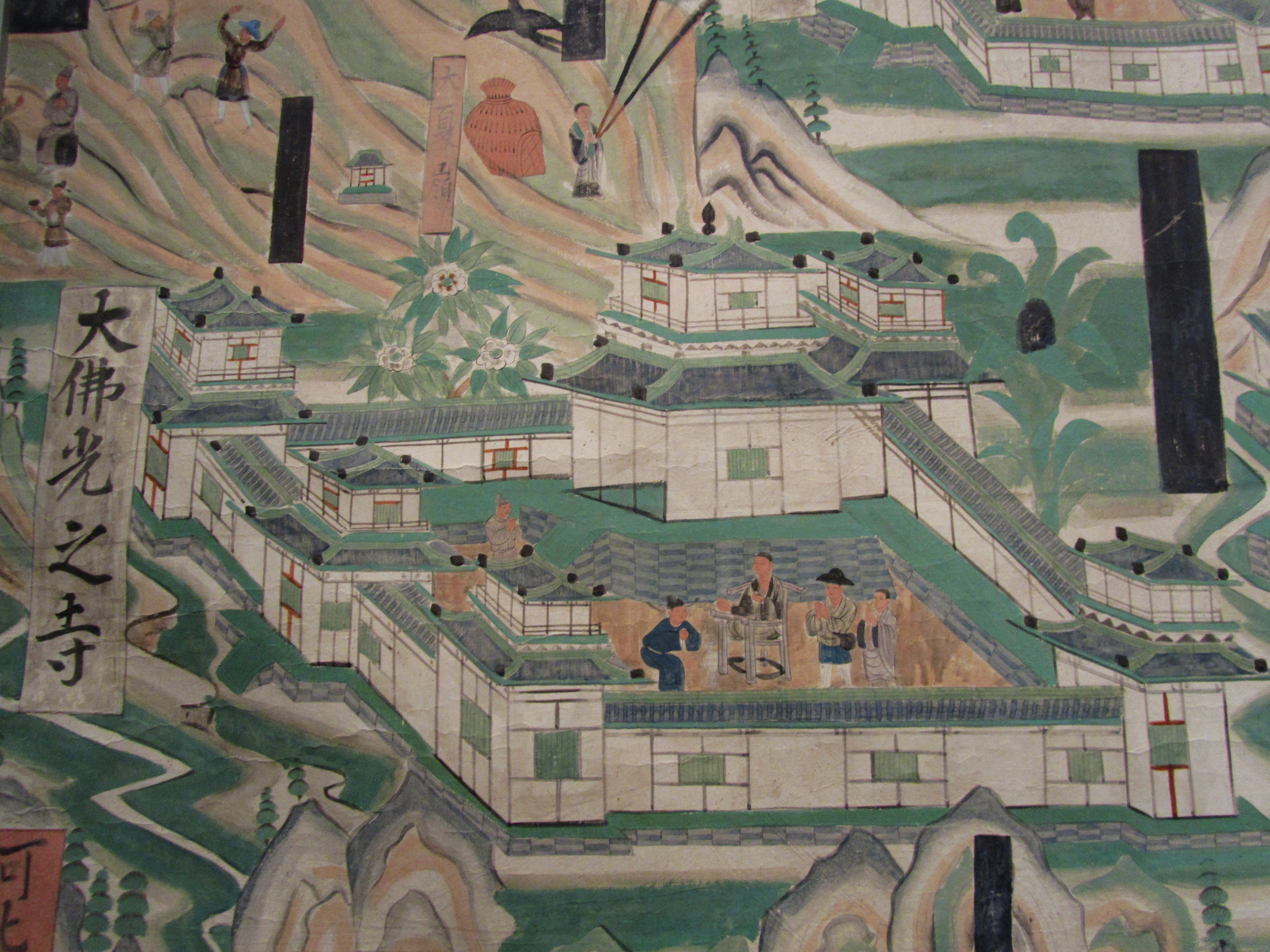
Mogao Cave 61 mural of Foguang Temple grounds, from around late Tang dynasty or Five Dynasties period.

The mural dated to the Five Dynasties period (tenth century) but depicted late-Tang conditions. Liang cross-referenced this with Chinese historical sources recording that Foguang Temple had been destroyed during Emperor Wuzong's suppression of Buddhism in 845, then rebuilt in 857. He reasoned that if the main hall dated to 857 and the site had since fallen into obscurity, the Tang-dynasty structure might still survive.

=== The 1937 expedition ===
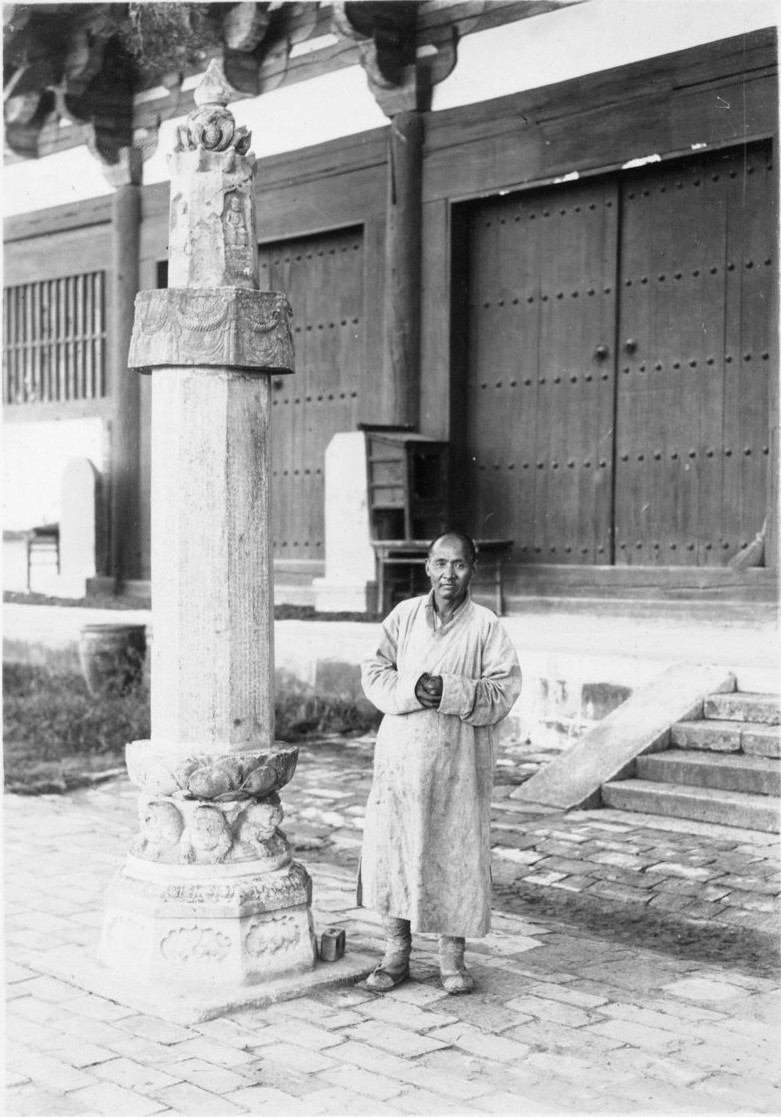
A monk at Foguang temple, early 20th century.

In late June 1937, a team of four, Liang Sicheng, Lin Huiyin, Mo Zongjiang, and Ji Yutang, departed from Wutai county seat and headed northeast toward Doucun by mule. In his account, Liang described the journey as winding along precipitous cliff-edge paths through secluded and beautiful mountain scenery. At dusk, the team arrived at a temple nestled against a hillside about five kilometres from Doucun, facing west toward an open valley with mountains on three sides. This was Foguang Temple.

Liang later recalled that upon entering the Dongda Hall, spanning seven bays and appearing even more magnificent in the dim light, the team was overcome with astonishment and joy, their long-held conviction that Tang-era timber buildings must survive in China had at last found tangible proof. The hall's structural features, massive bracket sets, the proportions of its columns, and its floor plan, were consistent with Tang-dynasty construction, but visual assessment alone could not establish a precise date. Chinese builders traditionally recorded construction dates in ink on the ridge purlin; however, when the team climbed into the roof structure, they found no such inscription there.

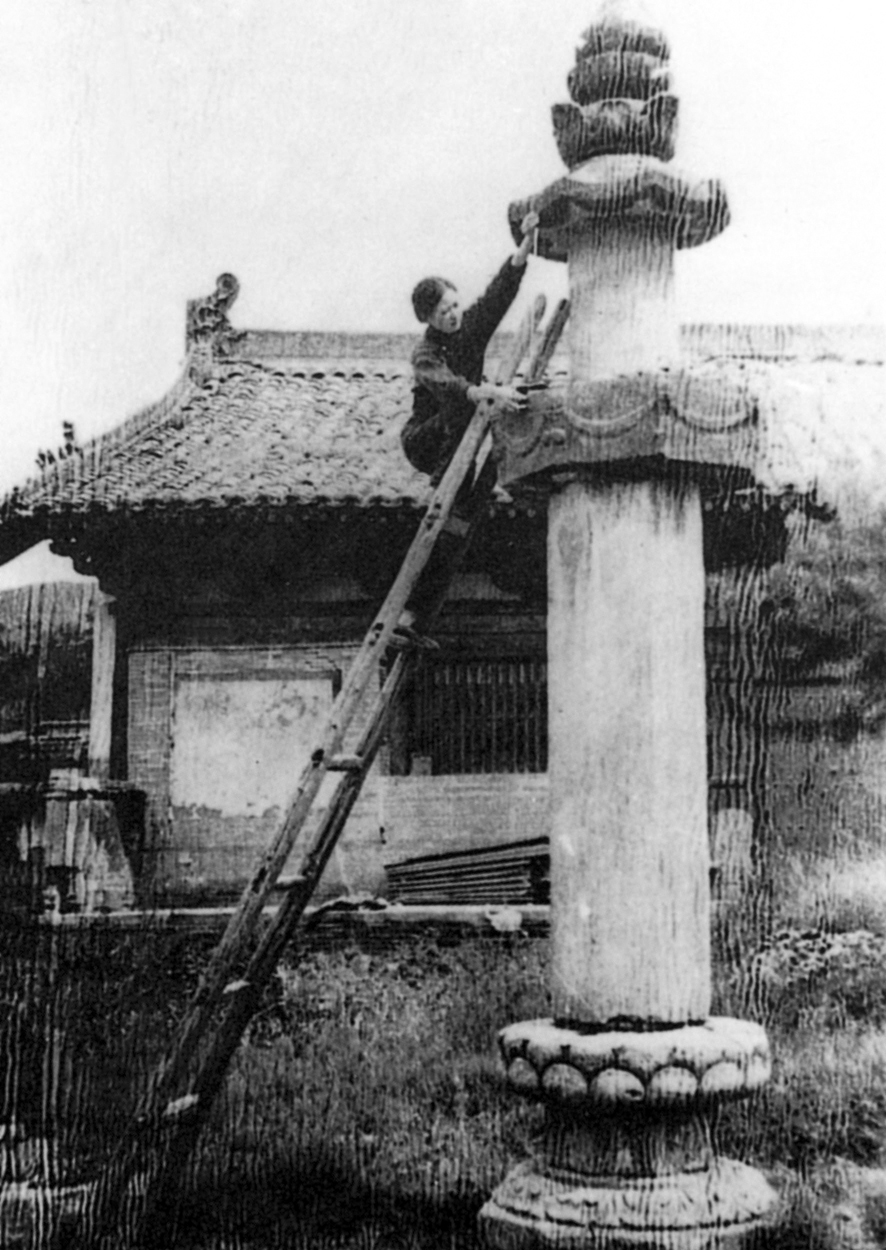
Lin Huiyin conducting an architectural survey of the stone pillar at Foguang Temple at the time of its rediscovery, 1937.

The breakthrough came on July 5, 1937. Working in the dim upper reaches of the hall, the team discovered faint ink writing on the underside of a large structural beam. Among the partially obscured characters, they deciphered: "Donor of the Buddha Hall: the female lay disciple Ning Gongyu, who made offerings from the capital".

Lin then examined a stone dharani pillar standing in the courtyard. On it she found the same name, Ning Gongyu, identified as the hall's donor, together with the date, the eleventh year of the Dazhong era, corresponding to 857 CE. The beam inscription and the pillar inscription corroborated each other, establishing the hall's construction in 857 during the Tang dynasty.

Liang wrote of the Dongda Hall that it was not merely the sole Tang-dynasty timber-framed hall discovered in the society's years of fieldwork, but the foremost treasure among China's ancient buildings, uniquely preserving four categories of Tang-era relics in a single structure, architecture, polychrome sculpture, mural painting, and calligraphic inscription, which he termed the "Four Supremacies".

Among the 35 Tang-dynasty clay sculptures on the altar platform are two portrait statues of historical figures: the hall's patron Ning and the monk Yuancheng. These are among the earliest surviving realistic portrait sculptures in Chinese Buddhist art.

The team completed their survey in early July 1937. Days later, on July 7, the Marco Polo Bridge Incident marked the beginning of the Second Sino-Japanese War. Liang's findings were published in the *Bulletin of the Society for Research in Chinese Architecture.

== Architecture ==
Plan of the temple

The temple is situated on the western slope of Foguang Mountain, on the southern flank of Mount Wutai, approximately 50 kilometres from the main temple cluster at Taihuai Town. The site occupies a hillside enclosed by mountains on its east, south, and north sides, with only the west side opening onto a broad valley of farmland and distant ranges. This topography dictated the temple's unusual east–west orientation, unlike most Chinese temples, which face south, Foguang Temple faces west, with its principal hall built against the eastern hillside at the highest point of the complex.

The temple's buildings are arranged on three terraced platforms ascending the slope from west to east. The lowest and broadest terrace contains the Jin dynasty Wenshu Hall; the middle terrace holds subsidiary courtyards; and the highest terrace, raised approximately 13 metres above the courtyard on a massive stone retaining wall reached by a stairway, supports the Tang-dynasty East Great Hall, which commands a panoramic westward view across the valley. Another large hall, known as the Puxian Hall, once existed on the south side of the monastery but is no longer extant.

=== Dongda Hall ===
Dating from 857 of the Tang dynasty, the Dongda Hall (东大殿), meaning "Great East Hall", is the third oldest dated wooden building in China after the main hall of the Nanchan Temple dated to 782, and the main hall of the Five Dragons Temple, dated to 831,

and the largest of the three. The hall is located on the far east side of the temple, atop a large stone platform. It is a single storey structure measuring seven bays by four or 34 by 17.7 metres (110 by 58 ft), and is supported by inner and outer sets of columns. On top of each column is a complicated set of brackets containing seven different bracket types that are one-second as high as the column itself. Supporting the roof of the hall, each of the bracket sets are connected by crescent shaped crossbeams, which create an inner ring above the inner set of columns and an outer ring above the outer columns. The hall has a lattice ceiling that conceals much of the roof frame from view. The hipped-roof and the extremely complex bracket sets are testament to the Dongda Hall's importance as a structure during the Tang dynasty. According to the 11th-century architectural treatise, Yingzao Fashi, the Dongda Hall closely corresponds to a seventh rank building in a system of eight ranks. The high rank of the Dongda Hall indicates that even in the Tang dynasty it was an important building. No other building from the period with such a high rank has survived.

Inside the hall are thirty-six sculptures, as well as murals on each wall that date from the Tang dynasty and later periods. The center of the hall has a platform with three large statues of Shijiamounifo (Sakyamuni), Amituofo (Amitabha) and Mi Le Fo (Maitreya) sitting on lotus shaped seats. Each of the three statues is flanked by four assistants on the side and two bodhisattvas in front. Next to the platform, there are statues of Wenshu (Manjusri) riding a lion as well as Puxian (Samantabhadra) on an elephant. Two heavenly kings stand on either side of the dais. A statue representing the hall's benefactor, Ning Gongwu and one of the monk who helped build the hall Yuancheng, are present in the back of the hall. There is one large mural in the hall that shows events that took place in the Jataka, which chronicles Buddha's past life. Smaller murals in the temple show Manjusri and Samantabhadra gathering donors to help support the upkeep of the temple.

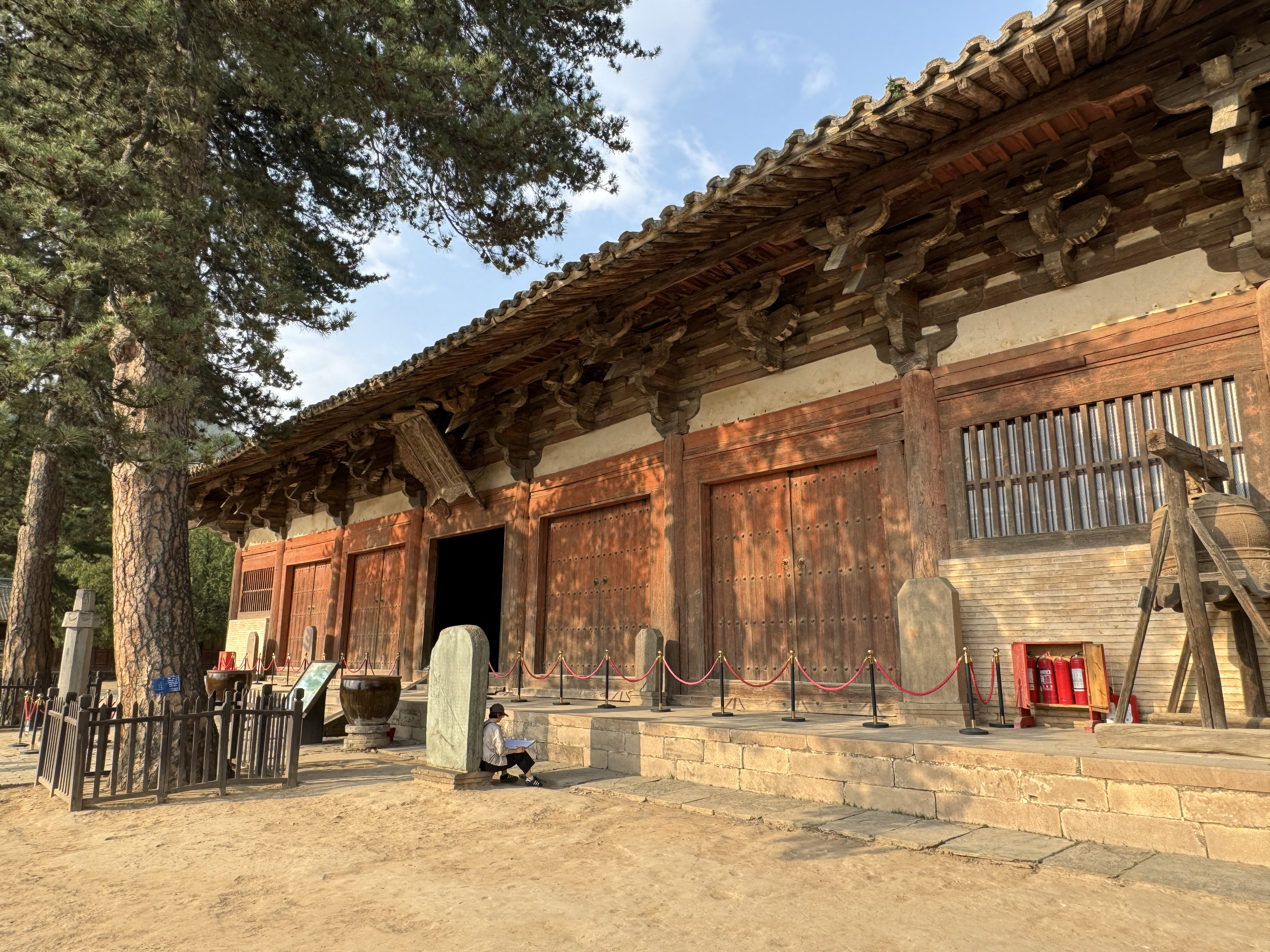
Front of the Dongda Hall

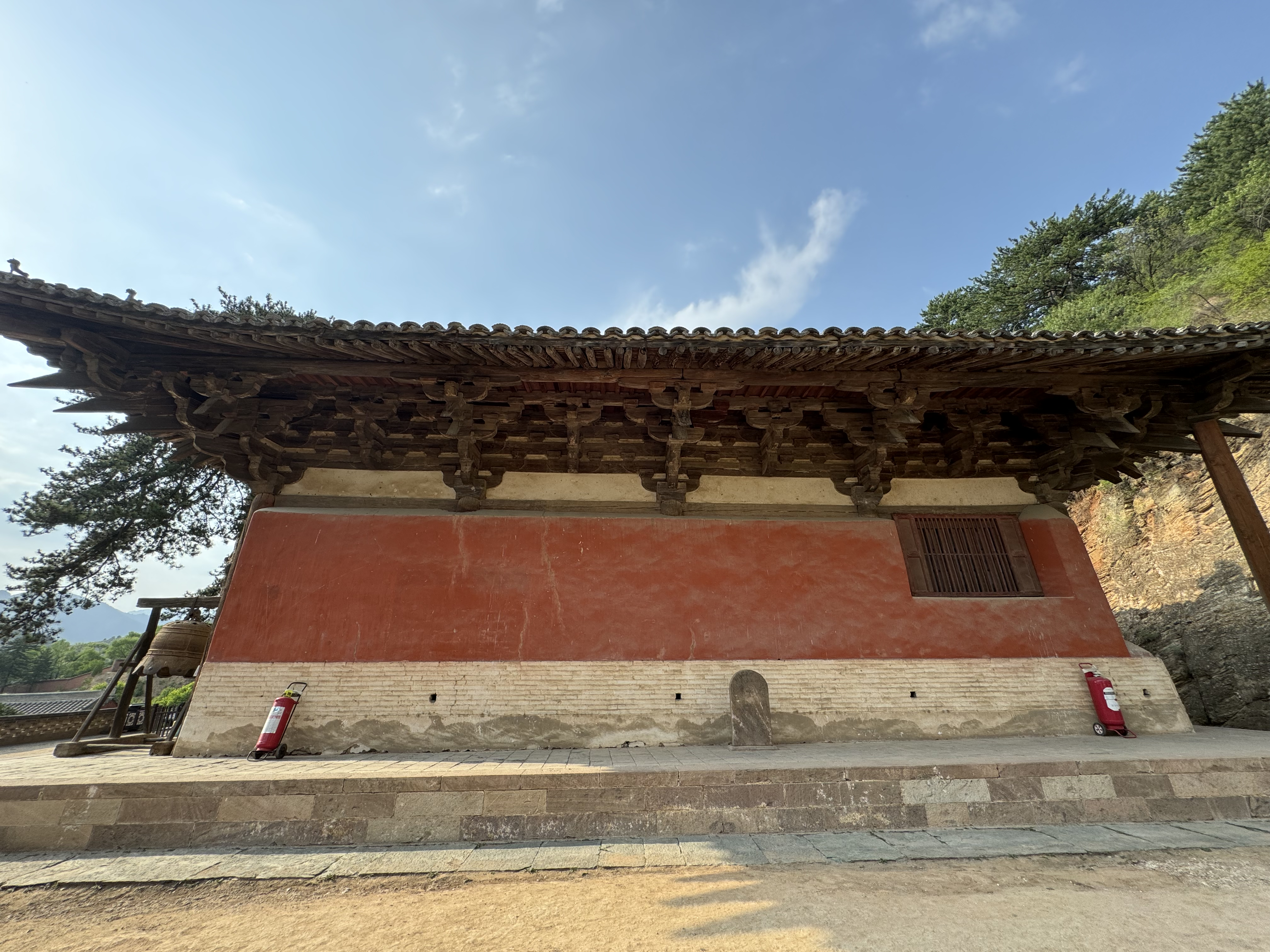
Side of the Dongda Hall

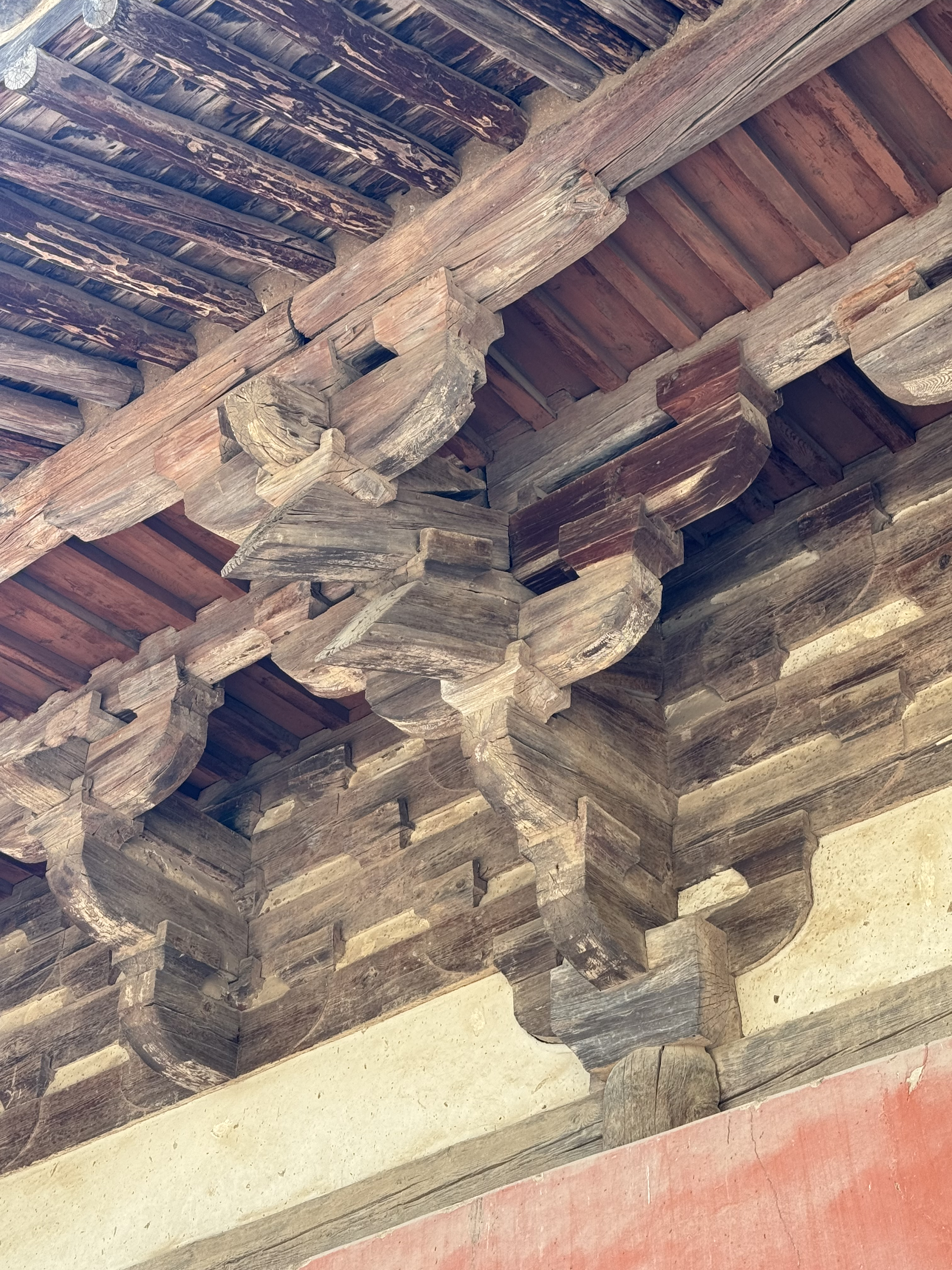
Dongda Hall Column Top Bracket Sets

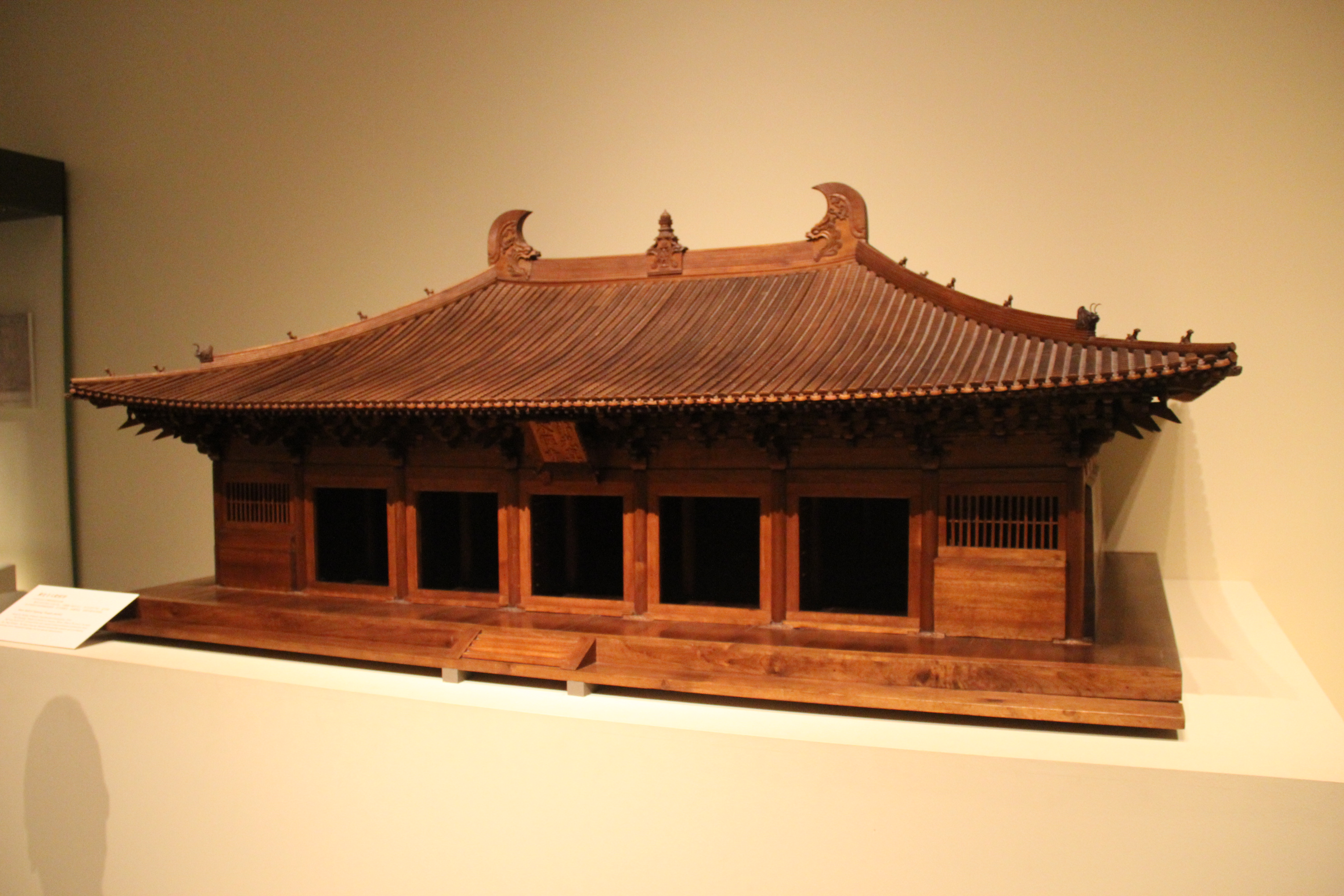
Model of the Great Hall.

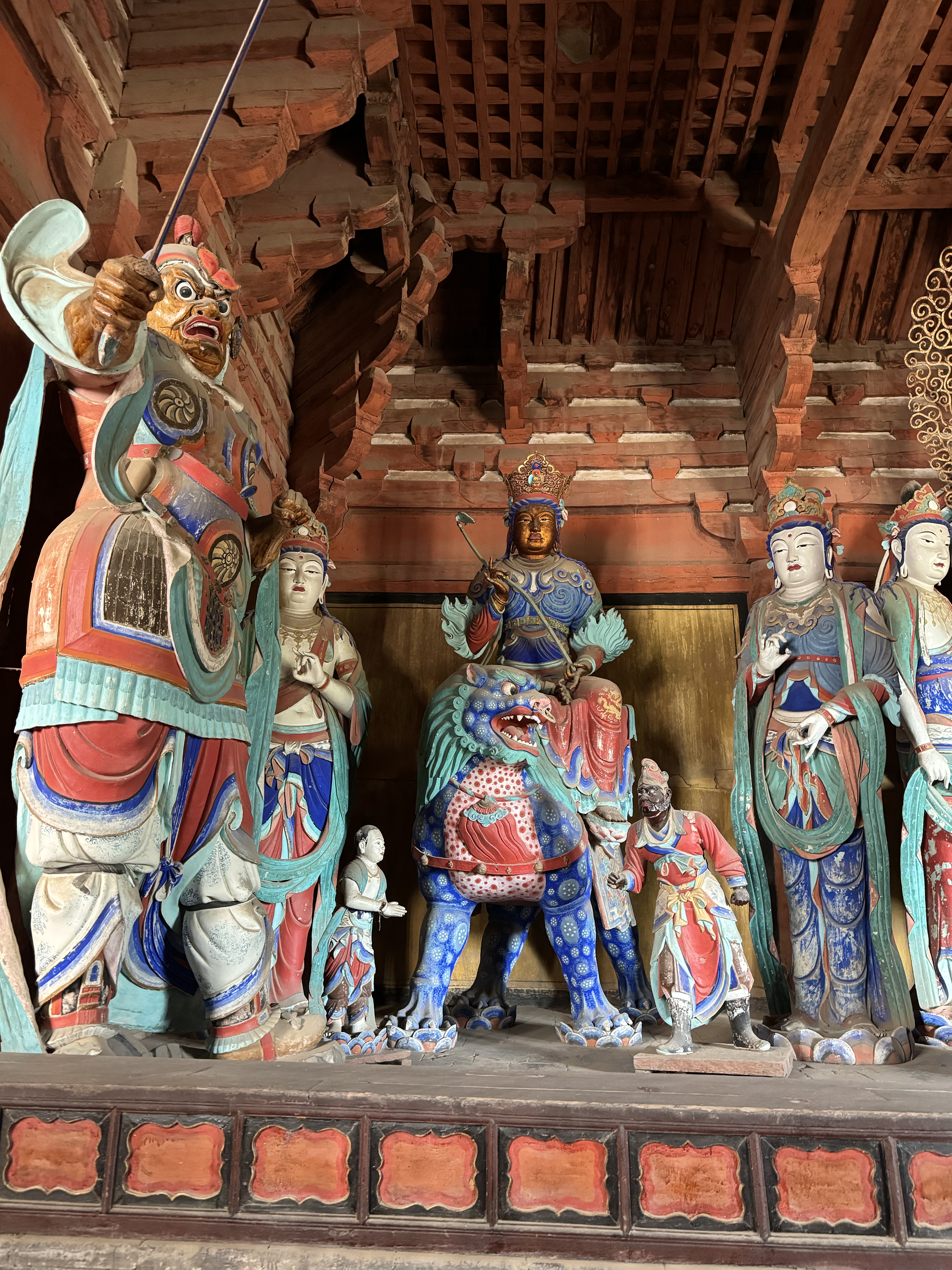
Wenshu (Manjushri) Group Statue

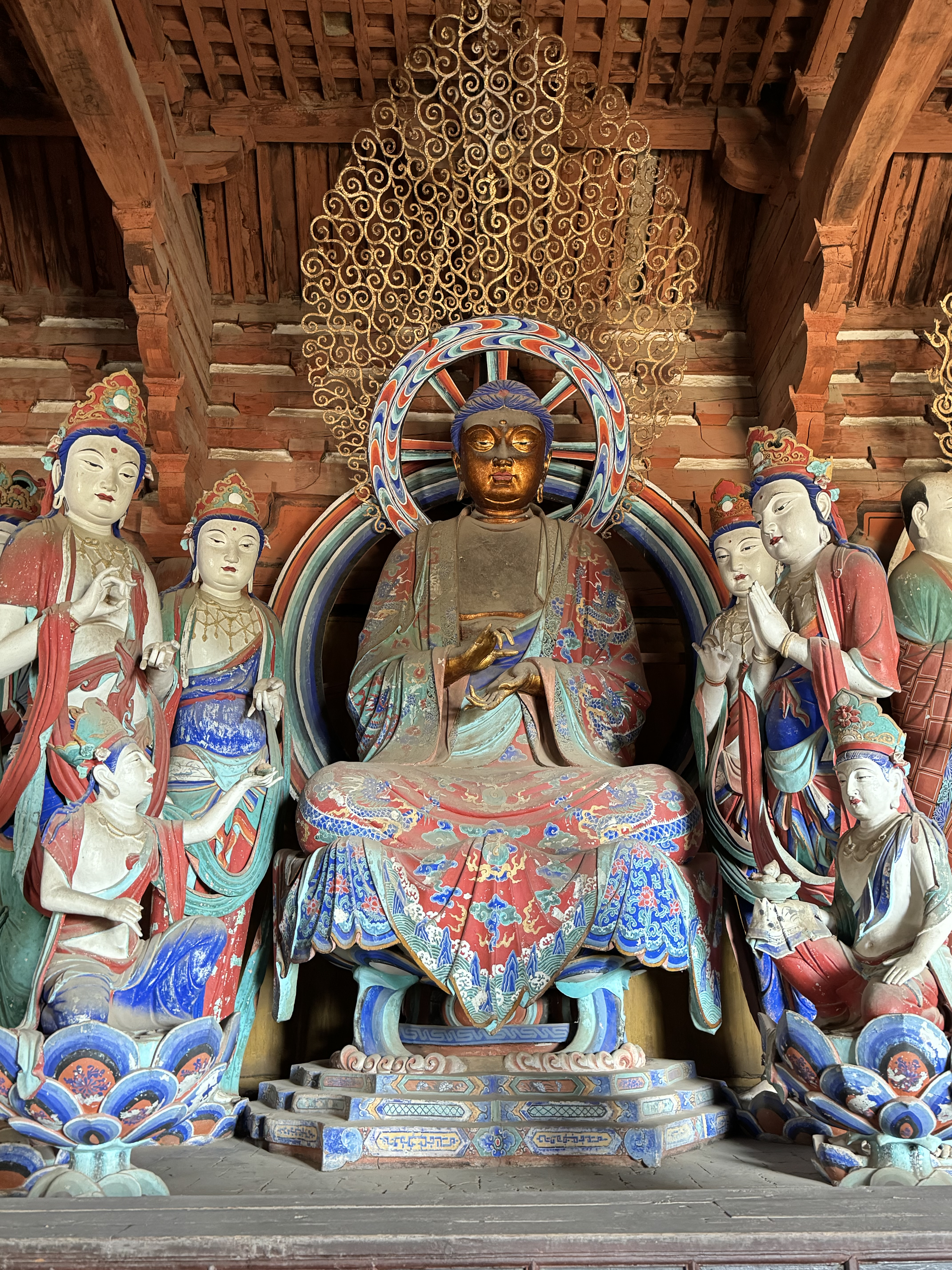
Amituofo (Amitabha) Group Statue

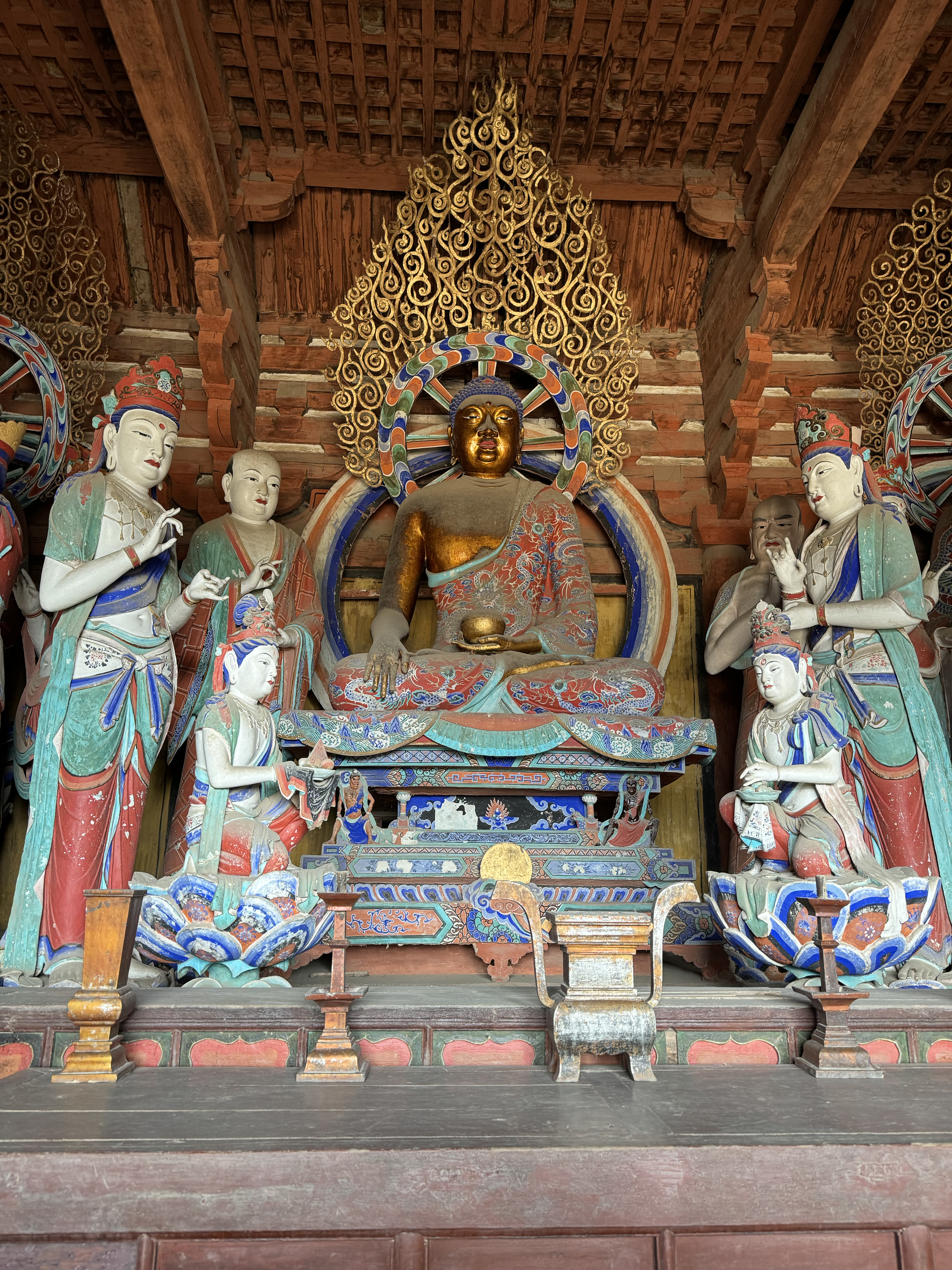
Shijiamounifo (Sakyamuni) Group Statue

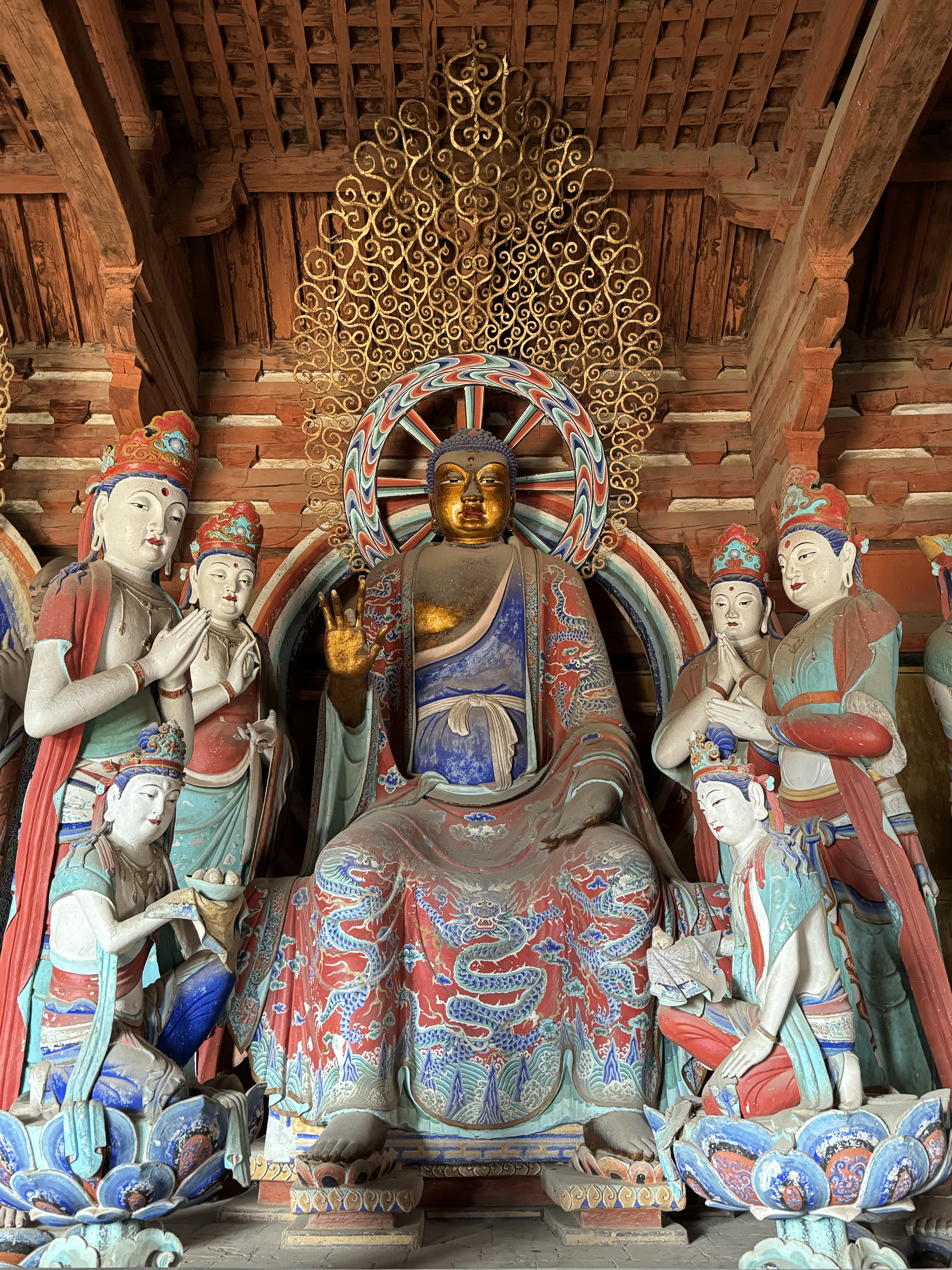
Mi Le Fo (Maitreya) Group Statue

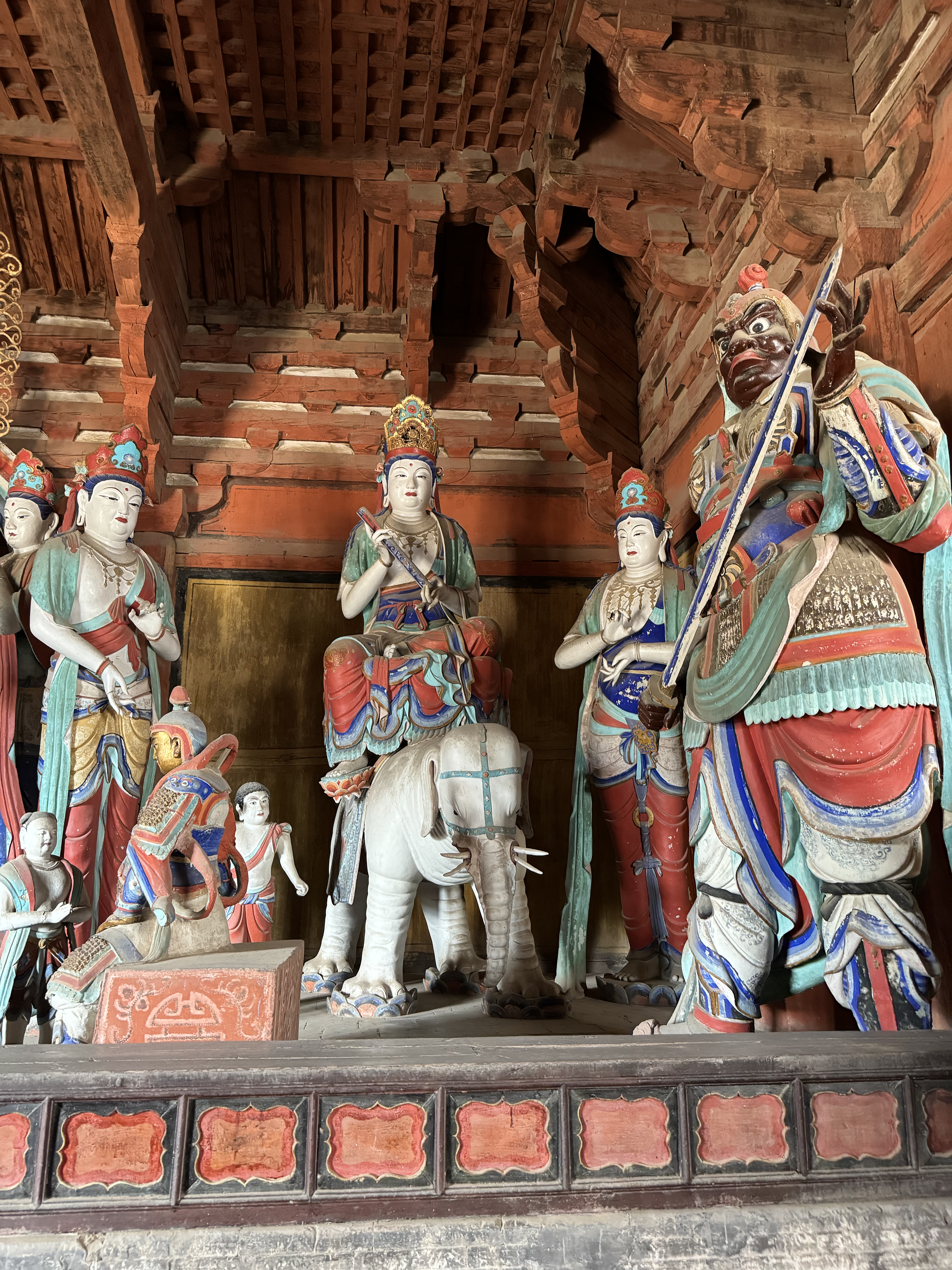
Puxian (Samantabhadra) Group Statue

=== Wenshu Hall ===
On the north side of the temple courtyard is the Wenshu Hall (文殊殿), meaning "Hall of Manjusri". It was constructed in 1137 during the Jin dynasty and is roughly the same size as the East Hall, also measuring seven bays by four. It is located on an 83 cm (2.7 ft) high platform, has three front doors and one central back door, and features a single-eave hip gable roof. The interior of the hall has only four support pillars. In order to support the large roof, diagonal beams are used. On each of the four walls are murals of arhats painted in 1429 during the Ming dynasty.

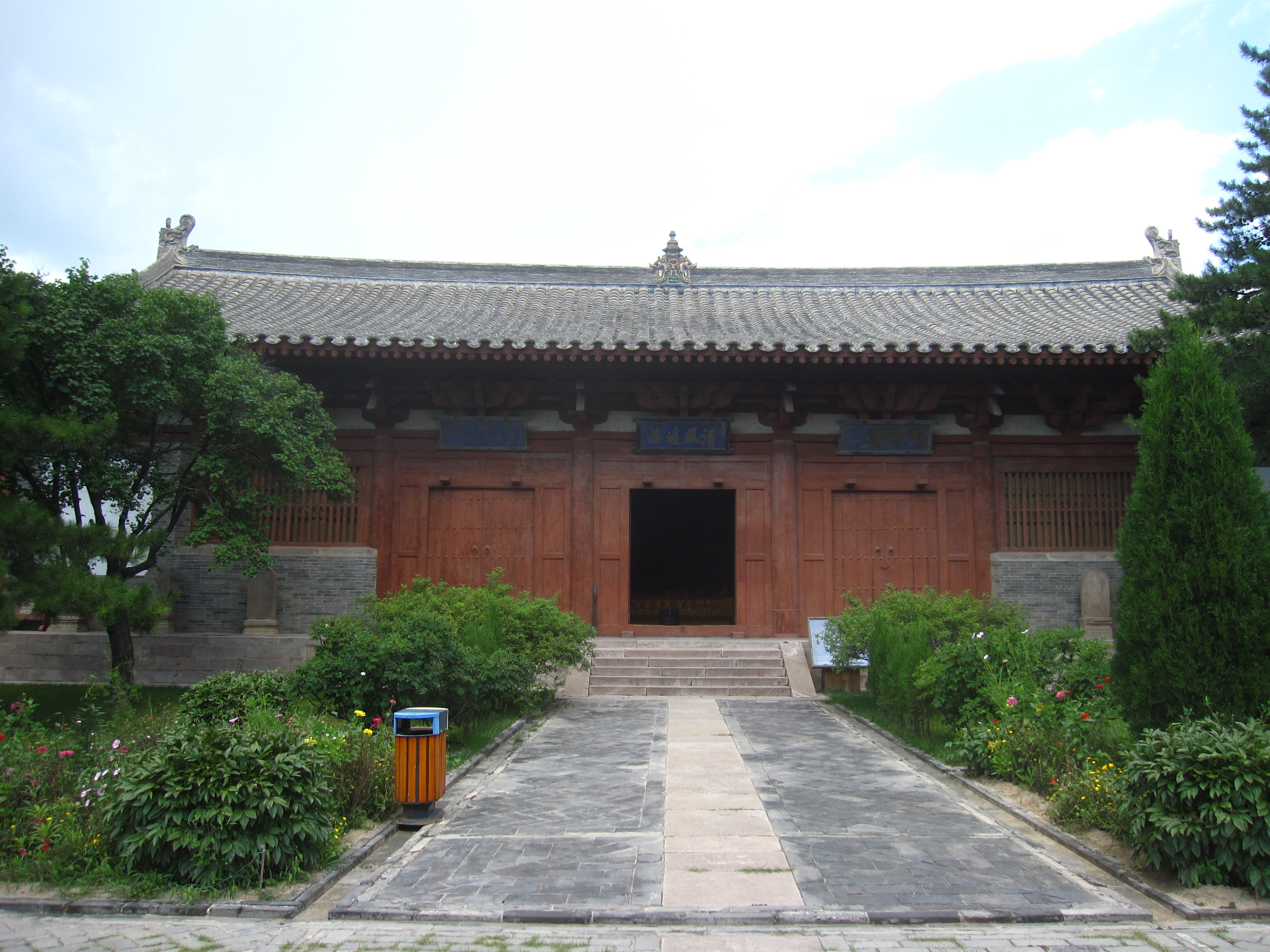
Wenshu Hall, built in 1137

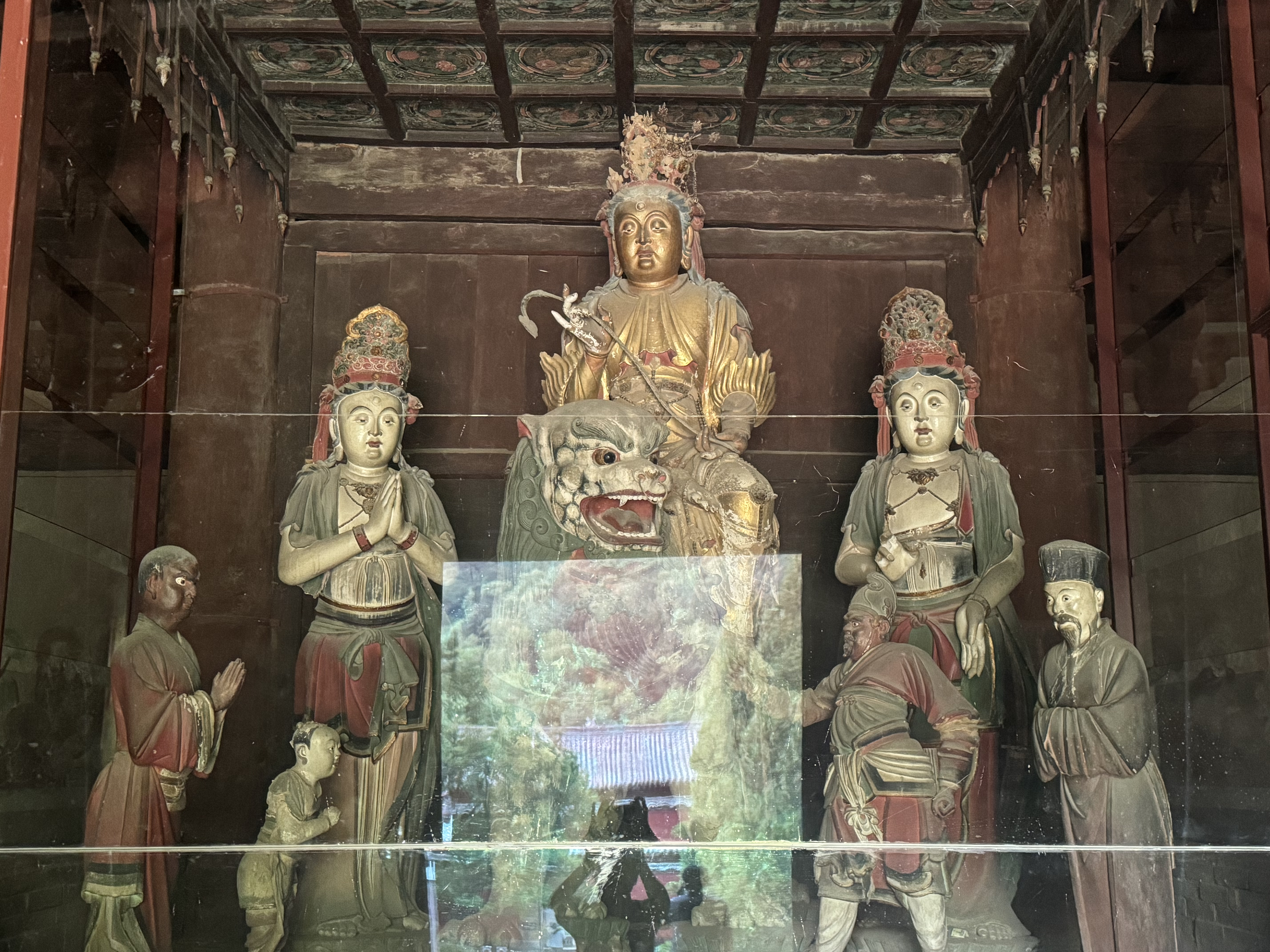
Jin Dynasty Wenshu (Manjushri) Group Statue

=== Zushi Pagoda ===
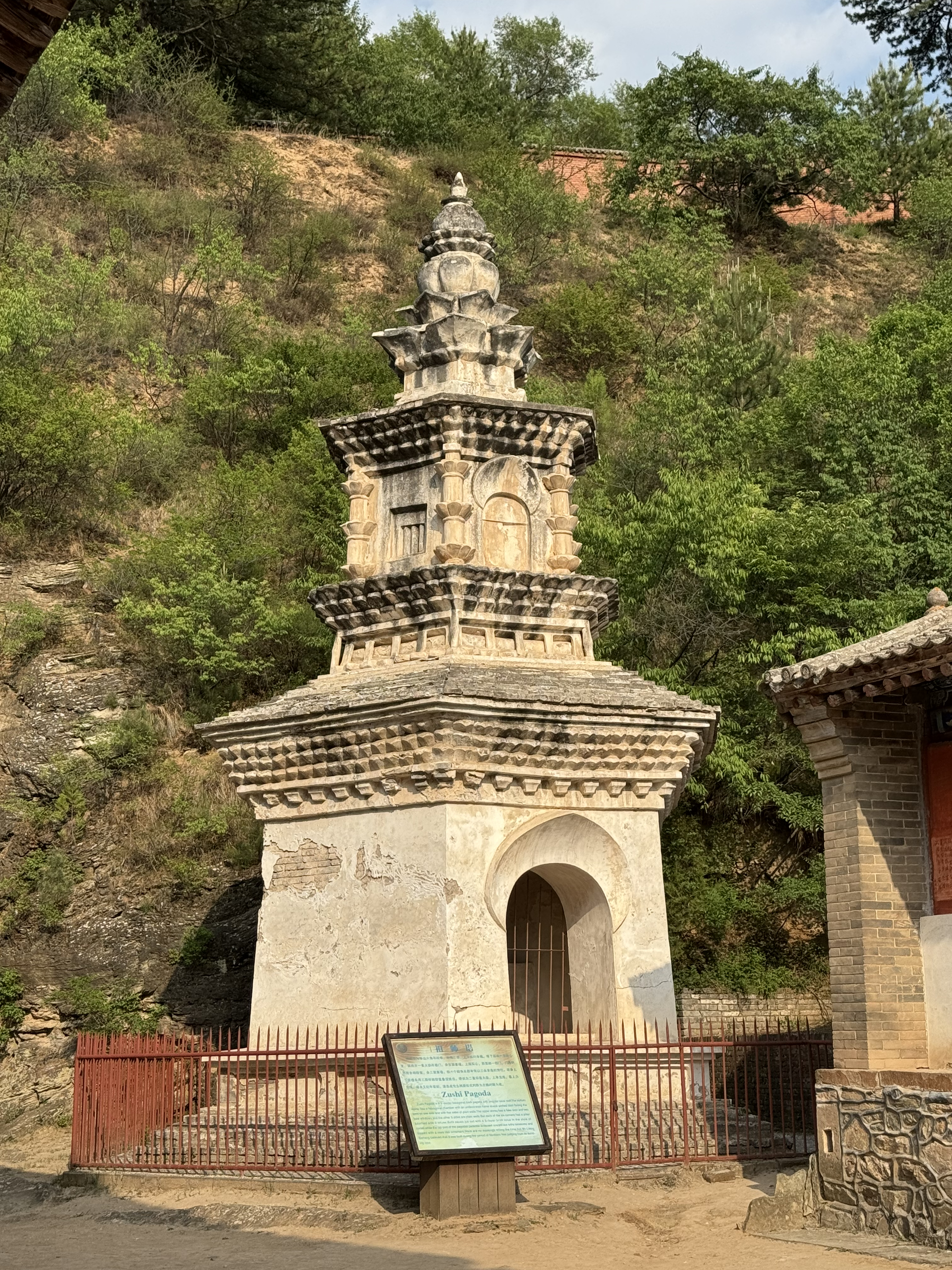
Zushi Pagoda

The Zushi Pagoda (祖师塔), meaning "Pagoda of the Patriarch", is a small funerary pagoda located to the south of the Dongda Hall. While it is unclear as to the exact date of its construction, it was either built during the Northern Wei dynasty (386–534) or Northern Qi dynasty (550–577) and possibly contains the tomb of the founder of the Foguang Temple. It is a white, hexagonal shaped 6-metre (20 ft) tall pagoda. The first storey of the pagoda has a hexagonal chamber, while the second storey is purely decorative. The pagoda is decorated with lotus petals and the steeple supports a precious bottle in the shape of a flower.

=== Funerary pillars ===
The temple grounds contain two Tang dynasty funerary pillars. The oldest one, which 3.24 meters (10.6 ft) tall and hexagonal, was built in 857 to record the East Hall's construction.

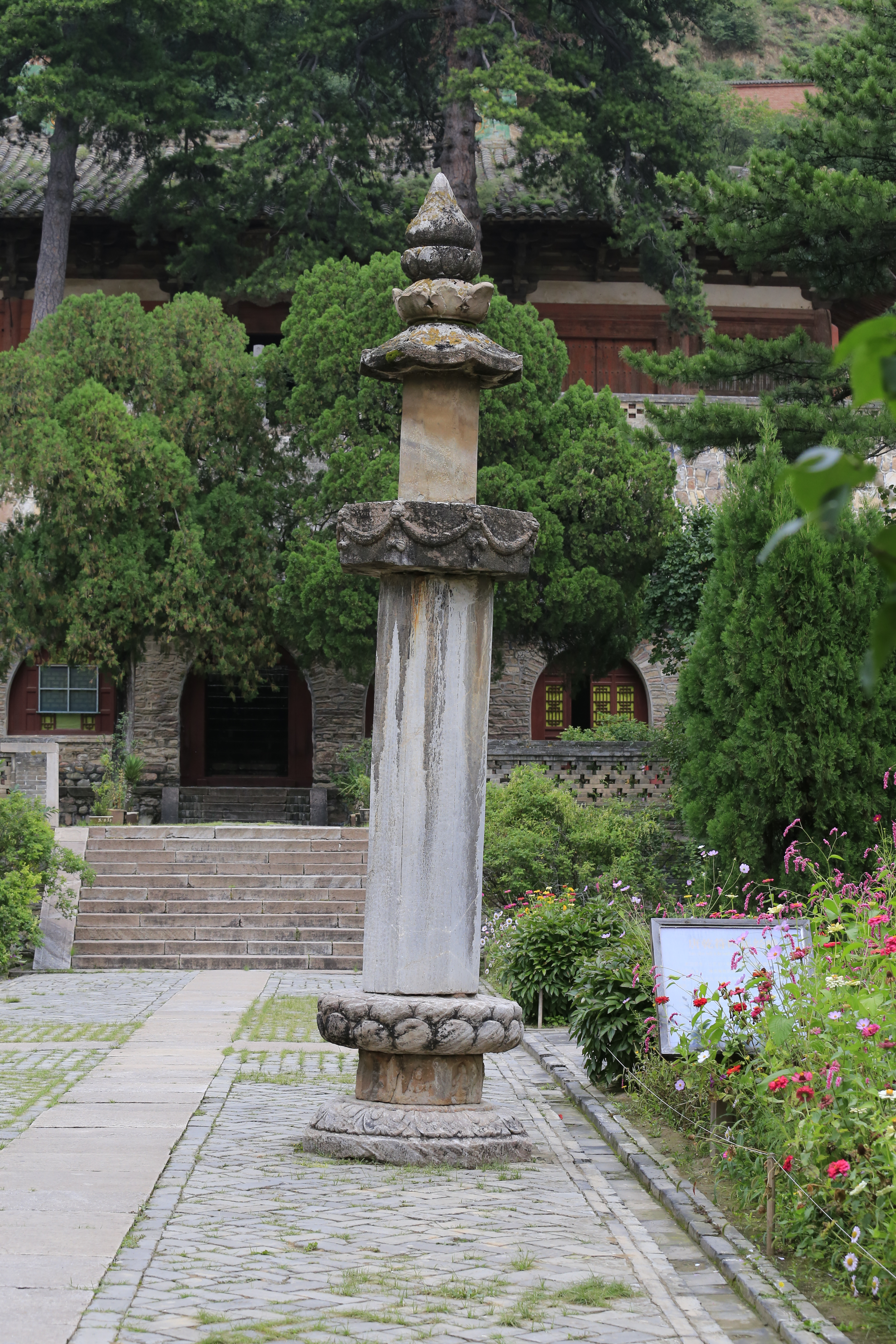
Funerary pillars That Was Inscribed Year 877

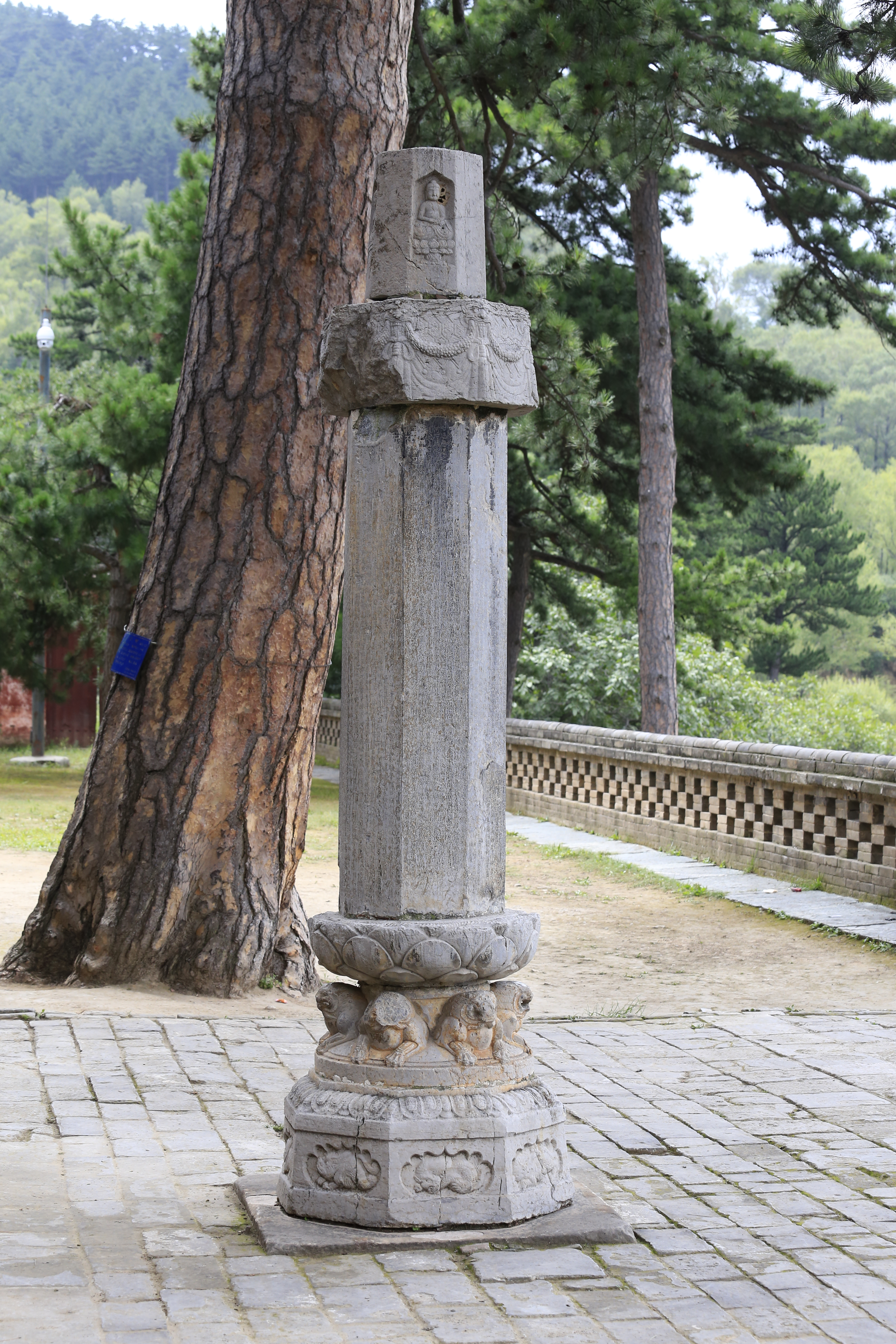
Funerary Pillars That Was Inscribed Year 857

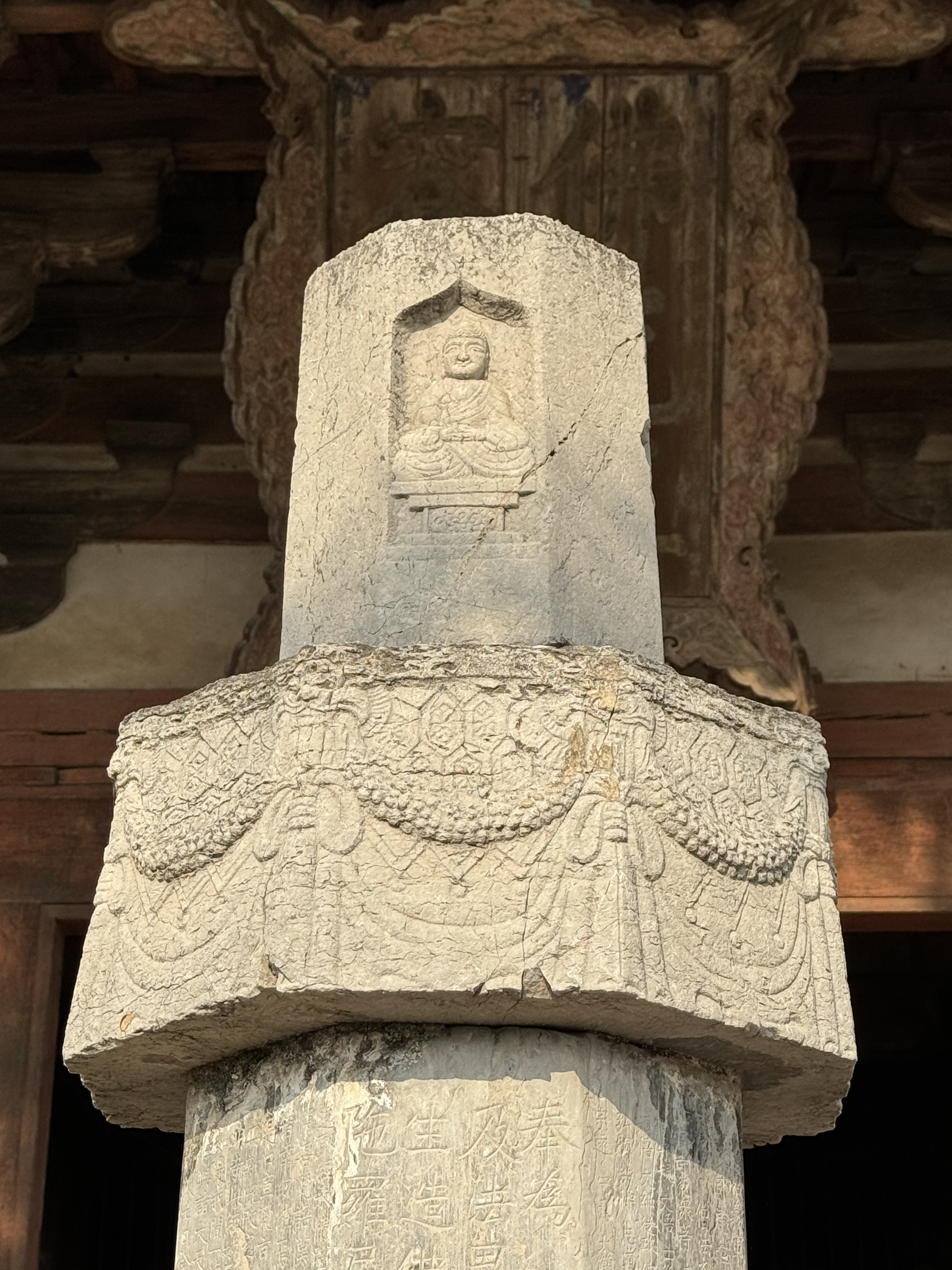
Top of the Funerary Pillars That Was Inscribed Year 857

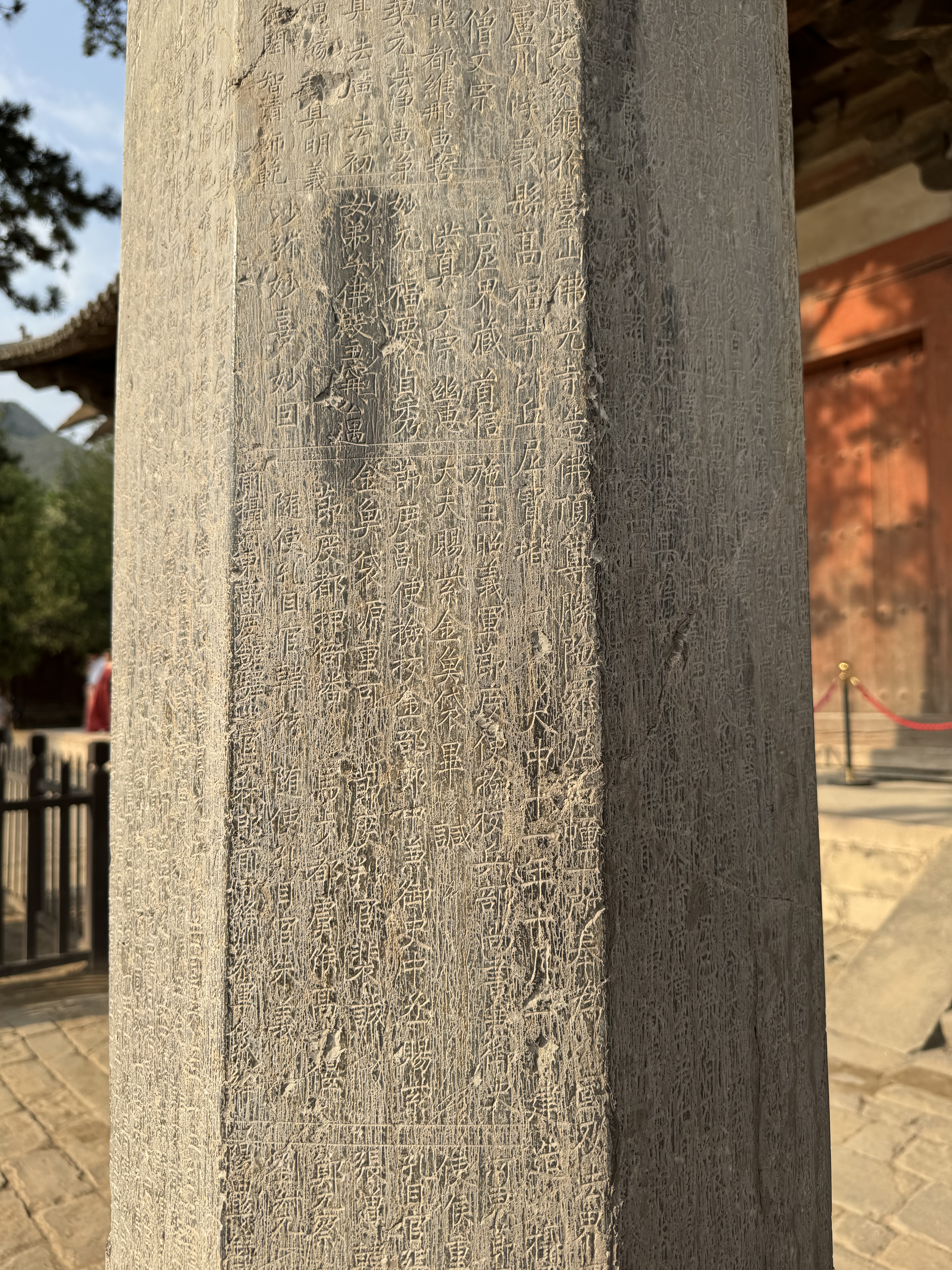
Funerary Pillars with the Inscription“大中十一年", Year 857

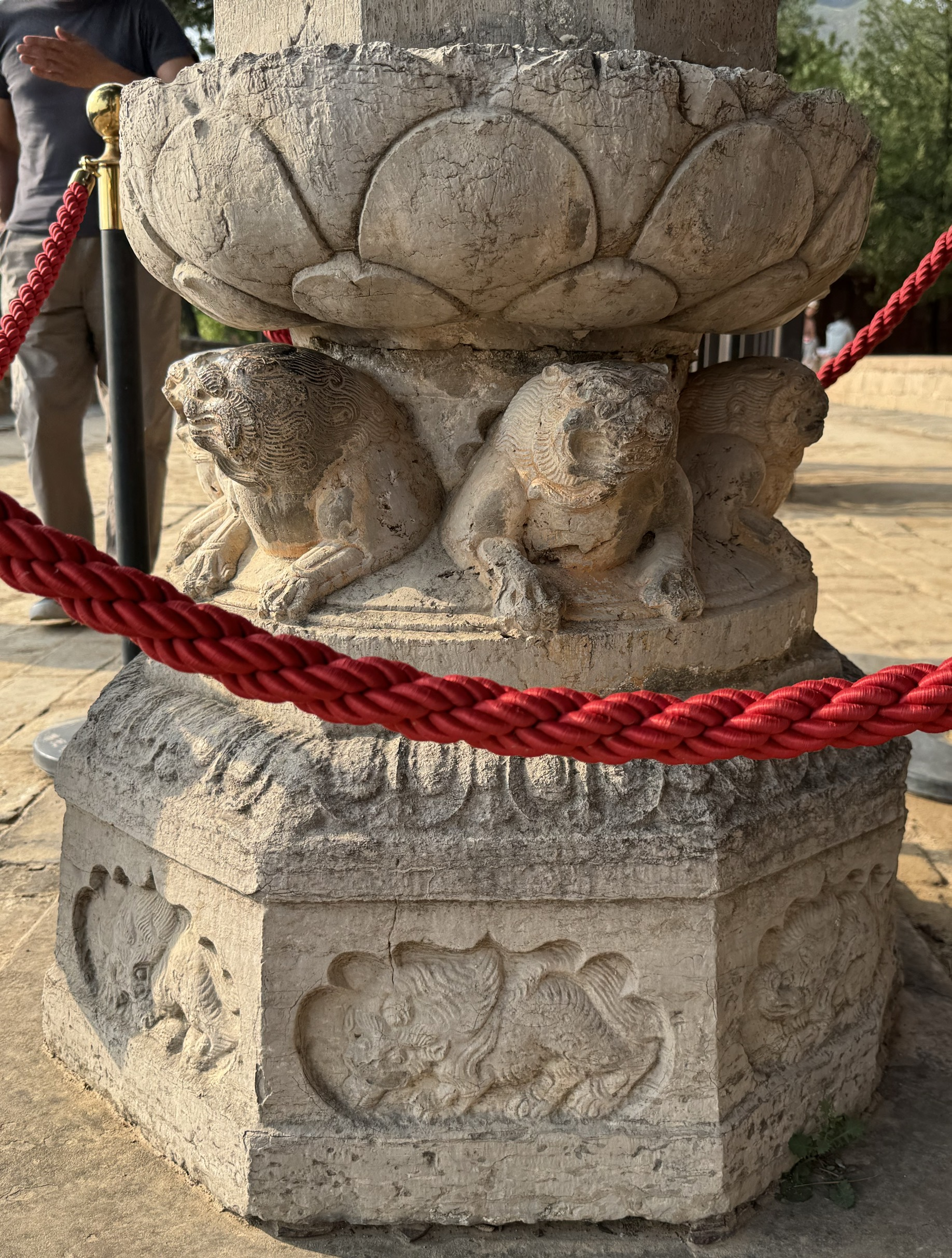
Bottom of the Funerary Pillars That Was Inscribed Year 857

== The present ==
Beginning in 2005, Global Heritage Fund (GHF), in partnership with Tsinghua University (Beijing), has been working to conserve the cultural heritage of Foguang Temple's Dongda Hall. The hall has not had any restoration work done since the 17th century, and suffers from water damage and rotting beams. Despite the temple undergoing restoration, it is still open to the public.

On June 26, 2009, the temple was inscribed as part of the Mount Wutai UNESCO World Heritage Site.

In 2025, the temple was selected for the UNESCO World Heritage Volunteers (WHV) Initiative as part of the 2025 campaign themed "Working on the Future." Announced at the 1st International Forum on Protecting Historic Buildings under Climate Change and Sustainable Development held in Taiyuan on 21 May, the project focuses on training young volunteers on the temple's history and climate-related risks, fostering public education and collaboration between official institutions and civil society in heritage conservation. It was one of 89 projects approved across 41 countries, and one of nine selected in China.

== See also ==
- Category:Tang dynasty architecture
- Mount Wutai
- Chinese art
- Chinese architecture
- List of Major National Historical and Cultural Sites in Shanxi
