= Zunsheng Temple =

Buddhist temple in Shanxi, China

Coordinates: 38.7874°N 113.3796°E

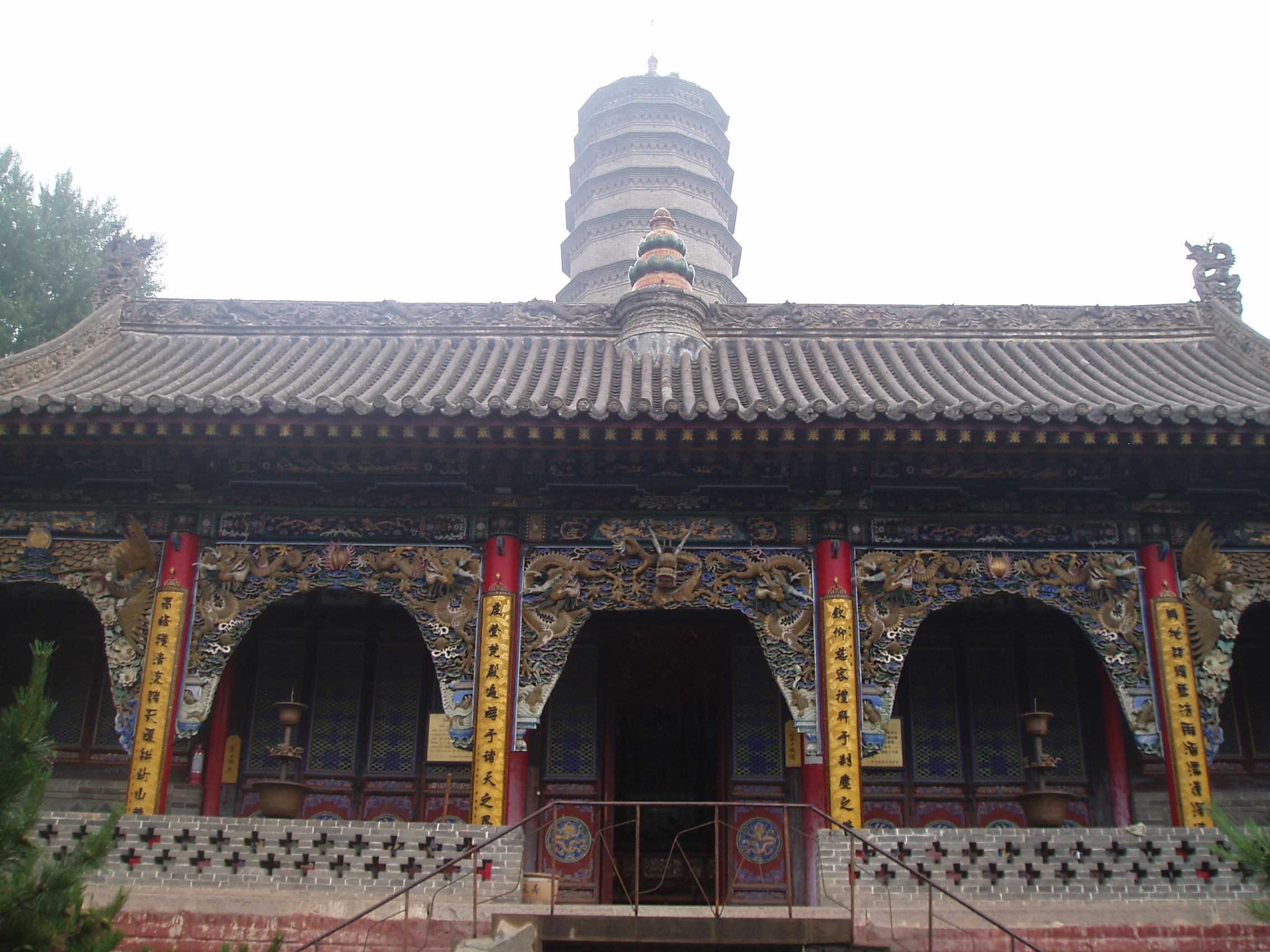

Zunsheng Temple (Chinese: 尊勝寺) is located in Huyangling, 20 km northeast of the seat of Wutai County.

It was founded in the Tang dynasty and was initially called "Shan Zhu Ge Yuan" (善住閣院). It was rebuilt in Tiansheng 4th year, Northern Song dynasty, and named "Zhen Rong Chan Yuan" (真容禪院). After renovation in Wanli 19th year of the Ming dynasty, it was named "Zunsheng Temple". And it was partly renovated in Tongzhi 7th year, Qing dynasty. The stele erected in Kangxi 24th year of the Qing dynasty recorded the history of the temple. Its current appearance reflected the renovation during the period of the Republic of China.

It has a land area of more than 32,000 square meters.
