= Jinge Temple =

Buddhist temple in Shanxi, China

Coordinates: 38°58′26″N 113°31′12″E

- 金阁寺
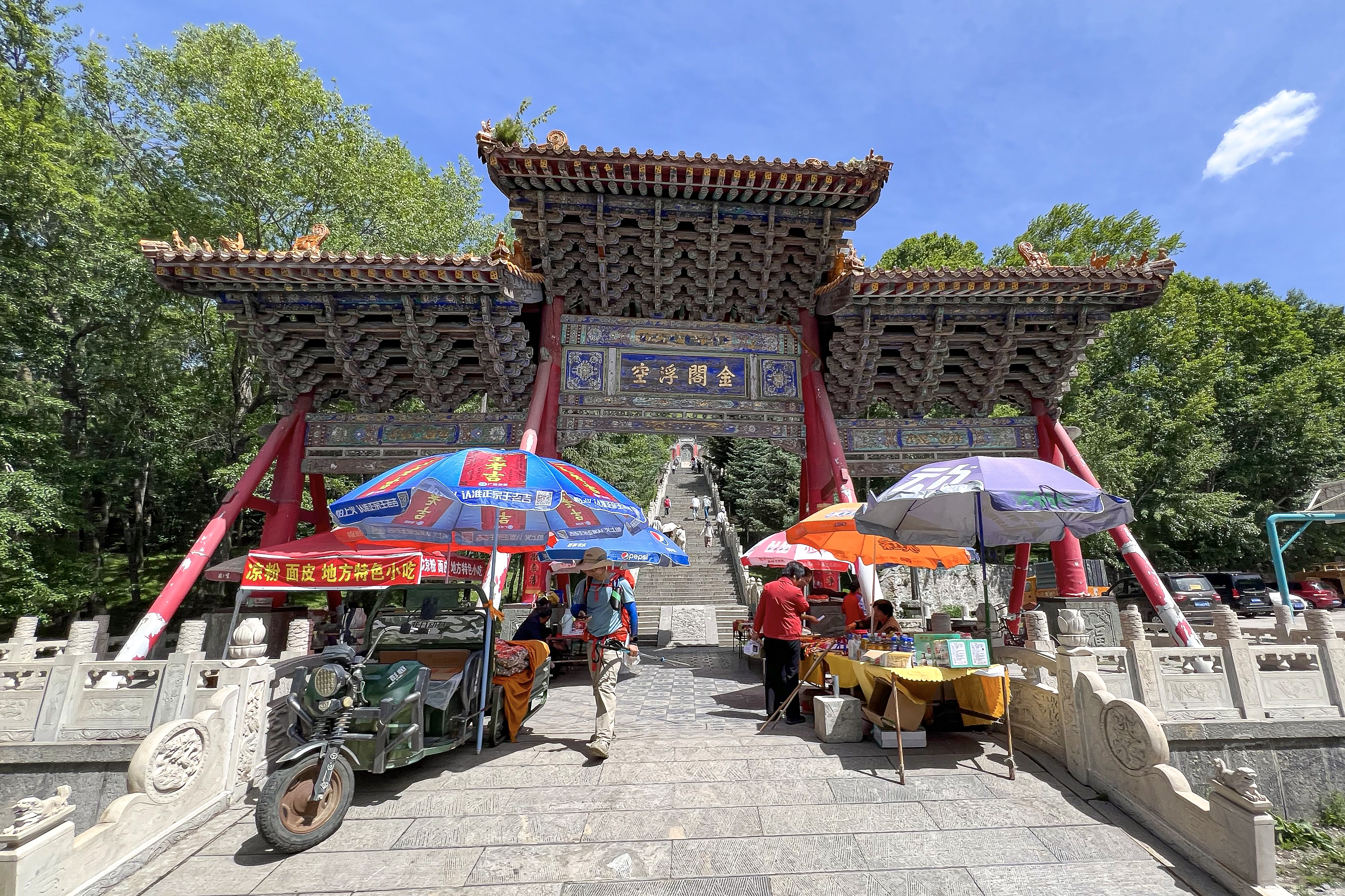

- Location within Shanxi

Religion
- Affiliation: Buddhism
- Sect: Chan Buddhism

Location
- Location: Wutai County, Shanxi, China

Architecture
- Style: Chinese architecture
- Founder: Shi Hanguang (释含光)
- Established: 767

Jinge Temple (simplified Chinese: 金阁寺; traditional Chinese: 金閣寺; pinyin: Jīngé Sì), or "Golden Pavilion Temple", is a Buddhist temple in Shanxi province, China.

The temple is located on Mount Wutai, north of the South Peak and south of the Central Peak, about 15 kilometres from Taihuai town. It is at an altitude of 1,900 meters, the highest besides those temples on the five peaks of Wutai.

Jinge Temple is closely associated with the monk Amoghavajra, an Indian master of Vajrayana Buddhism who lived during the Tang dynasty. The temple was built to promote the Manjushri, the bodhisattva of wisdom, as the protector of China.
