= Baiyun New Town =

Area of Guangzhou, China

Coordinates: 23.194886°N 113.274279°E

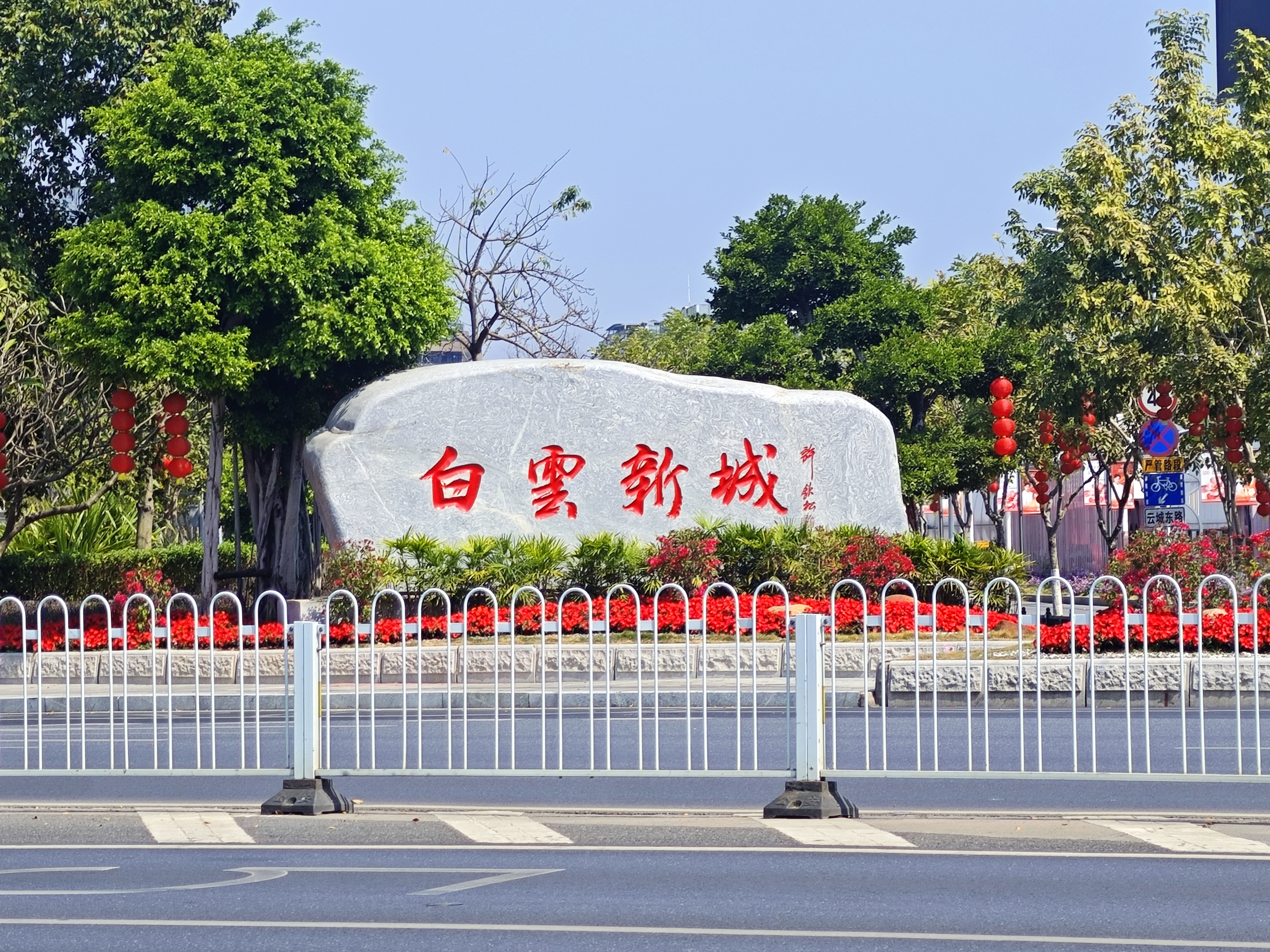
- Simplified Chinese: 白云新城
- Traditional Chinese: 白雲新城
Transcriptions
Standard Mandarin
- Hanyu Pinyin: Báiyún Xīnchéng
Yue: Cantonese
- Jyutping: baak6 wan4 san1 sing4

Baiyun New Town (Chinese: 白云新城) is a new central business district (CBD) in Baiyun District, Guangzhou, China, located around the former Baiyun Airport.

The CBD will be divided into six new communities: Huangshi (Chinese: 黄石), Xiaogang (Chinese: 萧岗), Jichang (Airport) (Chinese: 机场), Yunshan (Chinese: 云山), Chuangyi (Chinese: 创意) and Keziling (Chinese: 柯子岭). Xiaogang Village in the CBD will be redeveloped. New parks will be built around Baiyun Mountain, including Feixiang Park to the south and Community Park to the west. New buildings will be constructed, including an exhibition centre, the Guangdong Painting Academy, the Guangzhou Museum and the Guangdong Performance Centre.

== Transport ==
For transportation, Guangzhou Metro Line 2 and Line 14 will cut across the CBD.
