= Dongye, Wutai County =

Dongye 东冶镇
- Town
- Location in Shanxi
- Coordinates (Xinzhou government): 38°38′34″N 113°09′02″E
- Country: People's Republic of China
- Province: Shanxi
- Prefecture-level city: Xinzhou
- County: Wutai County

Population
  - Total: 37,748
- Time zone: UTC+8 (China Standard)

Dongye (simplified Chinese: 东冶; traditional Chinese: 東冶; pinyin: dōngyě) is a town in southwestern Wutai County, Xinzhou city, Shanxi province, China. As of 2020, it administers the following two residential communities and 19 villages:

- Dongsheng Community (东胜社区)
- Tuoyang Community (沱阳社区)
- Beijie Village (北街村)
- Xijie Village (西街村)
- Dongjie Village (东街村)
- Nanjie Village (南街村)
- Wuji Village (五级村)
- Huaiyin Village (槐阴村)
- Beidaxing First Village (北大兴一村)
- Beidaxing Second Village (北大兴二村)
- Beidaxing Third Village (北大兴三村)
- Nandaxing Village (南大兴村)
- Xihe Village (西河村)
- Yong'an Village (永安村)
- Yongxing Village (永兴村)
- Wenxing Village (文兴村)
- Shi Village (石村)
- Qianpu Village (前堡村)
- Xinpu Village (新堡村)
- Dapu Village (大朴村)
- Wangjinggang Village (望景岗村)

== See also ==
- List of township-level divisions of Shanxi
