= Jiangfang Township, Wutai County =

Jiangfang Township
- Township

Chinese transcription(s)
  - Simplified: 蒋坊乡
  - Traditional: 蔣坊鄉
  - Pinyin: Jiăngfāng Xiāng
- Location in Shanxi.
- Coordinates: 38°48′27″N 113°24′46″E
- Country: China
- Province: Shanxi
- Prefecture: Xinzhou
- County: Wutai County
- Time zone: UTC+8 (China Standard)
- Postal code: 035502
- Area code: 0350

Jiangfang Township (Chinese: 蒋坊乡) is a rural township in Wutai County, Shanxi, China. The township nestles snugly at the foot of Mount Wutai. It is located in the south of Wutai County. It is surrounded by Lingjing Township on the north, Doucun Town on the west, Geng Town on the east, and Rucun Township on the south.

== Administrative division ==
As of 2015, the township is divided into 22 villages: Jiangfang (蒋坊村), Siyang (泗阳村), Xiaonanpo (小南坡村), Xixia (西峡村), Dongxia (东峡村), Xiakou (峡口村), Tianjing (天井村), Shibei (石贝村), Xiufeng (秀峰村), Songlin (松林村), Weimozhuang (维磨庄村), Dayukou (大峪口村), Xujiazhuang (许家庄村), Gusi (古寺村), Wangyan (王岩村), Pailouyan (牌楼岩村), Tiantang (天堂村), Taobogou (桃卜沟村), Poposi (婆婆寺村), Nan'angou (南岸沟村), Wacha (瓦岔村) and Dianjun (殿军村).

== Transport ==
The Provincial Highway S310 passes across the township.

== Tourist attractions ==
The Wenbi Pagoda (Chinese: 文笔塔) was built in the Qing dynasty (1644–1911). The base of the pagoda is round and built with natural stone. It is 3.5-metre (11 ft) high and 2.7-metre (8 ft 10 in) in diameter. It covers an area of 7.3-square-metre (79 sq ft).
