= Wutai County =

Wutai County 五台县
- County
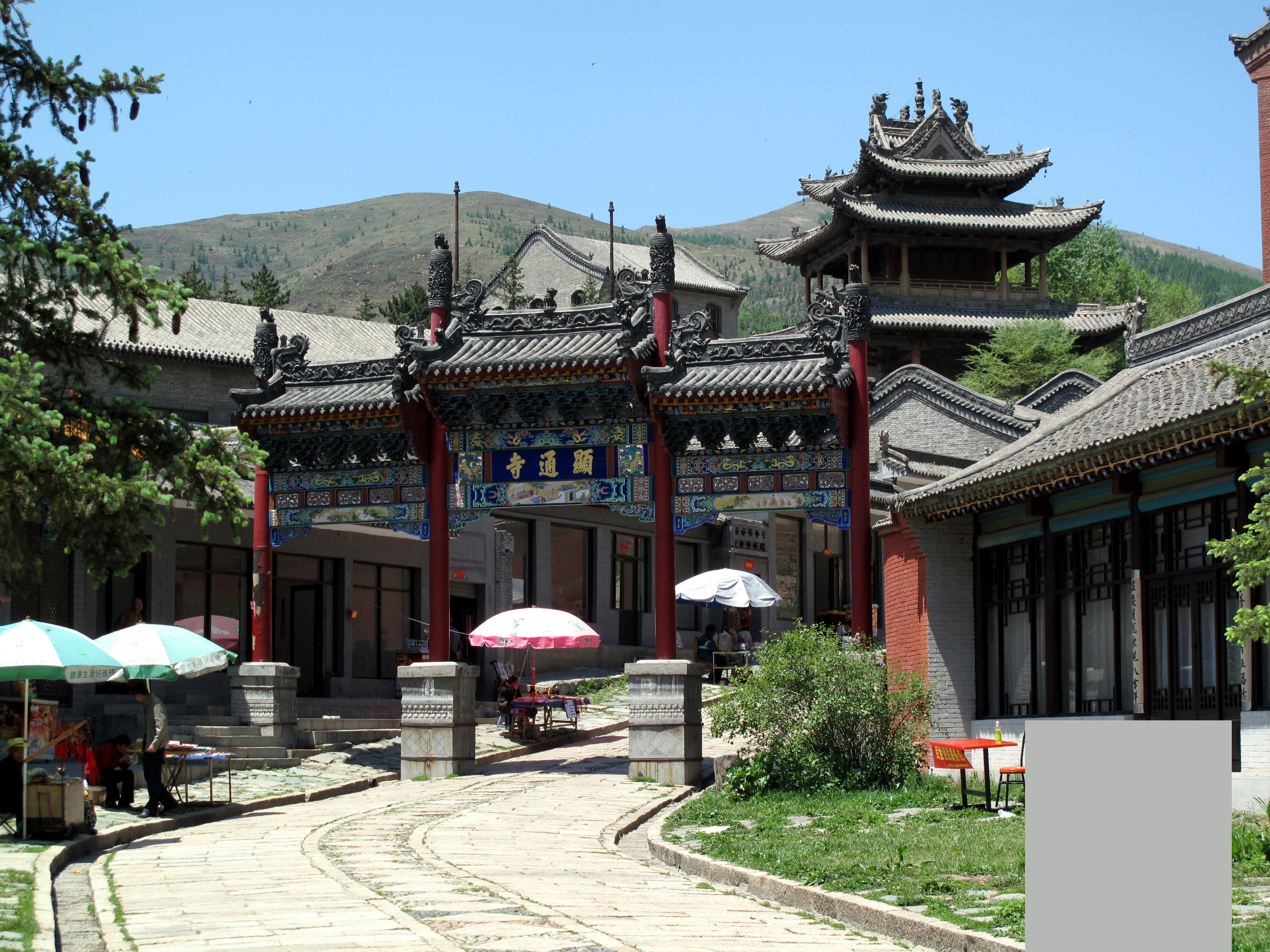
- Xiantong Temple

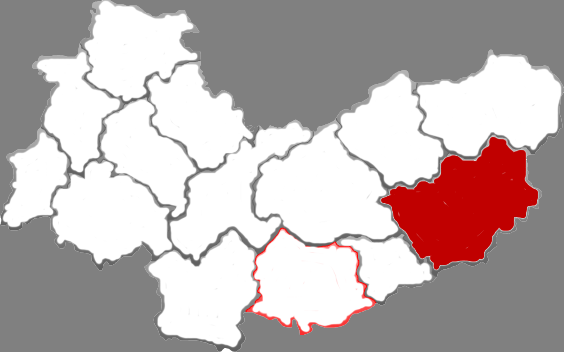
- Location in Xinzhou

- Location of the seat in Shanxi
- Coordinates (Wutai County government): 38°43′42″N 113°15′19″E
- Country: People's Republic of China
- Province: Shanxi
- Prefecture-level city: Xinzhou

Area
  - Total: 2,865 km^{2} (1,106 sq mi)

Population (2018)
  - Total: 307,200
  - Density: 107.2/km^{2} (277.7/sq mi)
- Time zone: UTC+8 (China Standard)
- Postal code: 035500
- Website: http://www.wutai.gov.cn/

Wutai County (Chinese: 五台县; pinyin: Wǔtái Xiàn) is a county under the administration of the prefecture-level city of Xinzhou, in the northeast of Shanxi Province, China, bordering Hebei province to the east. It is named after Mount Wutai, which is located within its borders. It was the birthplace of Chinese Warlord and General Yan Xishan. The county spans an area of 2,865 square kilometers, and has a permanent population of 307,200 as of 2018.

== Geography ==
Wutai County is located in northeastern Shanxi Province under the administration of Xinzhou. The county has an average altitude of 1,200 metres, with a low point of 640 meters at the intersection of the Qingshui River and the Hutou River, and a high point of 3,058 metres at Mount Wutai.

== Climate ==
Climate data for Wutai, elevation 1,096 m (3,596 ft), (1991–2020 normals, extremes 1991–present)
Month	Jan	Feb	Mar	Apr	May	Jun	Jul	Aug	Sep	Oct	Nov	Dec	Year
Record high °C (°F)	12.5 (54.5)	18.3 (64.9)	25.6 (78.1)	34.4 (93.9)	35.2 (95.4)	39.5 (103.1)	37.2 (99.0)	33.5 (92.3)	32.5 (90.5)	28.6 (83.5)	22.4 (72.3)	13.2 (55.8)	39.5 (103.1)
Mean daily maximum °C (°F)	0.1 (32.2)	3.9 (39.0)	10.2 (50.4)	17.8 (64.0)	23.5 (74.3)	26.9 (80.4)	27.9 (82.2)	26.4 (79.5)	22.1 (71.8)	16.1 (61.0)	8.0 (46.4)	1.3 (34.3)	15.4 (59.6)
Daily mean °C (°F)	−9.3 (15.3)	−5.0 (23.0)	1.7 (35.1)	9.3 (48.7)	15.4 (59.7)	19.3 (66.7)	21.2 (70.2)	19.4 (66.9)	14.1 (57.4)	7.5 (45.5)	−0.6 (30.9)	−7.4 (18.7)	7.1 (44.8)
Mean daily minimum °C (°F)	−16.4 (2.5)	−12.1 (10.2)	−5.6 (21.9)	1.1 (34.0)	7.1 (44.8)	12.0 (53.6)	15.3 (59.5)	13.7 (56.7)	7.5 (45.5)	0.7 (33.3)	−6.9 (19.6)	−13.8 (7.2)	0.2 (32.4)
Record low °C (°F)	−29.5 (−21.1)	−27.0 (−16.6)	−20.7 (−5.3)	−10.4 (13.3)	−4.2 (24.4)	3.0 (37.4)	6.5 (43.7)	3.1 (37.6)	−5.5 (22.1)	−9.4 (15.1)	−24.0 (−11.2)	−32.0 (−25.6)	−32.0 (−25.6)
Average precipitation mm (inches)	2.6 (0.10)	5.4 (0.21)	9.8 (0.39)	20.6 (0.81)	39.1 (1.54)	70.9 (2.79)	138.4 (5.45)	134.8 (5.31)	63.2 (2.49)	29.0 (1.14)	12.1 (0.48)	2.6 (0.10)	528.5 (20.81)
Average precipitation days (≥ 0.1 mm)	1.8	2.9	4.2	5.2	7.9	12.6	14.6	14.1	9.7	6.0	3.5	1.8	84.3
Average snowy days	3.1	4.3	4.6	1.6	0.2	0	0	0	0	0.5	3.4	3.4	21.1
Average relative humidity (%)	52	49	46	45	49	62	75	79	75	65	60	54	59
Mean monthly sunshine hours	192.3	193.6	232.5	243.0	269.5	236.2	218.8	209.3	204.3	215.4	193.1	193.3	2,601.3
Percentage possible sunshine	63	63	62	61	61	53	49	50	56	63	65	66	59
Source: China Meteorological Administration

== Administrative divisions ==
Wutai County is furtherly divided into 5 towns, 11 townships, and 1 county resident's office. The county government is seated in the town of Taicheng.

=== Towns ===
The county's 5 towns are Taicheng, Gengzhen, Doucun, Baijiazhuang, and Dongye.

=== Townships ===
The county's 11 townships are Gounan Township, Donglei Township, Gaohongkou Township, Menxianshi Township, Chenjiazhuang Township, Jian'an Township, Shenxi Township, Jiangfang Township, Lingjing Township, Yangbai Township, and Rucun Township.

=== Wutai County Resident Office ===
The county is also home to the Wutai County Resident Office (五台县居民办事处), which functions as a township-level division of the county.

== Demographics ==
Of the county's 307,200 permanent residents, 126,200 (41.08%) lived in urban areas as of 2018, whereas the remaining 181,000 (58.92%) lived in rural areas.

Wutai County has a per capita disposable income of 12,838 Yuan, with urban residents averaging 26,643 Yuan and rural residents averaging 6,787 Yuan. The Engel Coefficient for urban households is 27.6%, and is 32.1% for rural households.

== Economy ==
The county reported a GDP of 4.953 billion Yuan in 2018, of which, 0.536 billion (10.83%) came from the county's primary sector, 1.789 billion (36.11%) came from the county's secondary sector, and 2.628 billion (53.06%) came from the county's tertiary sector. In 2018, Wutai County recorded 676.90 million Yuan in tax revenue and 1.99 billion Yuan in retail sales. Real estate investment and sales totaled 236 million Yuan in 2018, a 36.4% increase from 2017.

=== Agriculture ===
Major agricultural products in the county include corn, wheat, millet, and beans.

=== Industry ===
Major industries in the county include coal mining, magnesium alloys, and power generation.

== Education ==
As of 2018, the county had 5,253 pre-school students, 14,954 primary school students, 9,076 junior high students, 4,512 standard secondary school students, and 1,998 vocational secondary school students. That year, Wutai County had 21 kindergartens, 28 primary schools, 24 standard junior high schools, 3 standard secondary schools, and 1 vocational secondary school.

== Culture ==
The county is home to a number of cultural sights, including a number of historic temples. Major sights include Mount Wutai, Foguang Temple, Zunsheng Temple, Nanchan Temple, Xiantong Temple, Guangji Temple, Yanqing Temple, Shuxiang Temple, Jinge Temple, Bishan Temple, Yuanzhao Temple, Nanshan Temple, Pusading, Tayuan Temple, the Former Residence of Xu Xiangqian, and the Former headquarters of the Jinchaji Military Command.

== See also ==
- Foguang Temple
- Zunsheng Temple
