= Bishan Temple =

Chinese Buddhist temple

- 碧山寺
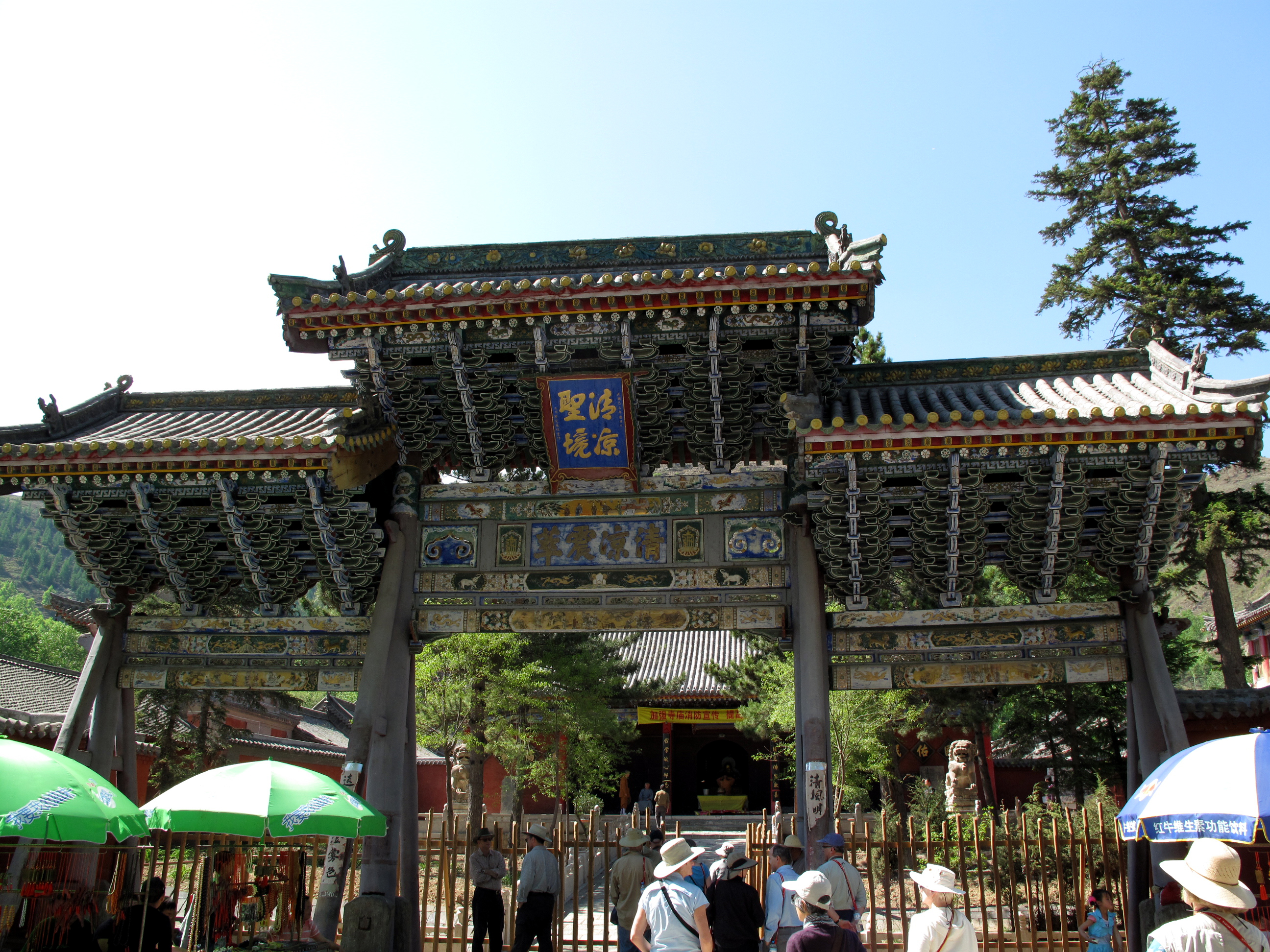
- The paifang at Bishan Temple.

- Location within Shanxi

Religion
- Affiliation: Buddhism
- Sect: Chan Buddhism

Location
- Location: Wutai County, Shanxi, China
- Interactive map of Bishan Temple
- Coordinates: 39°01′46″N 113°36′48″E

Architecture
- Style: Chinese architecture
- Established: Emperor Xiaowen of Northern Wei (467-499)

The Bishan Temple or Guangji Maopeng (Chinese: 碧山寺; pinyin: Bìshān Sì or simplified Chinese: 广济茅蓬; traditional Chinese: 廣濟茅蓬; pinyin: Guǎngjì Máopéng) is a Buddhist temple located in Taihuai Town of Wutai County, Xinzhou, Shanxi, China.

== History ==
In the Qingliangshan Annals, a poem described Bishan Temple as "落日碧山寺，萧然古涧边，白云生翠崦，明月下寒泉。".

Baiyun Temple was first established in the reign of Emperor Xiaowen of Northern Wei (467-499) and initially called "Beishan Temple" (北山寺).

In the period of Emperor Yingzong of Ming (1435-1449 and 1457-1464) in the Ming dynasty (1368-1644), it was renamed "Puji Temple" (普济寺).

In the reign of the Qianlong Emperor (1711-1799), because the temple is surrounded by mountains, it is also called Bishan Temple. Later in the reign of Emperor Xuantong (1908-1912), it was also named "Guangji Maopeng" (广济茅蓬).

In 1983 it has been designated as a "National Key Buddhist Temples in Han Chinese Area".

On August 26, 2017, master Dayun (达云法师), a student of Chan master Miaojiang (妙江长老) served as abbot of Biyun Temple.

== Architecture ==
=== Paifang ===
Under the paifang is a horizontal inscribed board with the Chinese characters "清凉震萃". A wooden plaque with a couplet is hung on the two side pillars. It says "敷演清凉，四时瑞雪常飘，幻出银装世界。恢宏极乐，六月莲花始放，翻成金色乾坤。".

=== Tianwang Dian ===
Tue bodhisattva Mi Le is enshrined in the Tianwang Dian, or Hall of the Four Heavenly Kings, and at the back of his statue is a statue of Weituo. Statues of Four Heavenly Kings stand on the left and right sides.

=== Pilu Hall ===
The Pilu Hall (毗卢殿), also known as "Leiyin Baodian" (雷音宝殿), in the middle is Pilu Buddha (毗盧佛), the twelve Bodhisattva stand on the platform of gable wall. On the left, from back to front, they are statues of Miaode, Puyan, Mi Le, Weide Zizai, Jingzhu Yezhang and Yuanjue (妙德、普眼、弥勒、威德自在、净诸业障、圆觉六菩萨). On the right, from back to front, they are statues of Puxian, Jingangzang, Qingjinghui, Bianyin, Pujue and Xianshan (普贤、金刚藏、清净慧、辩音、普觉、贤善首六菩萨). A pair of Buddha's warrior stand on both sides of the gate.

=== Zhaobi ===
The Zhaobi (照壁) is built by stones and bricks. A Chinese poem is carved in the Zhaobi. It reads: "眼错不辨天花落，口说前朝事可凭，铁棒五郎曾护驾，铜台大显五台僧。"

=== Jietan Hall (Hall of Ordination Altar) ===
Jietan Hall (Hall of Ordination Altar), the most important hall in the temple, is the third hall of the temple. A large square ordination altar (戒坛) which is 5.1 metres (17 ft) long, 5 metres (16 ft) wide and 1.2 metres (3 ft 11 in) high and made of bluestone is placed in the middle of the hall. The present ordination altar was built in the Ming dynasty (1368-1644). A sitting statue of Shijiamouni which was brought from Burma in 1928 stands on the ordination altar. Both sides of the statue enshrine the Eighteen Arhats, they were made in the Shunzhi period (1644-1661) of Qing dynasty (1644-1912).

=== Zangjing Ge ===
The Zangjing Ge, or Tower of Buddhist Texts, is a two-story wooden structure. The sitting statue of Mi Le is placed with his head to the two-story.
