= East Asian hip-and-gable roof =

Type of roof in East Asian architecture

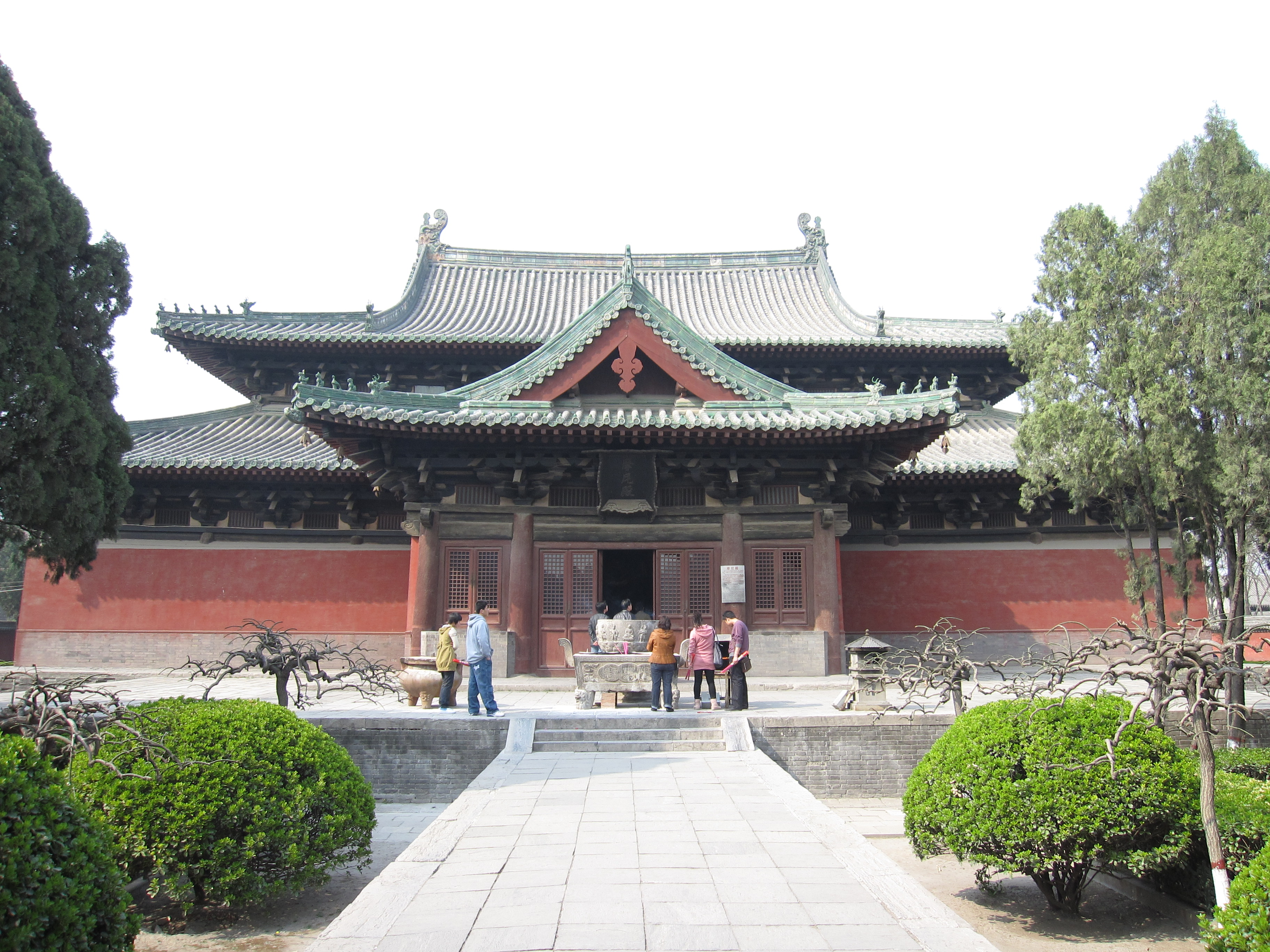
The Longxing Temple—built in 1052 and located at present-day Zhengding, Hebei Province, China—has a hip-and-gable xieshan-style roof with double eaves.

The East Asian hip-and-gable roof (Xiēshān (歇山) in Chinese, Paljakjibung (팔작지붕) in Korean and Irimoya (入母屋) in Japanese) also known as 'resting hill roof', consists of a hip roof that slopes down on all four sides and integrates a gable on two opposing sides. It is usually constructed with two large sloping roof sections in the front and back respectively, while each of the two sides is usually constructed with a smaller roof section.

The style is Chinese in origin, and has spread across much of East and Continental Asia. The original Chinese style and similar styles are not only found in the traditional architectures of Japan, Korea, and Vietnam but also other countries such as Mongolia, Buryatia, Kalmykia, Tuva, Bhutan, Tibet and Sri Lanka. A similar, generally taller and originally thatched hip and gable style is also traditionally used in Southeast Asia such as in the Philippines and in Indonesia.

== Etymology ==
It is known as xiēshān (歇山) in Chinese, paljakjibung (팔작지붕; 八作지붕) in Korean, and irimoya (入母屋) in Japanese.

== East Asia ==
=== Xieshan in China ===
In China, the hip-and-gable roof style, also known as the xieshan roof style, is thought to be invented by Huang Jieming, a Chinese inventor from the Eastern Han dynasty, as an adaptation of the hip roof. It was mainly applied in the construction of palaces, temples, gardens and other buildings with official functions. In contemporary times, it is still widely used in Buddhist and Taoist temples and shrines in China.

The style is generally characterized by the presence of nine ridges and a hipped roof encircled with a peristyle. The nine ridges typically consists of one horizontal ridge on the top, known as the main ridge, which is connected to four vertical ridges and four diagonal ridges.

There are typically two types of eaves associated with the xieshan style: single eaves (单檐) and double eaves (重檐). Single eaves refer to the edges of a basic xieshan rooftop, while double eaves consist of an additional layer of eaves below the basic xieshan rooftop. Examples of the double eave type can be found on the xieshan roofs of structures such as Cining Palace, the Gate of Supreme Harmony and the Hall of Preserving Harmony in the Forbidden City, as well as the Grand Hotel in Taipei. Examples of the single eave type can be found on buildings such as Zhihua Temple, the shanmen of Miaoying Temple, and the North Gate of the Walls of Taipei.

=== Paljakjibung in Korea ===
Paljakjibung (팔작지붕) is the most commonly used roof type in authoritative architecture during the Joseon Dynasty. Considering that the hierarchy is the highest, regardless of size, most of the central buildings are Paljak. However, in temple architecture in the late Joseon Dynasty, where wood was scarce due to the high demand for wood used for roof furniture, the lower furniture was left intact and only the roof was often replaced by the eight-piece.

=== Irimoya in Japan ===
Irimoya arrived from China to Japan in the 6th century. The style was originally used in the main and lecture halls of a Buddhist temple compound. It started to be used for the honden at shrines and also in palaces, castles, and folk dwellings later during the Japanese Middle Ages. Its gable is usually right above the moya, or core, while the hip covers the hisashi, a veranda-like aisle surrounding the core on one or more sides.

It is still in wide use in the construction of Buddhist temples and Shinto shrines in Japan. It is also often called moya-zukuri (母屋造). Another variant of Japanese hip-and-gable roof is the Shikorobuki.

== South Asia ==
=== Kandyan roof of Sri Lanka ===
In Sri Lanka, a style known as the kandyan roof bears many similarities to the original East Asian hip-and-gable roof. The kandyan roof is primarily used for religious, and historically, royal buildings. Its roots however lie in the traditions of the "Sri Lankan village".

== Gallery ==
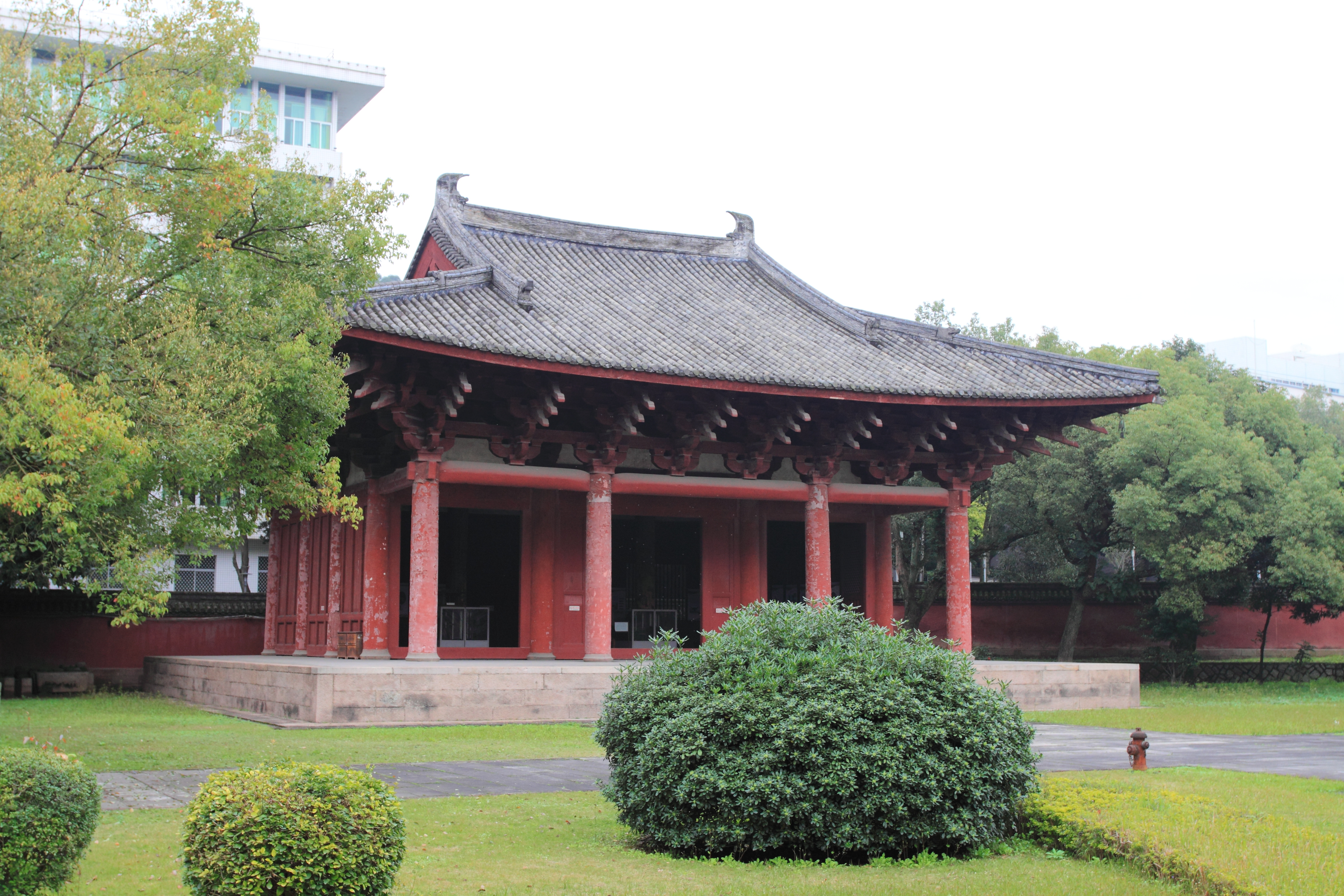
Xieshan roof with single eaves on Hualin Temple in Fujian, China

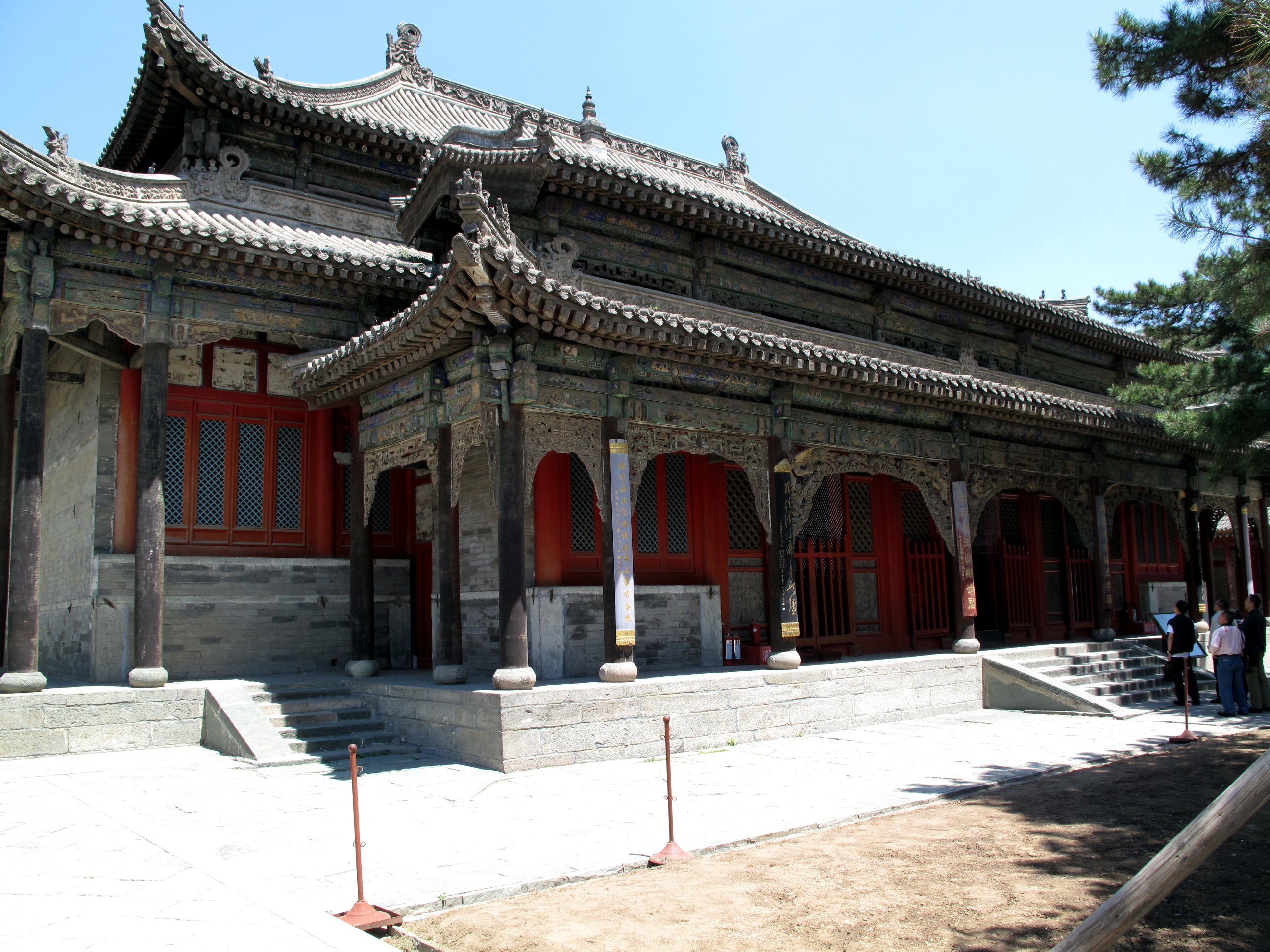
Xieshan roof with multiple eaves on the Mahavira Hall of Xiantong Temple on Mount Wutai, Wutai County, Shanxi, China

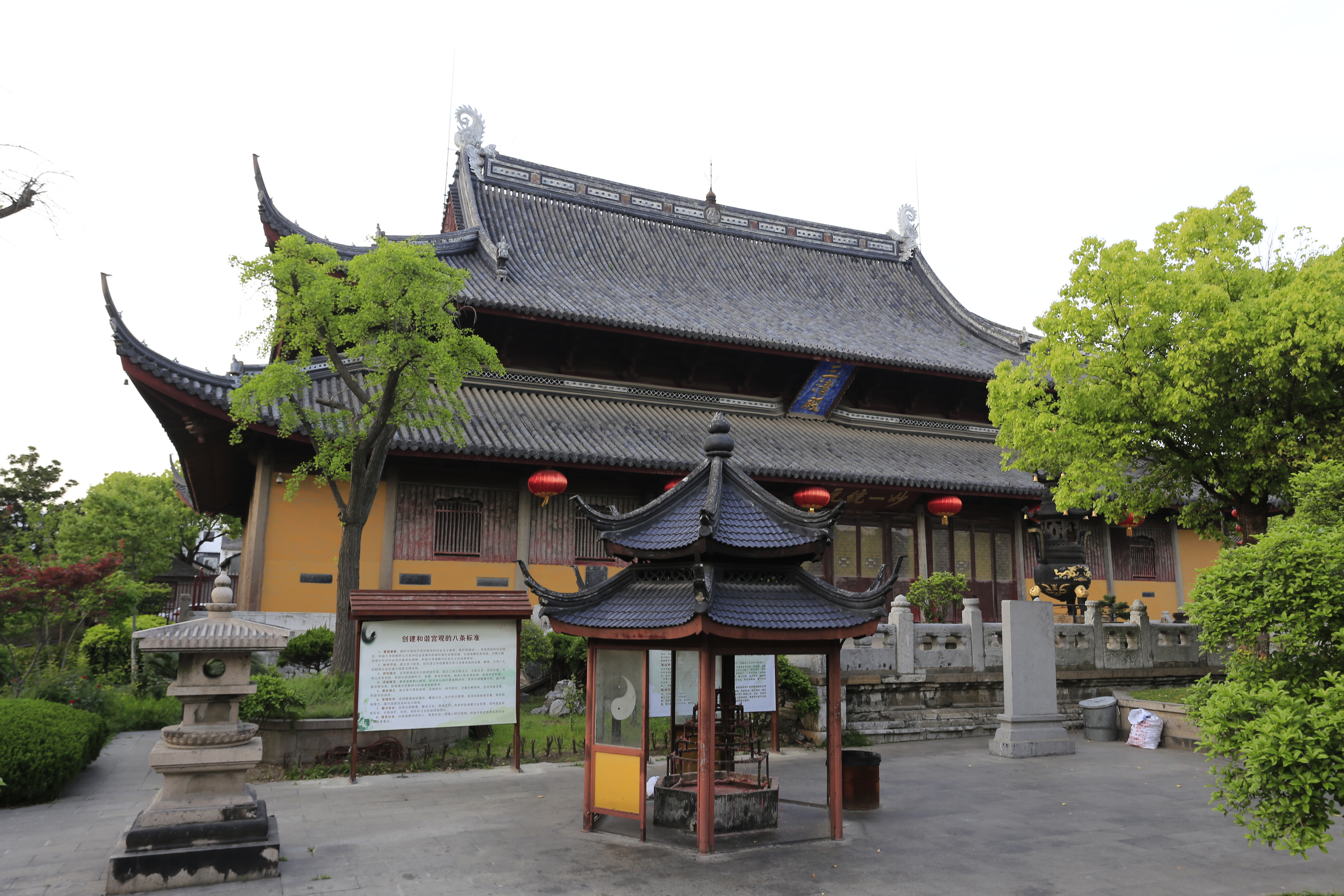
Xieshan roof with single eaves on the Hall of the Three Pure Ones in Xuanmiao Temple in Suzhou, Jiangsu, China

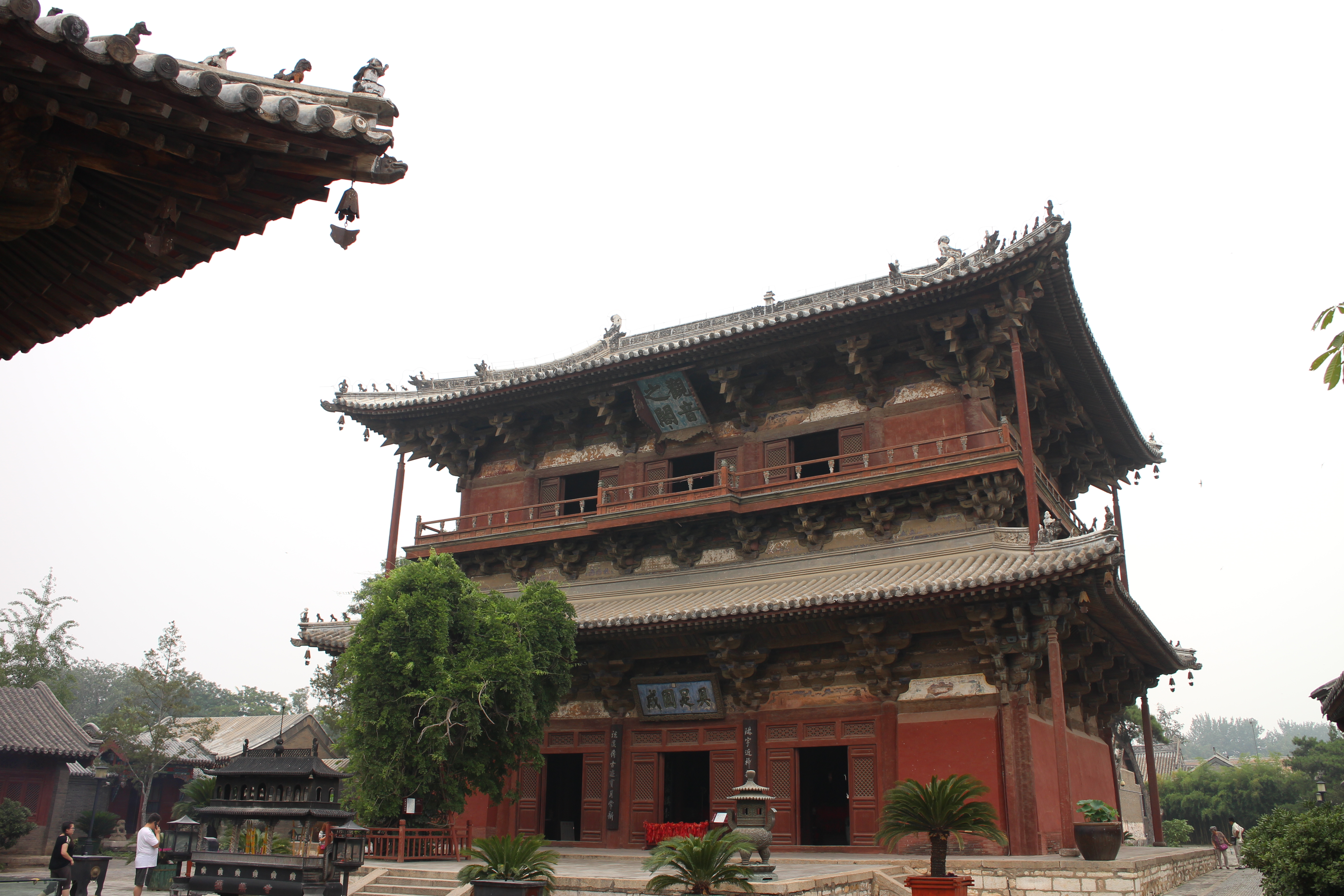
Xieshan roof with double eaves on the Guanyin Pavilion in Dule Temple in Tianjin, China

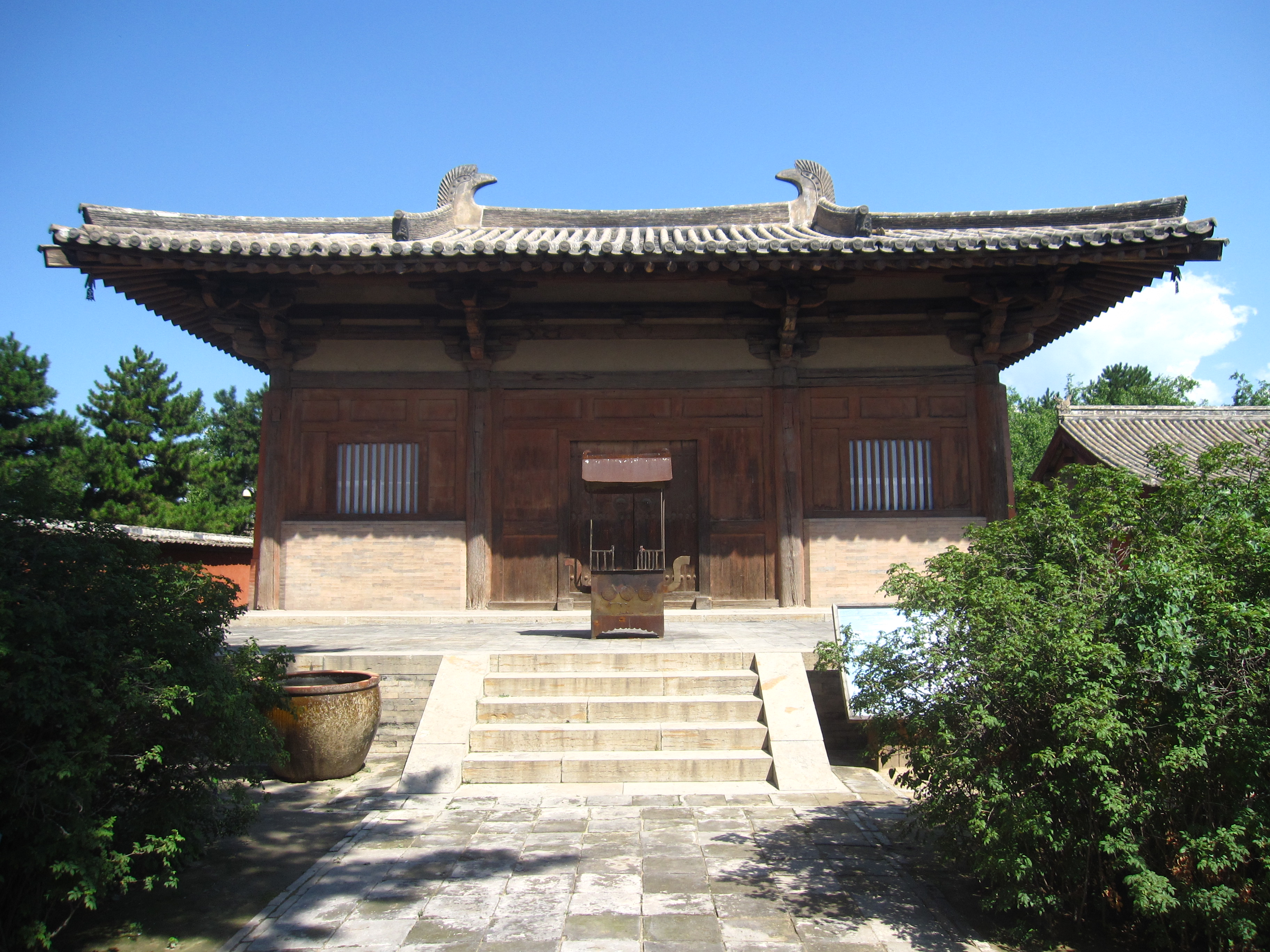
The Great Buddha Hall in Nanchan Temple on Mount Wutai, Wutai County, Shanxi, China, dating back to the Tang dynasty (618–907) and exhibiting a Xieshan roof; this is China's oldest existing timber building.

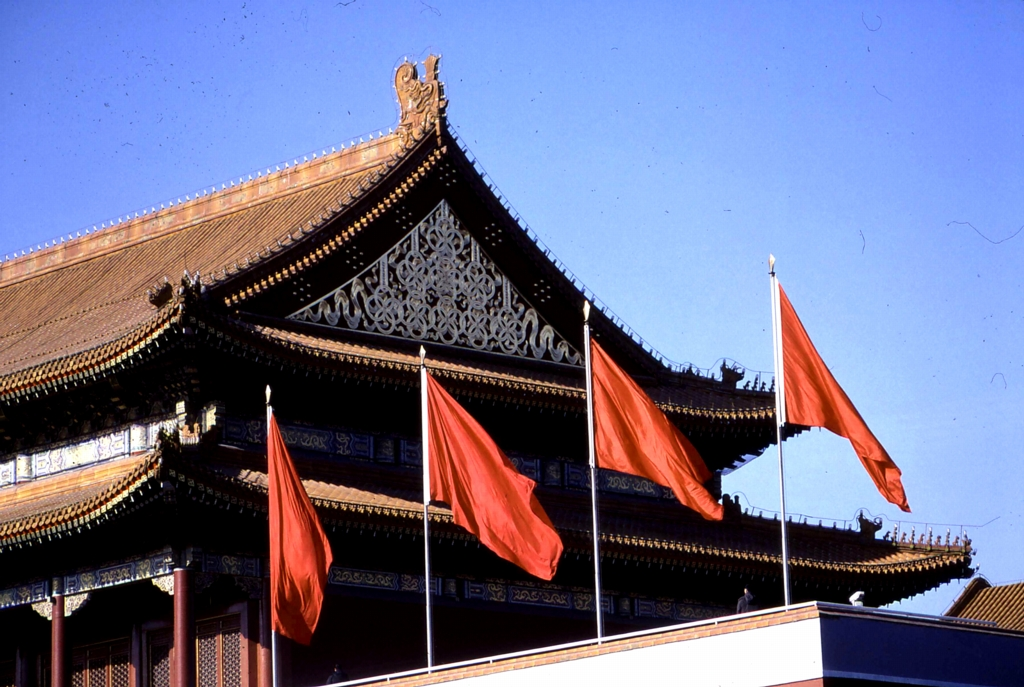
A hip-and-gable is seen in the Tiananmen, Beijing.

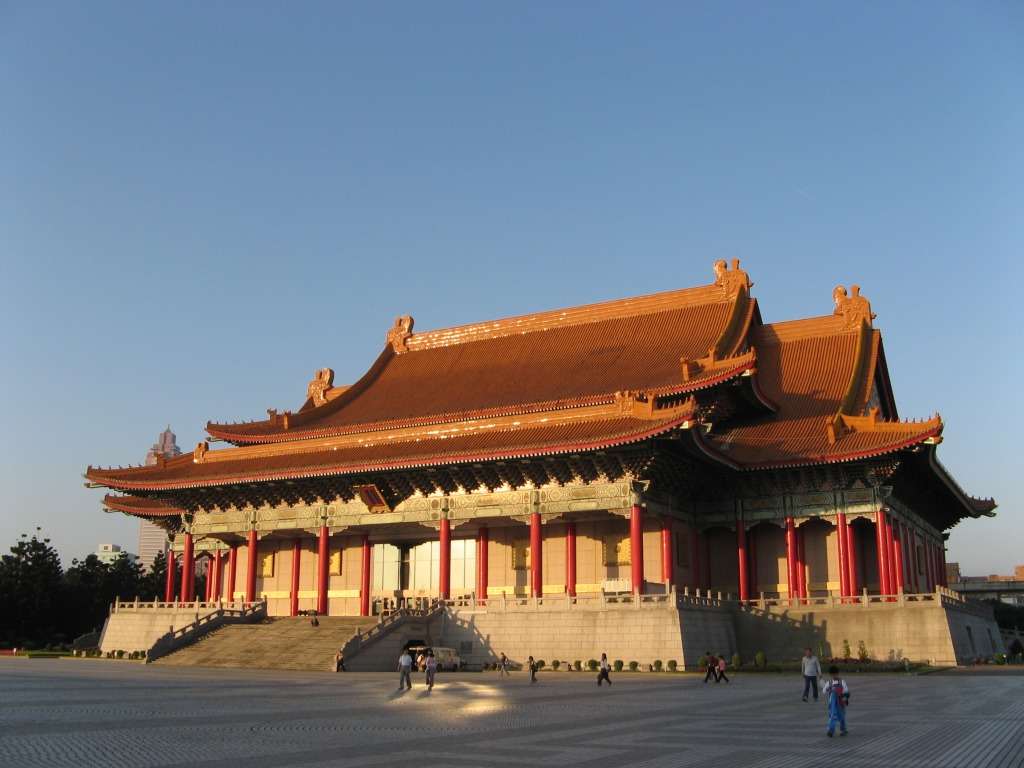
National Concert Hall in Taipei, Taiwan

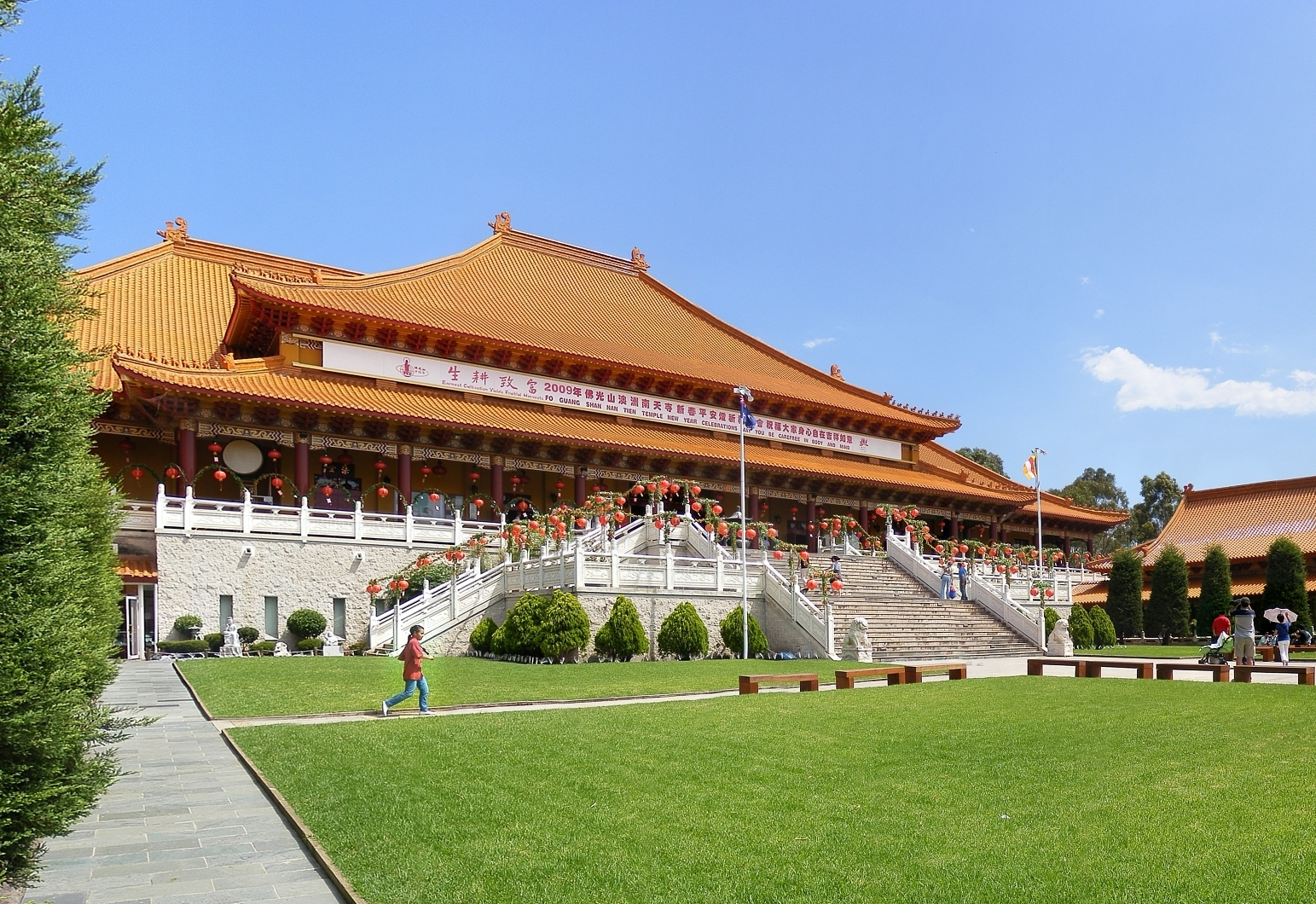
Nan Tien Temple in Wollongong, New South Wales, Australia

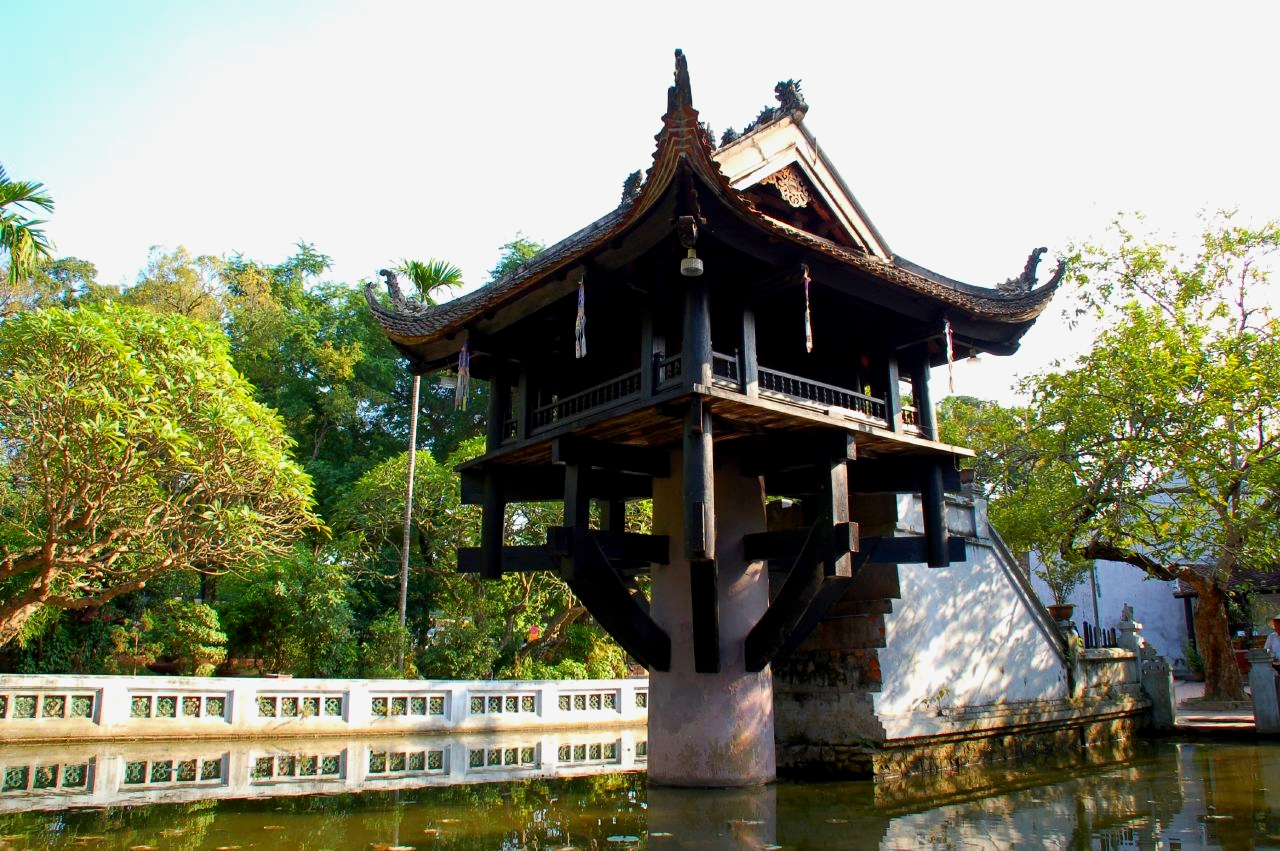
One Pillar Pagoda in Hanoi, Vietnam

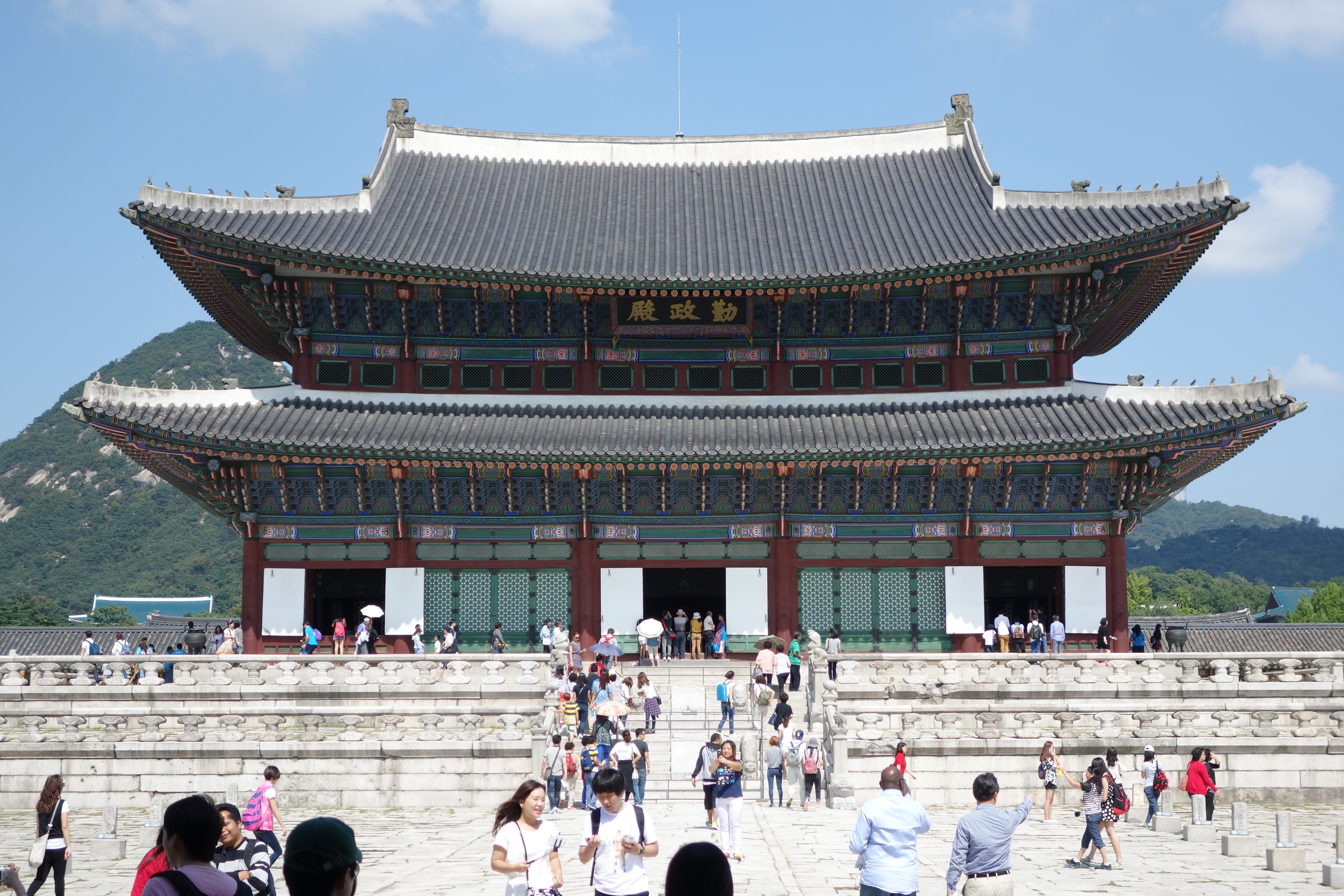
Gyeongbokgung (근정전) Hall of Gyeongbokgung Palace, Seoul, South Korea

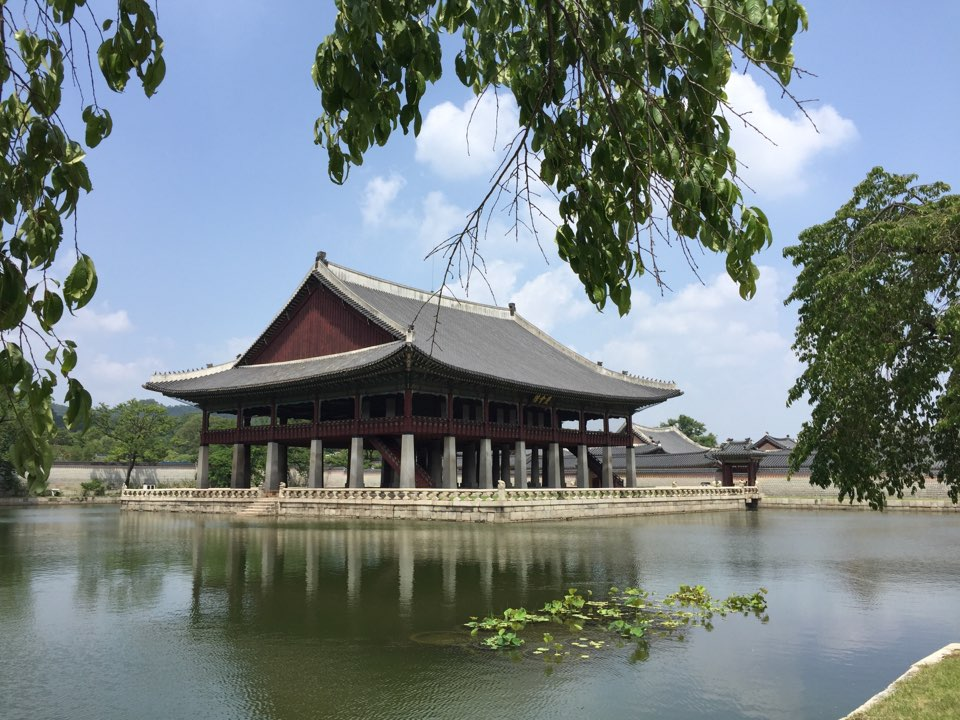
Gyeonghoeru (경희루) Pavilion of Gyeongbokgung Palace, Seoul, South Korea

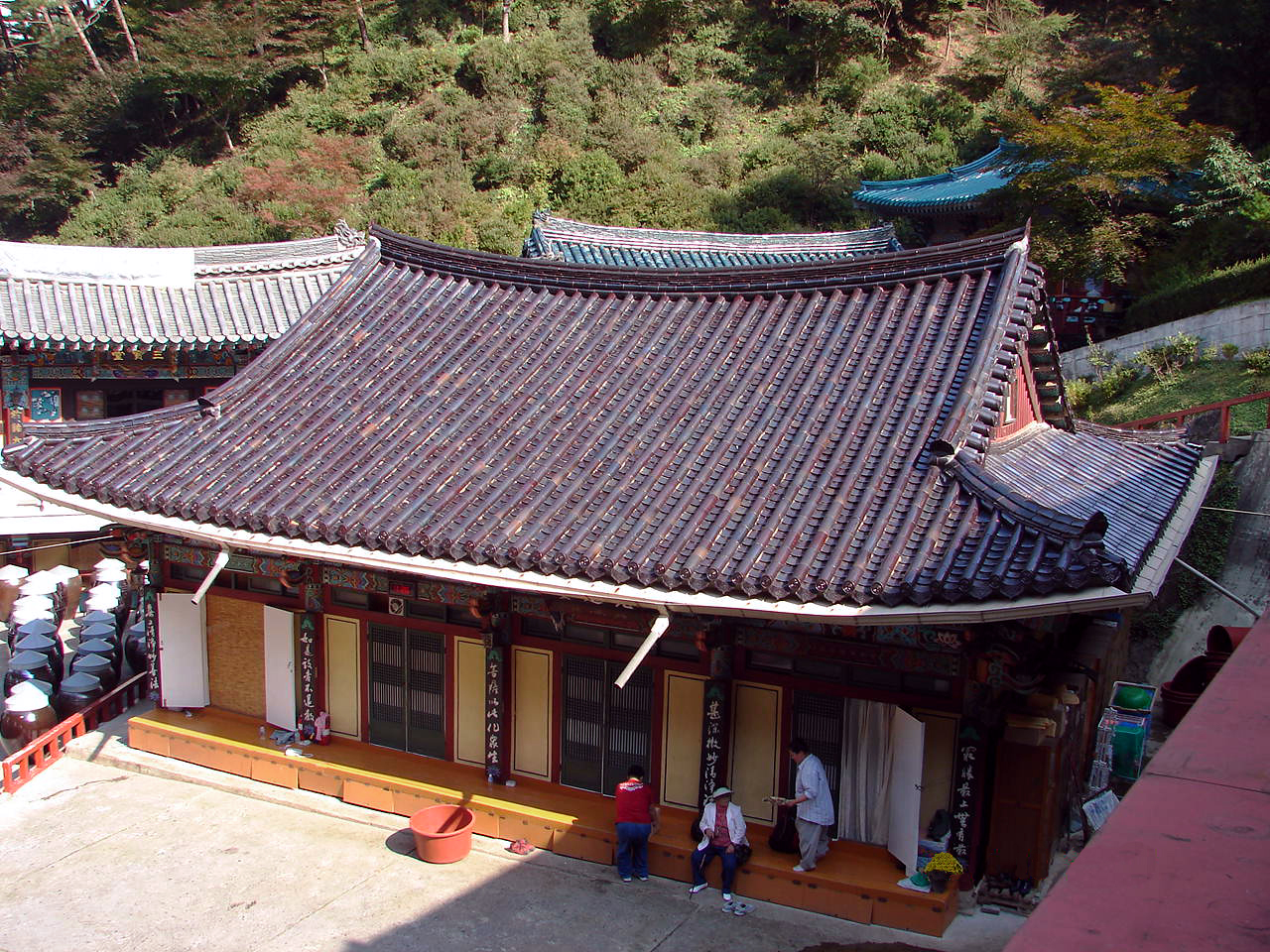
Guinsa Hall with Maroon Glazed Roof Tiles (Chungcheongbuk-do, South Korea).

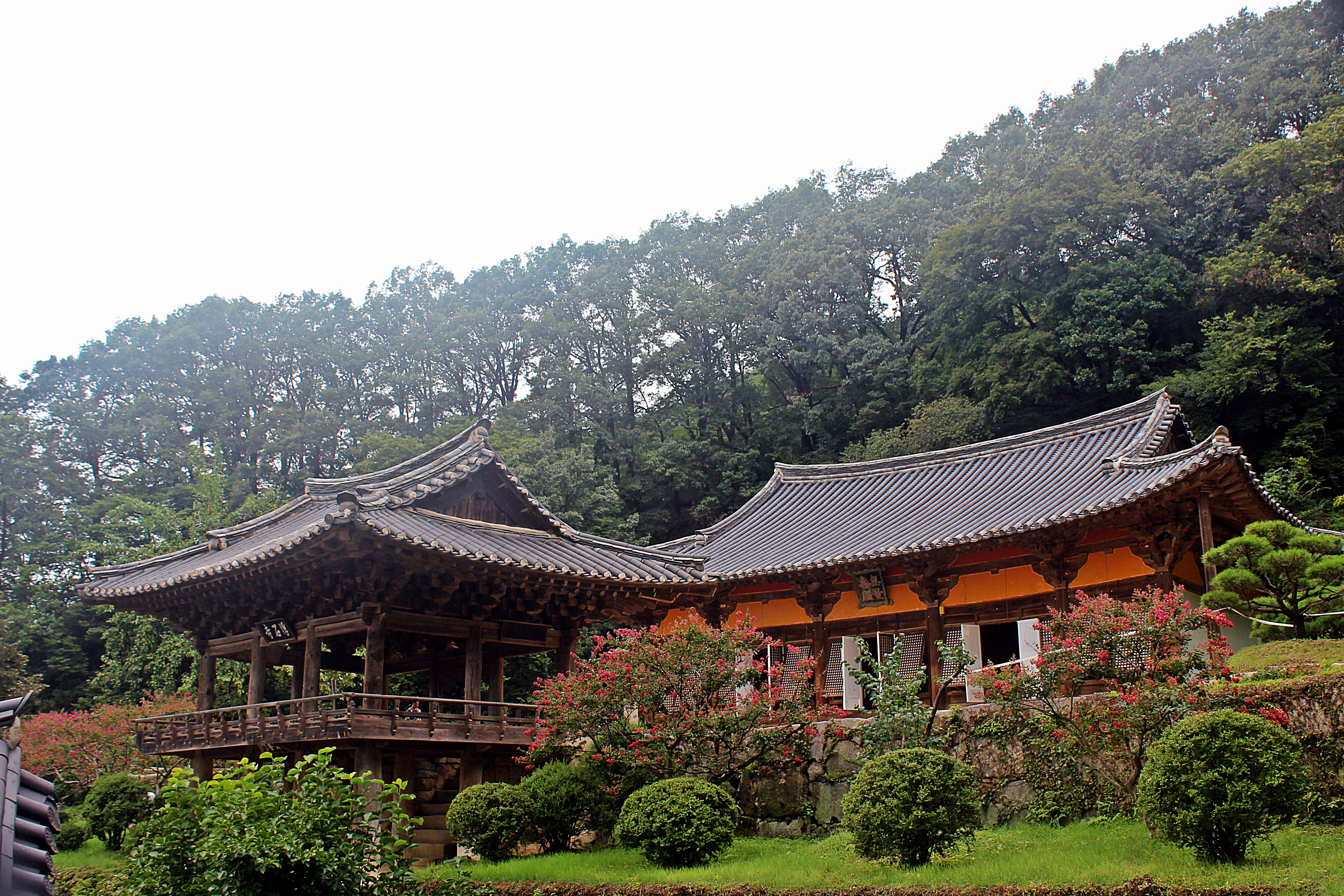
Anyangnu (안양루) and Muryangsujeon Hall of Buseoksa Temple (부석사 무량수전), Yeongju, North Gyeongsang Province, South Korea

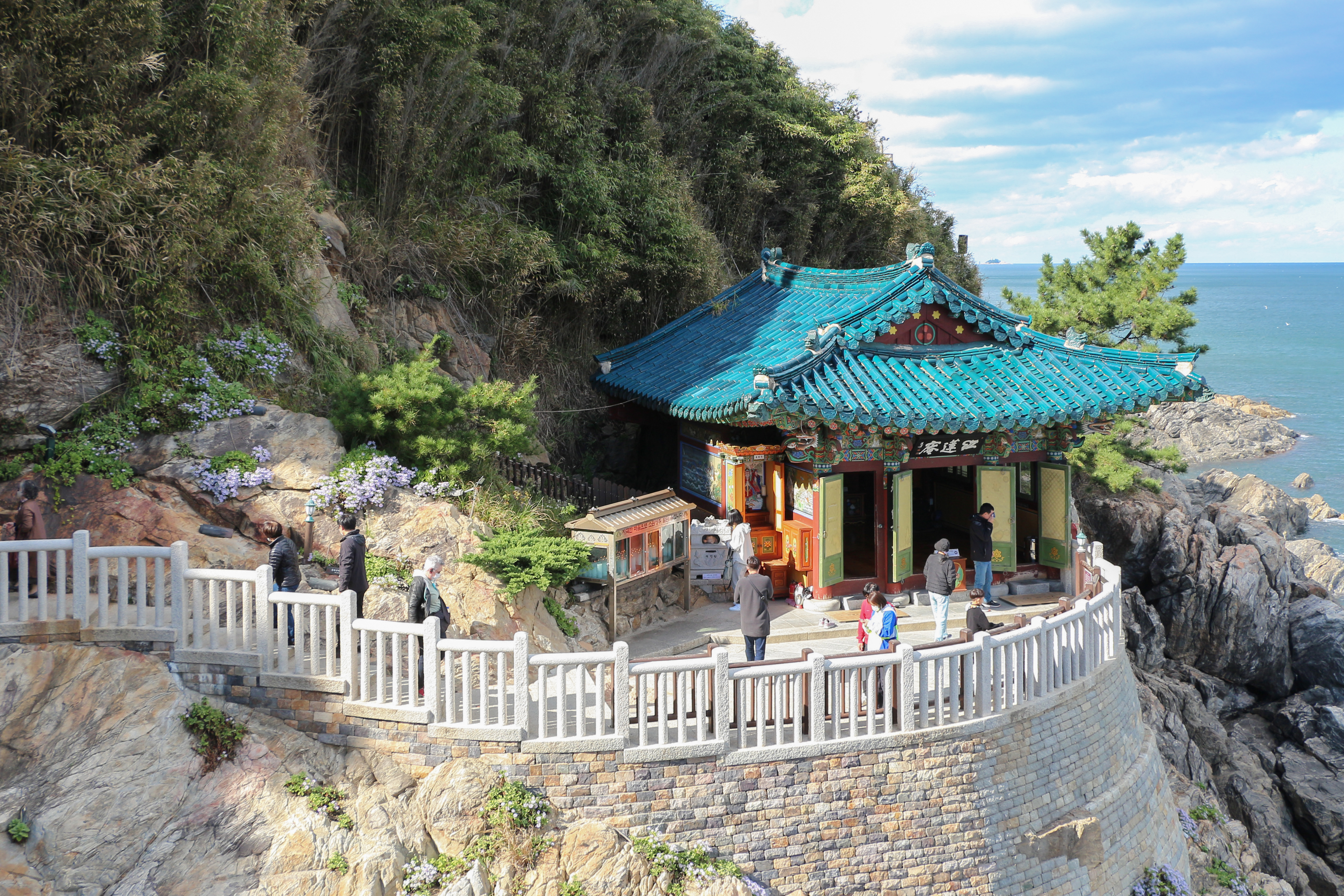
Hongryeonam (홍련암) at Naksansa, Yangyang, Gangwon Province, South Korea, 676

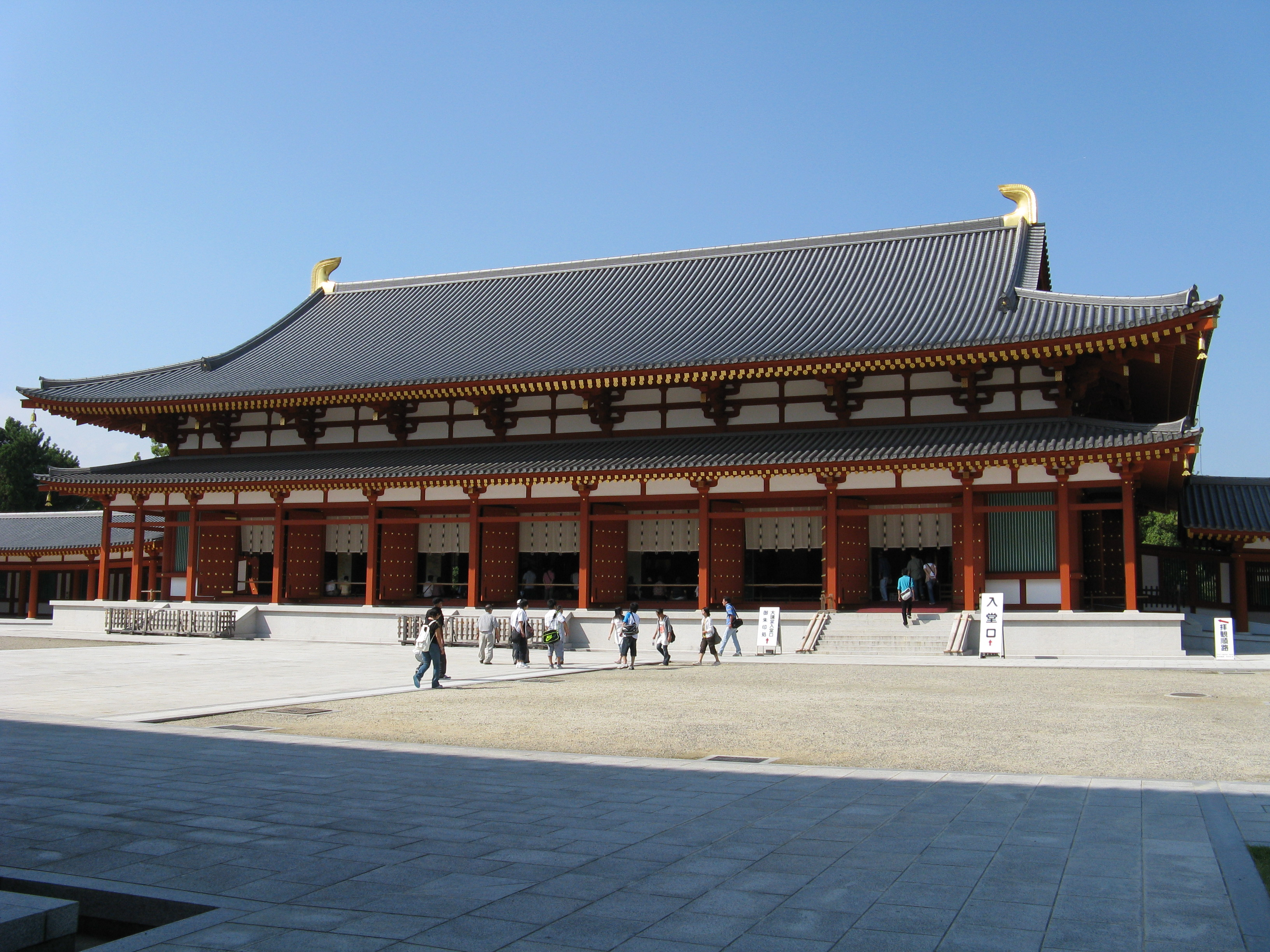
Yakushi-ji's (Dai)kō-dō

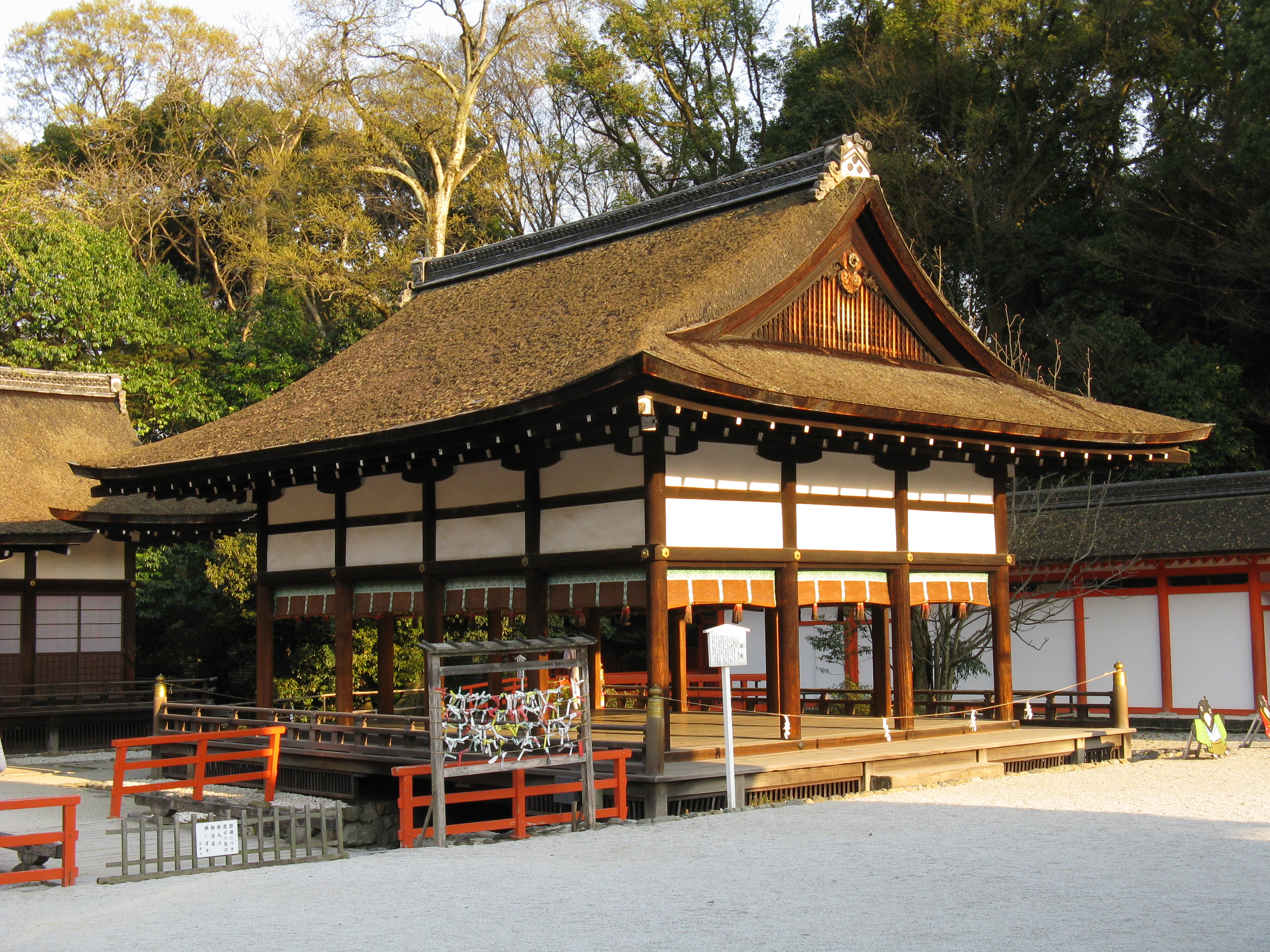
A hip-and-gable roof at Shimogamo Shrine

A shikoro-yane

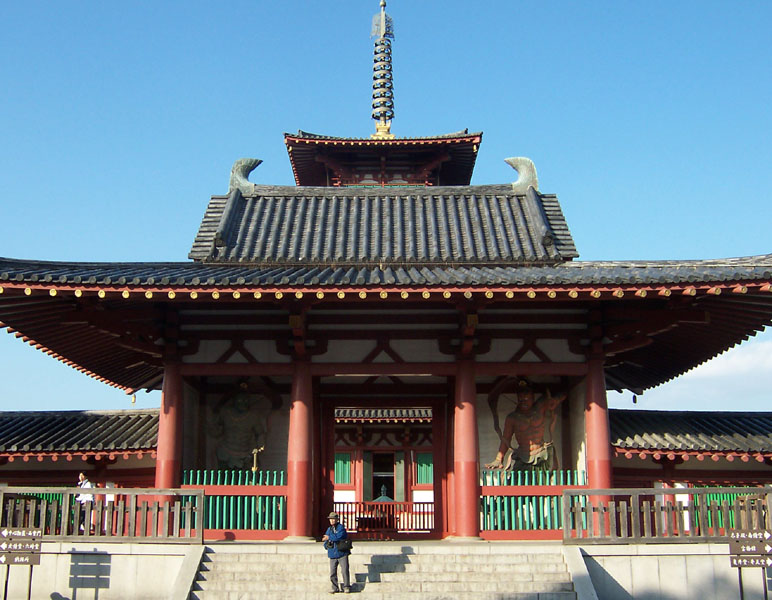
Shitennō-ji main gate and its shikoro-yane

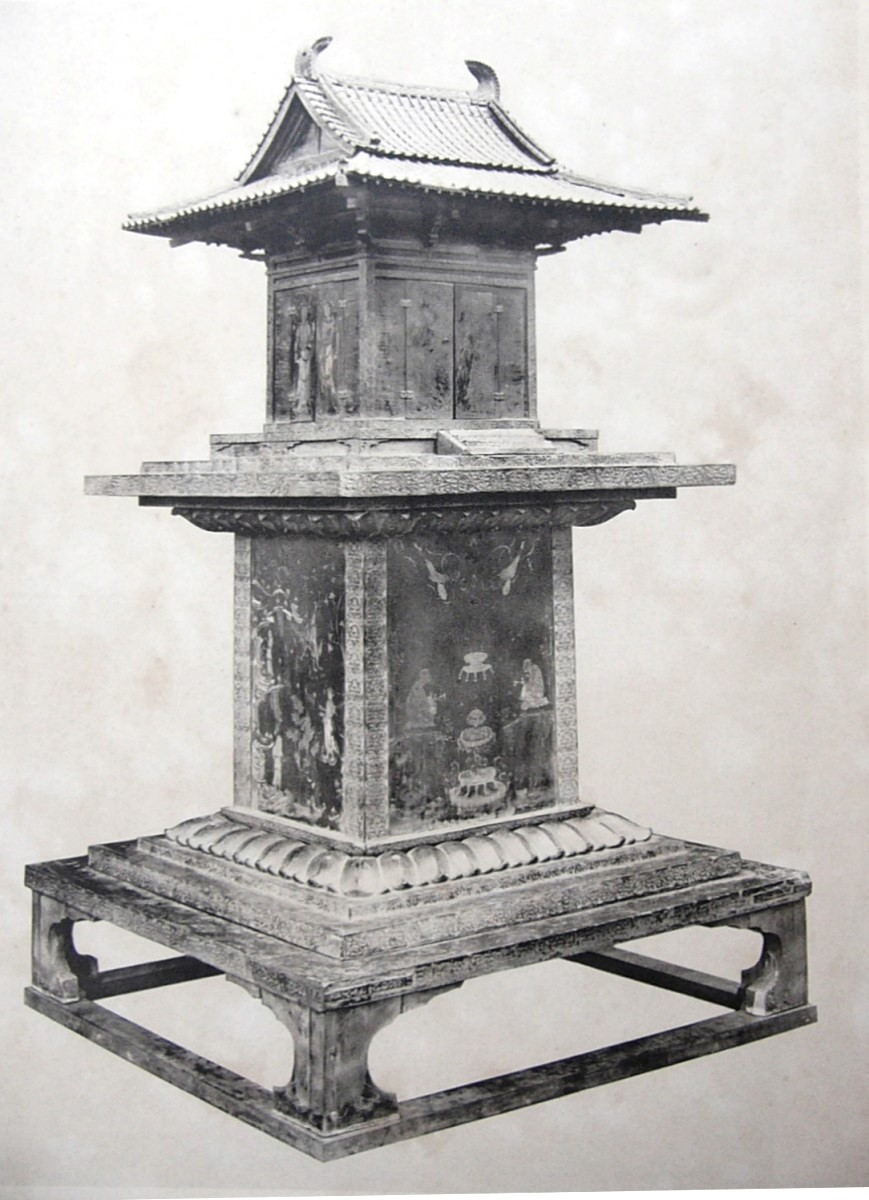
The Tamamushi Shrine has a shikoro-yane.

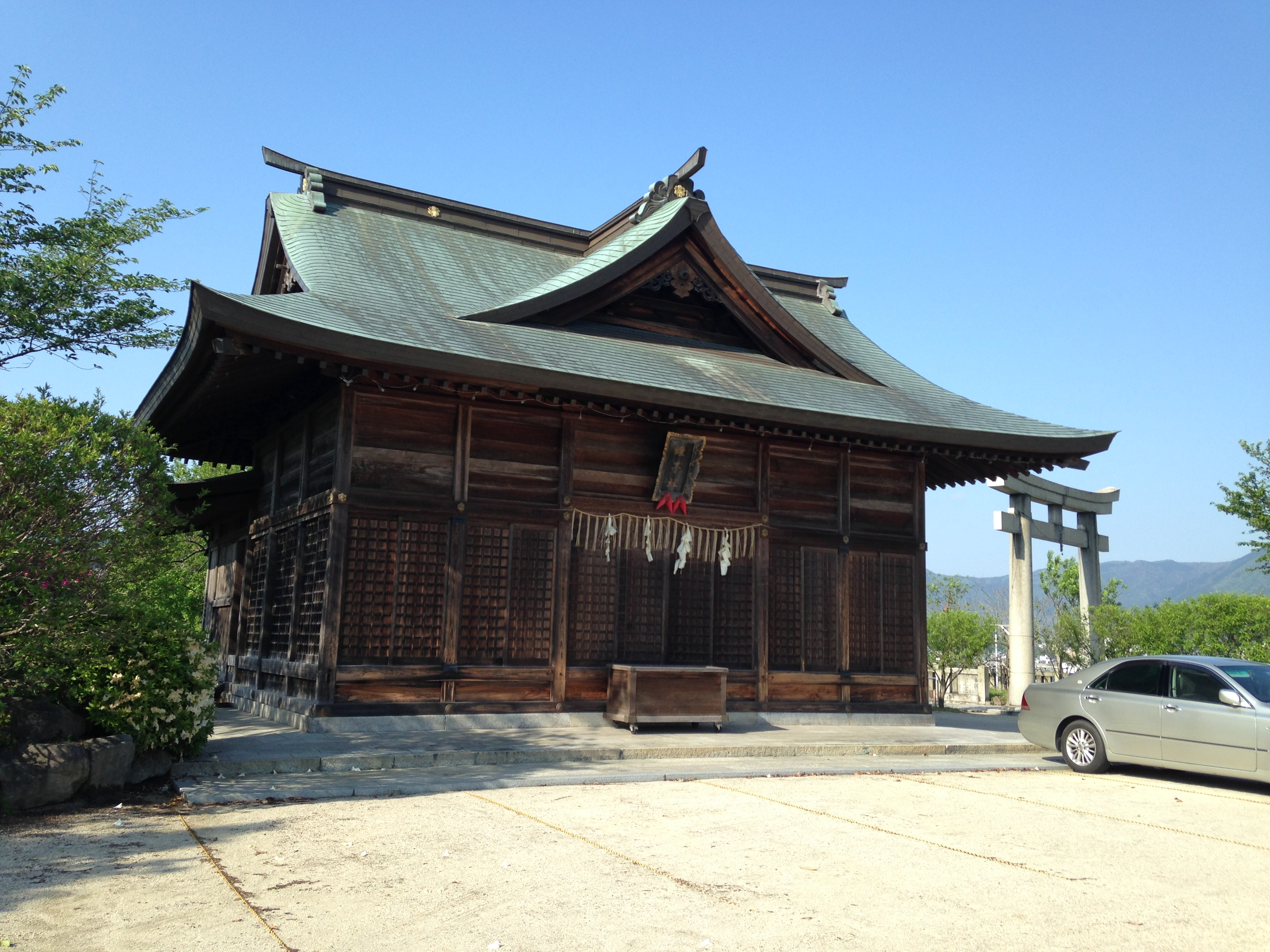
A haiden of Shinto shrine in East Asian Hip-and-Gable roof style architecture

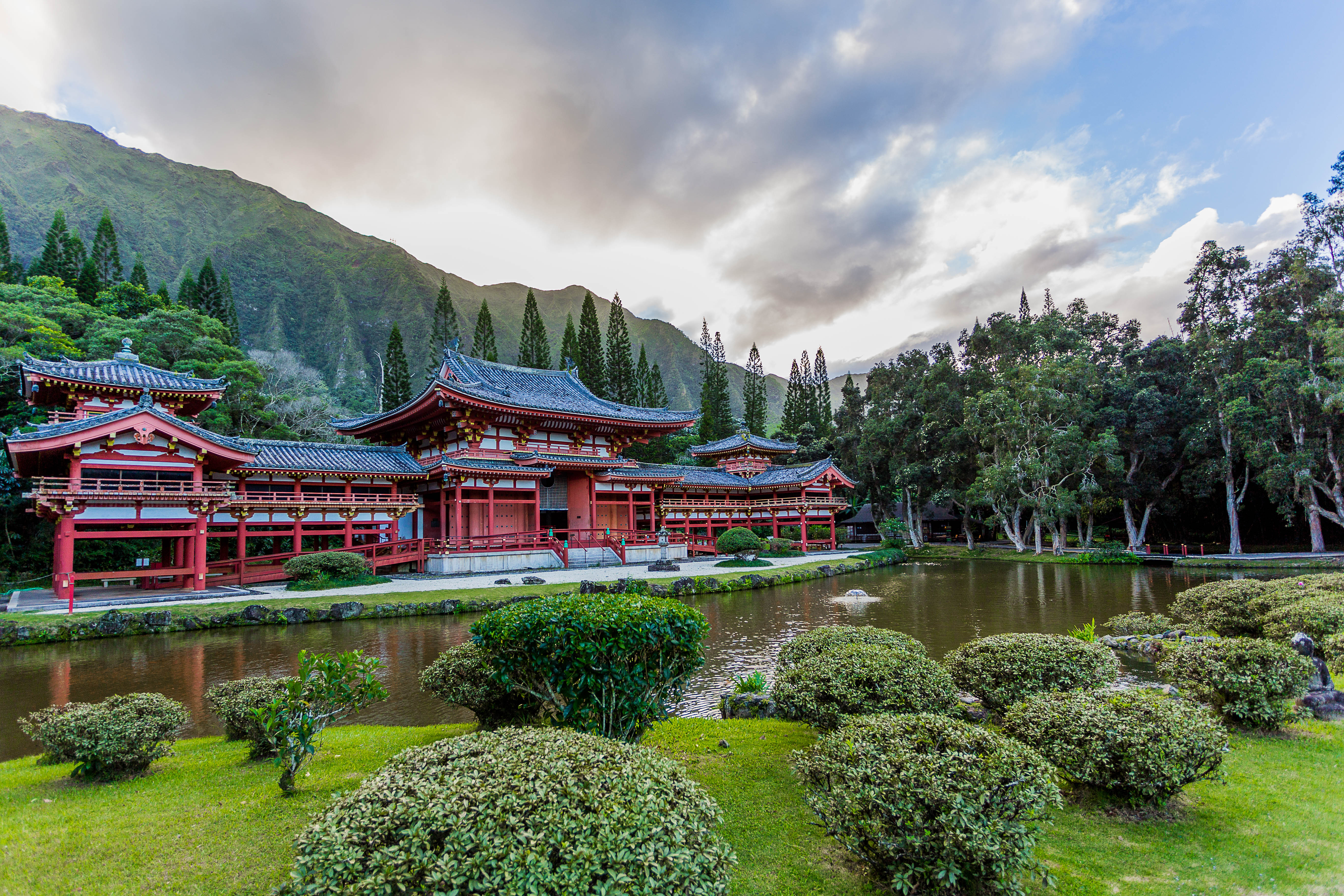
The Byodo-In Temple on Oahu island in Hawaii, United States

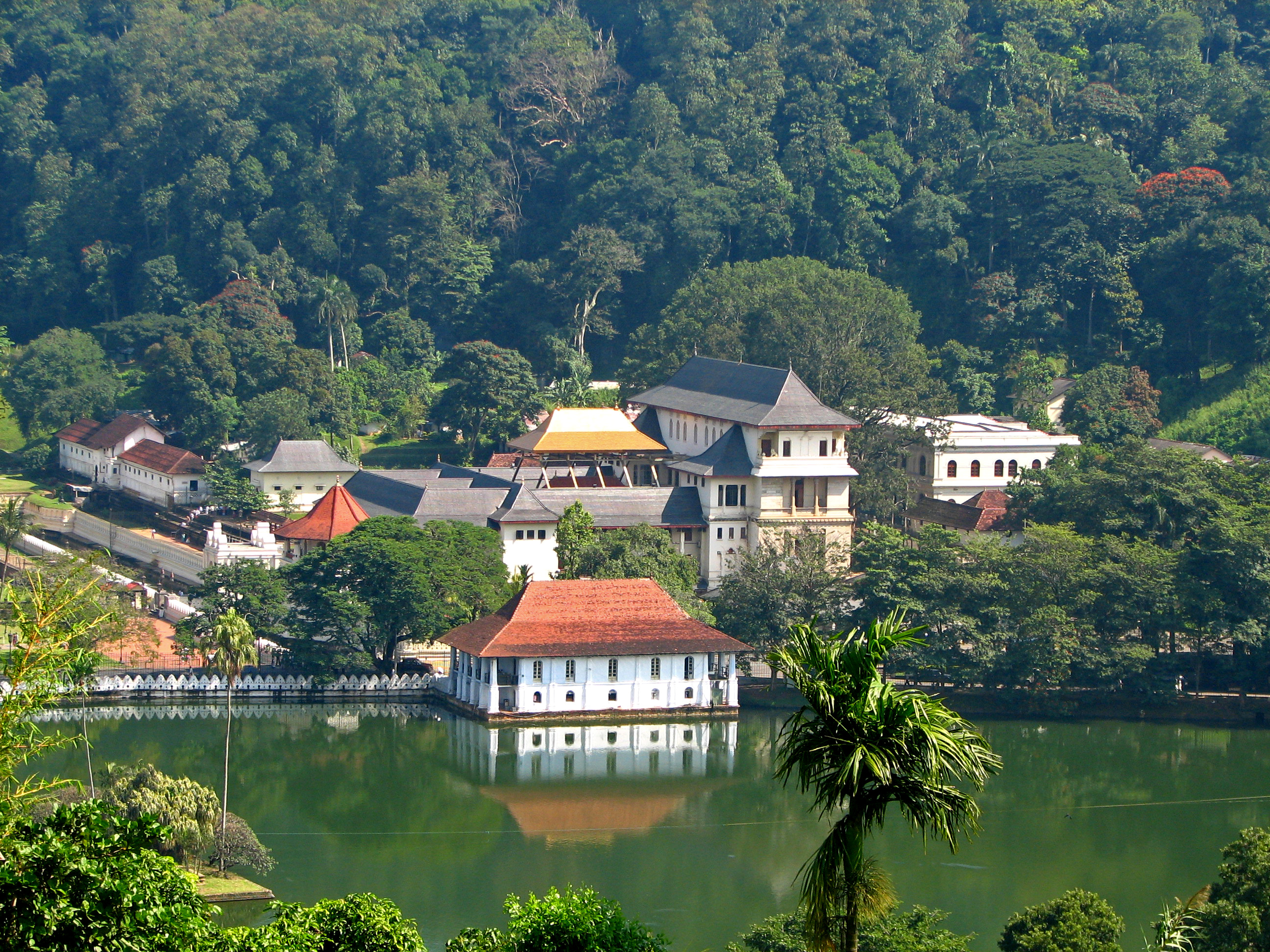
The Kandyan roof style of the Temple of the Tooth in Kandy, Sri Lanka

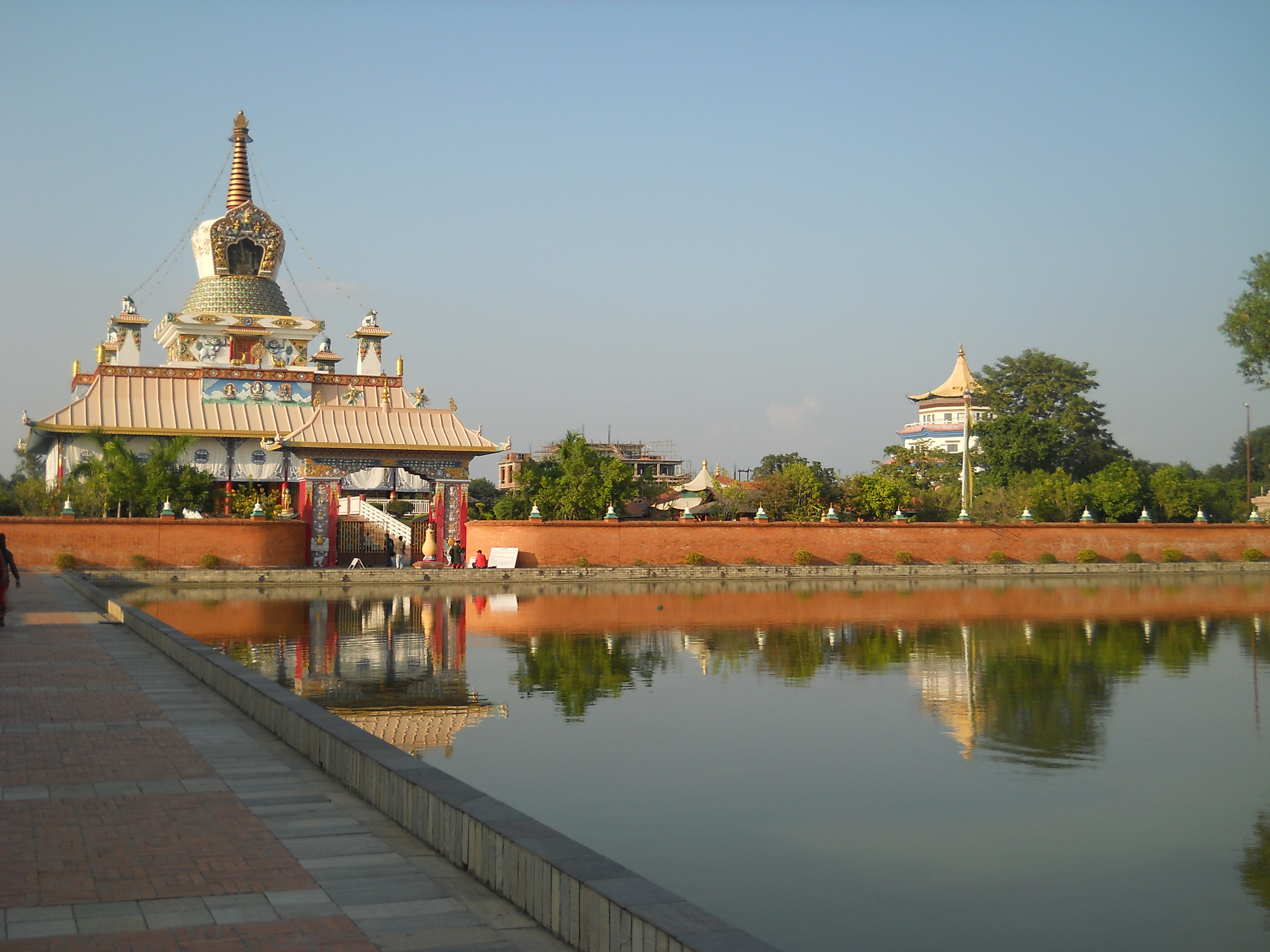
The Great Drigung Kagyud Lotus Stupa in Lumbini, Nepal

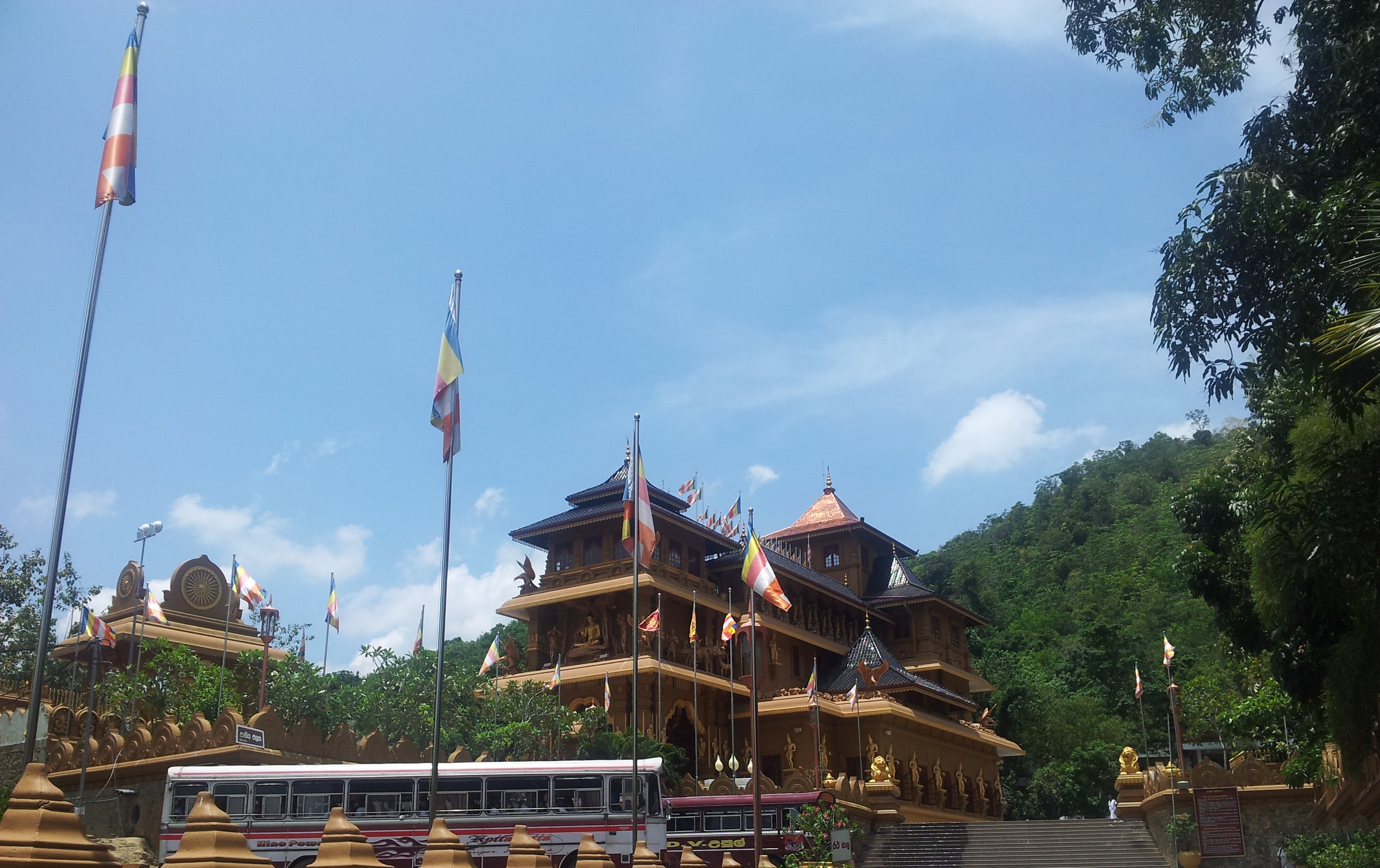
The Mahamevnawa Buddhist Monastery in Polgahawela, Sri Lanka

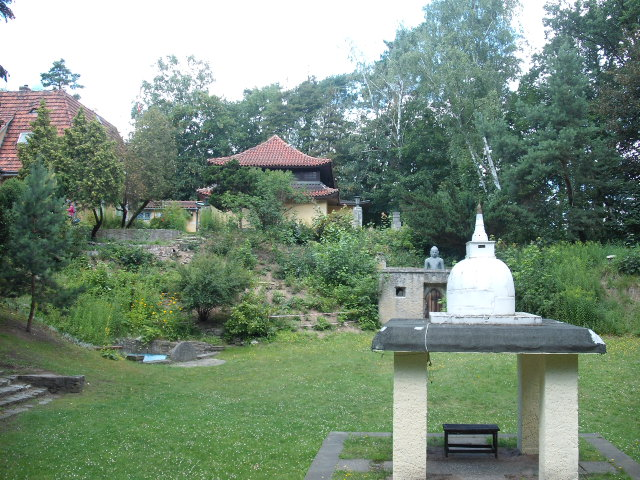
Das Buddhistische Haus in Berlin

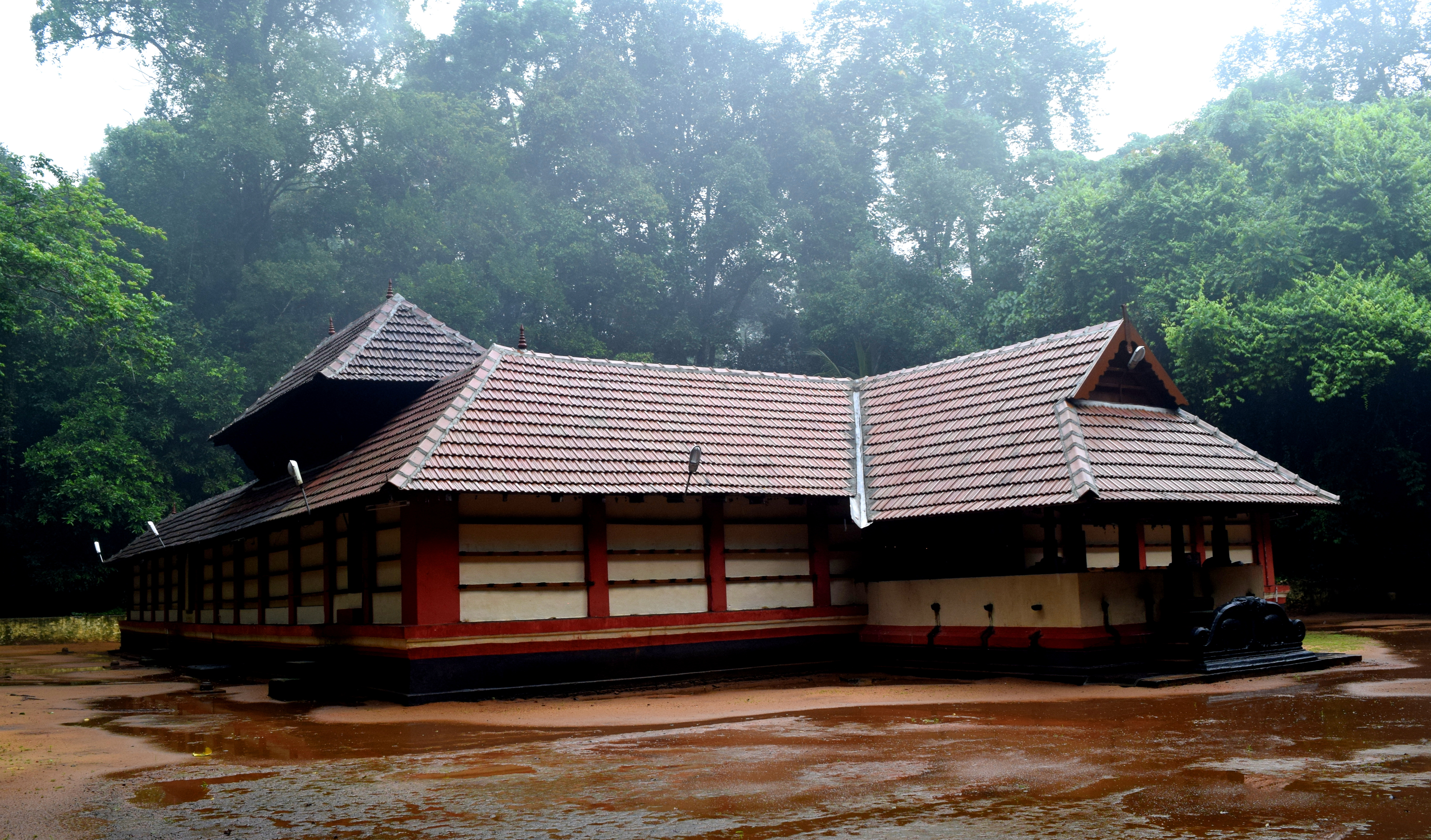
Iringol Kavu Temple, Kerala, India

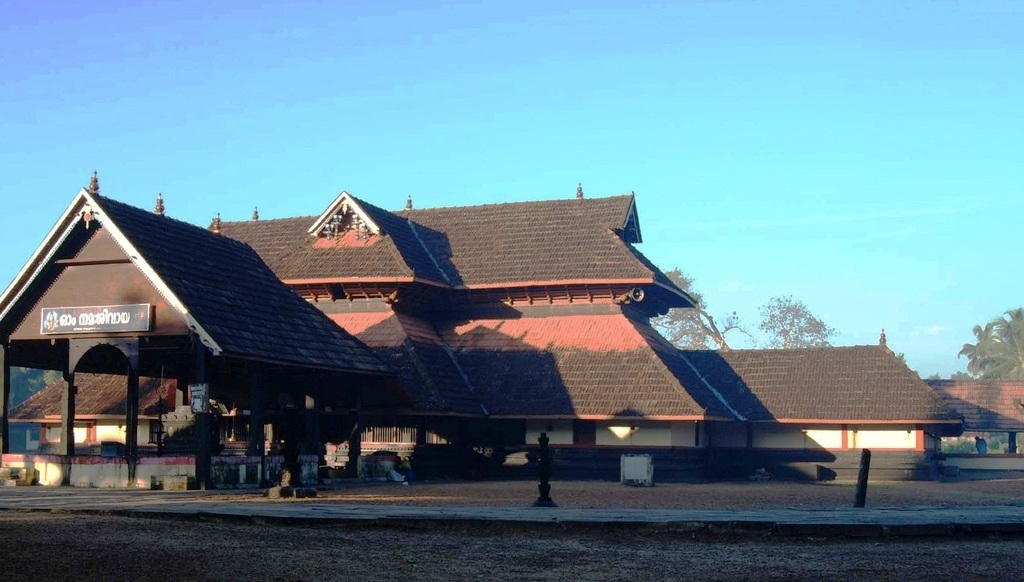
Mannar Thrikkuratti Mahadeva Temple, Kerala, India

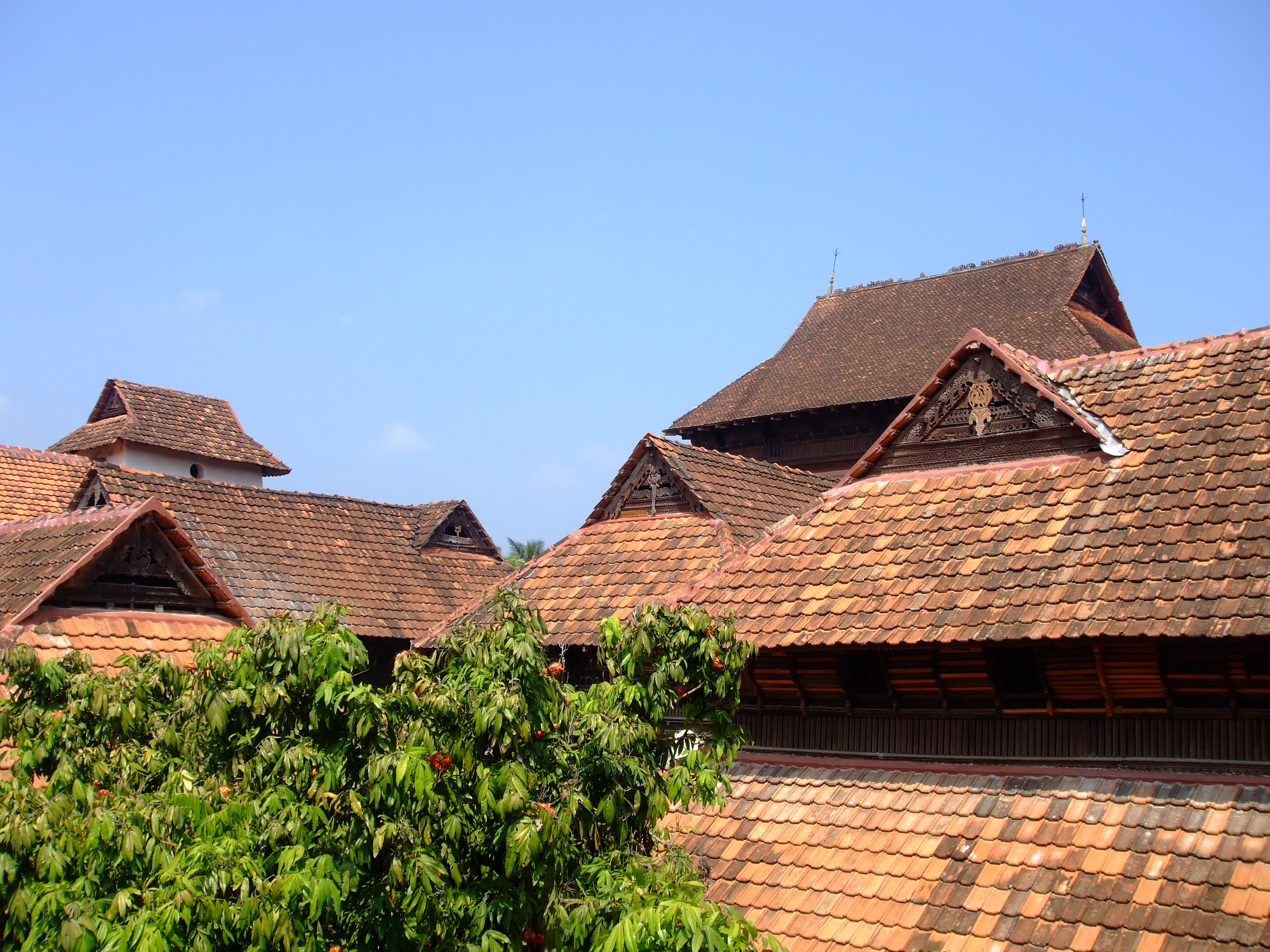
Padmanabhapuram Palace, Kerala, India

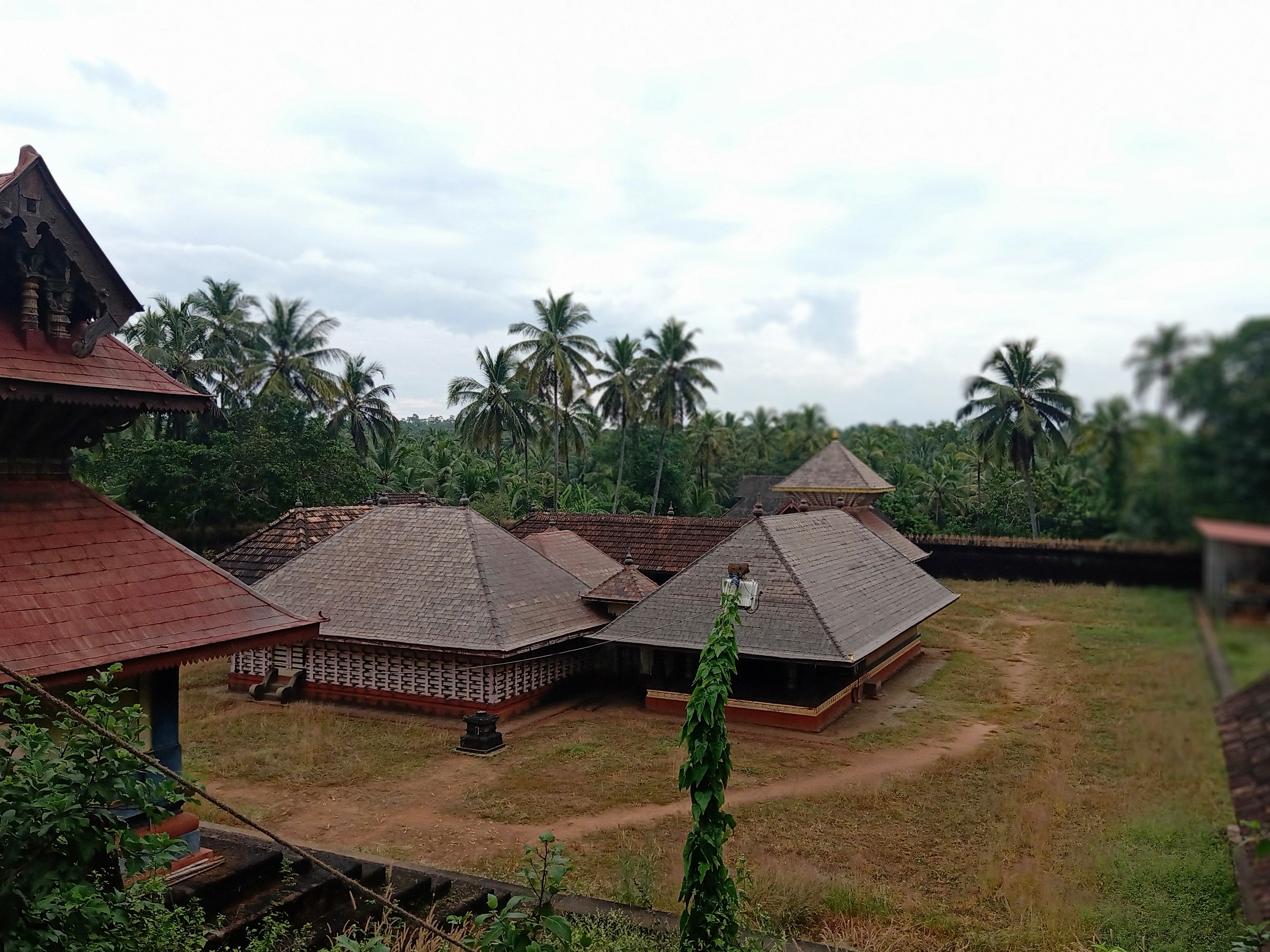
Sree Madiyan Koolom Kshethrapalaka Temple, Kerala, India

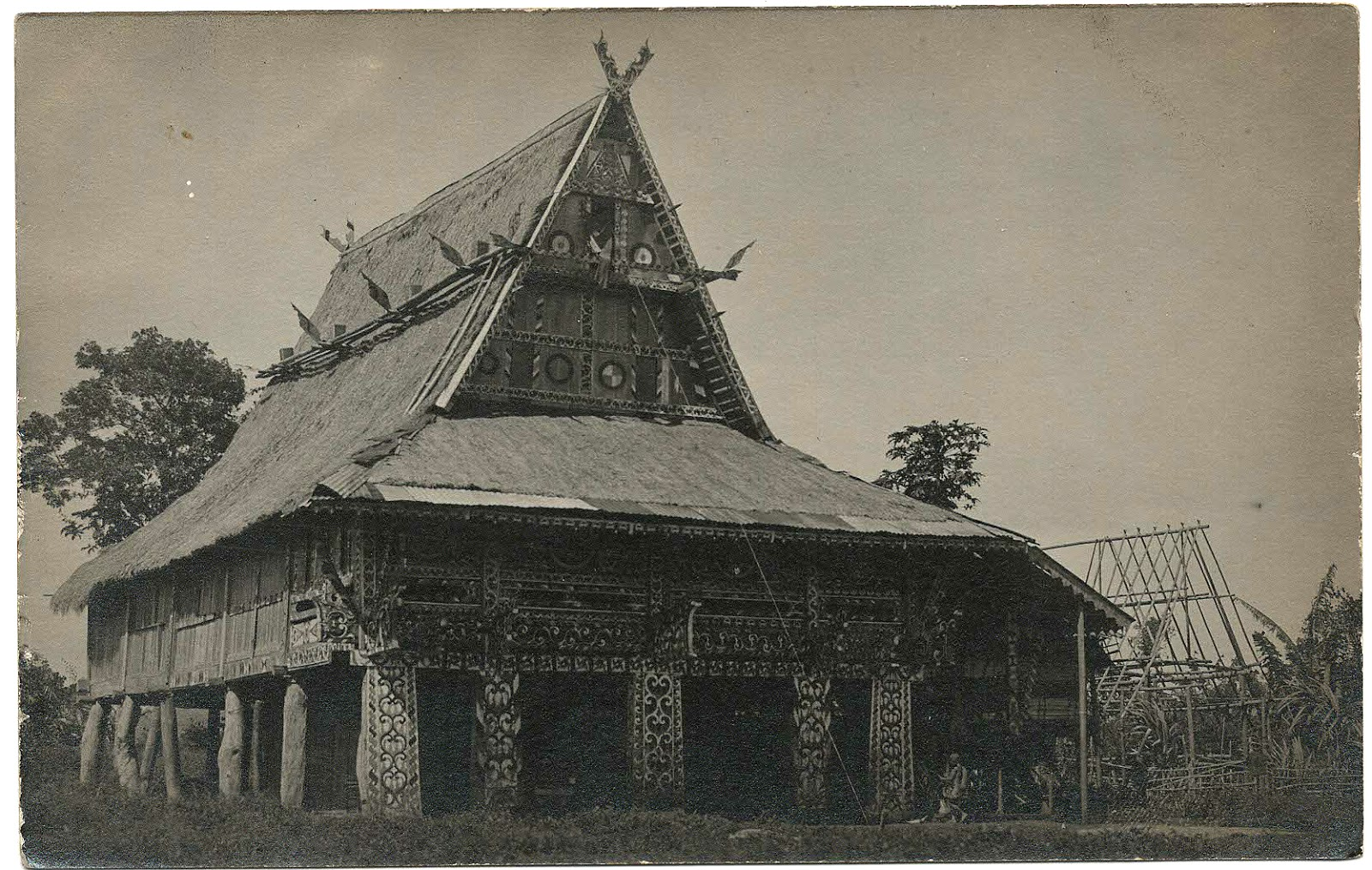
A Maranao torogan from the Philippines

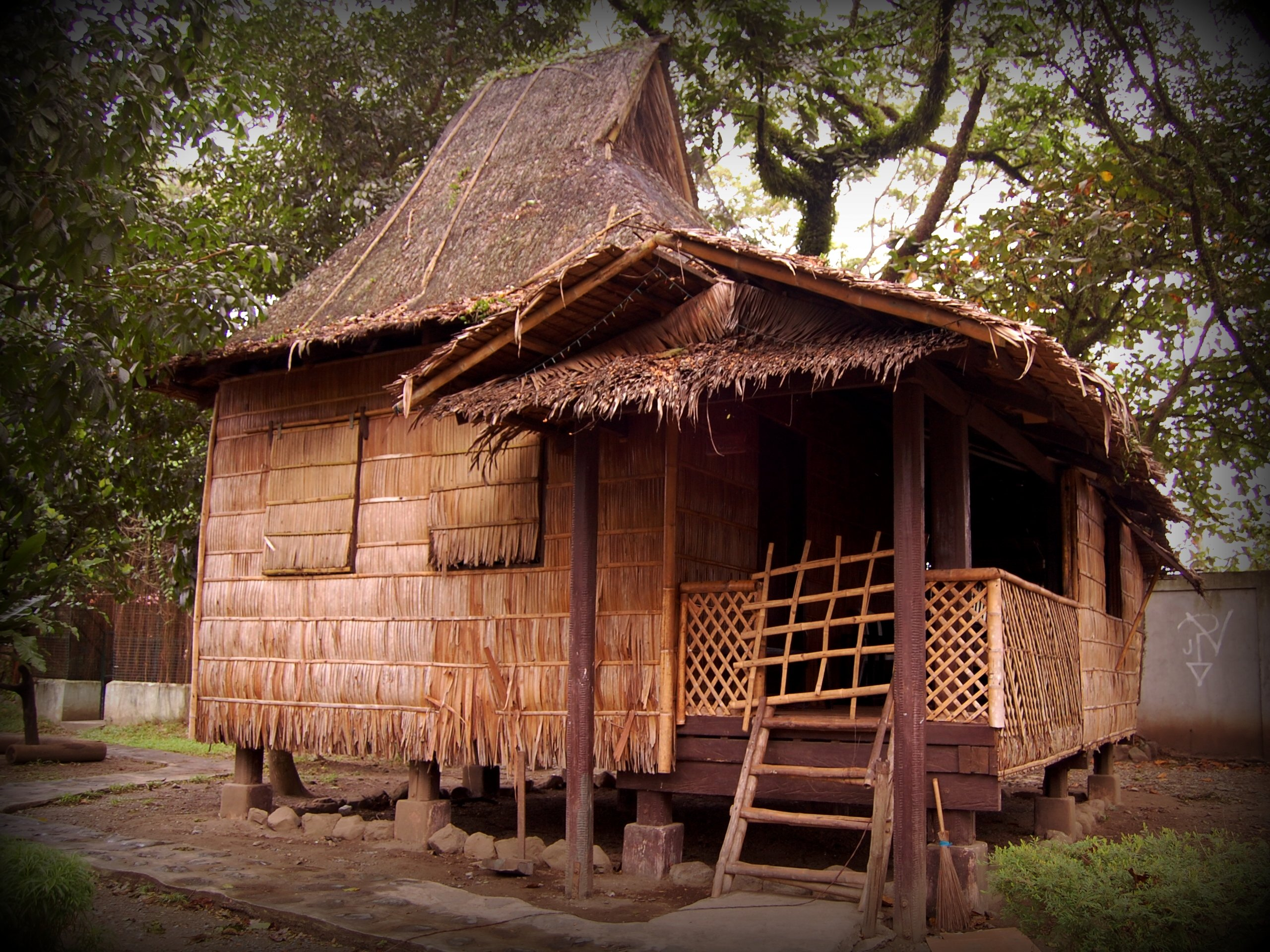
A Tagalog bahay kubo from the Philippines

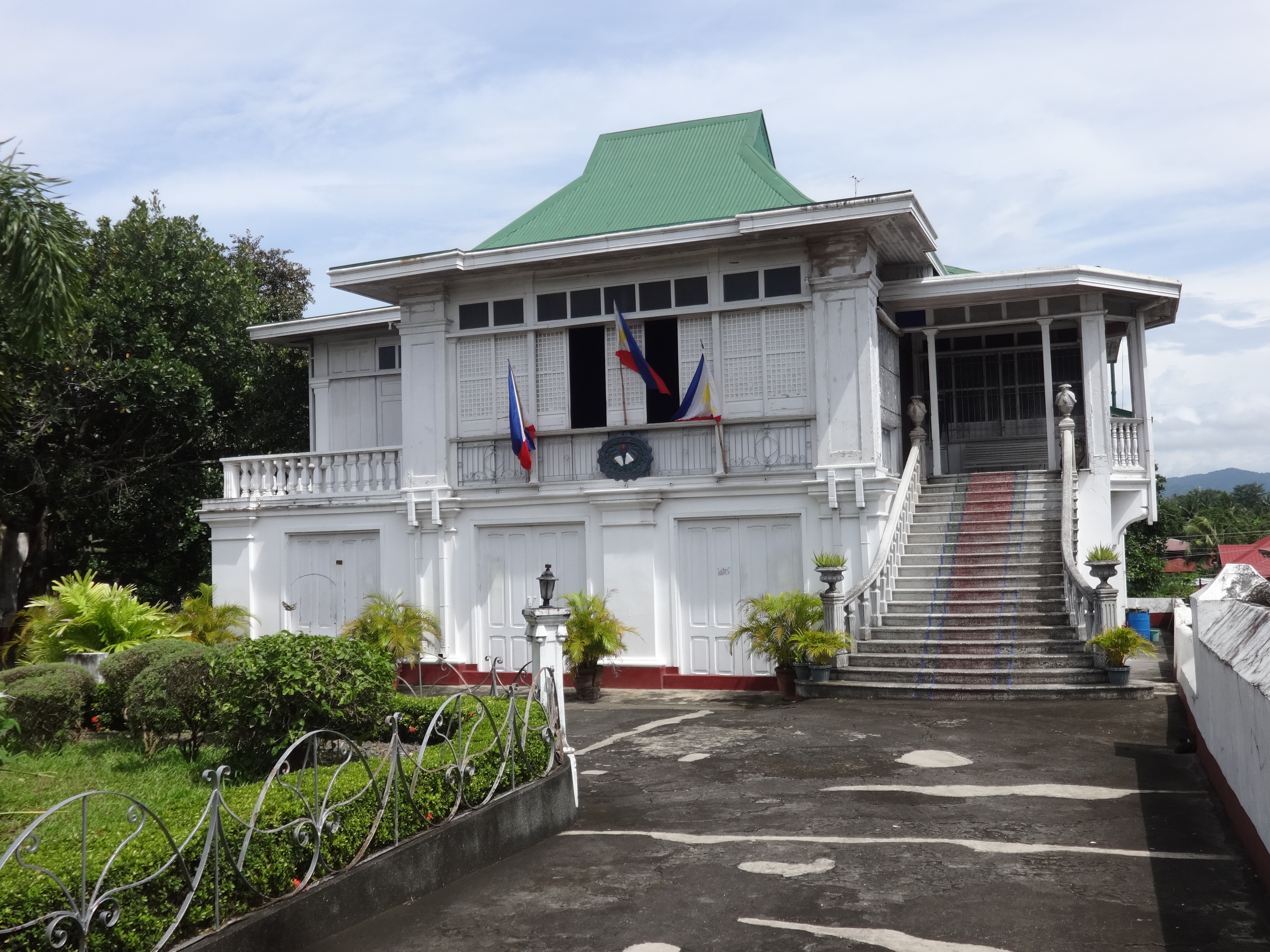
A bahay na bato from the Philippines

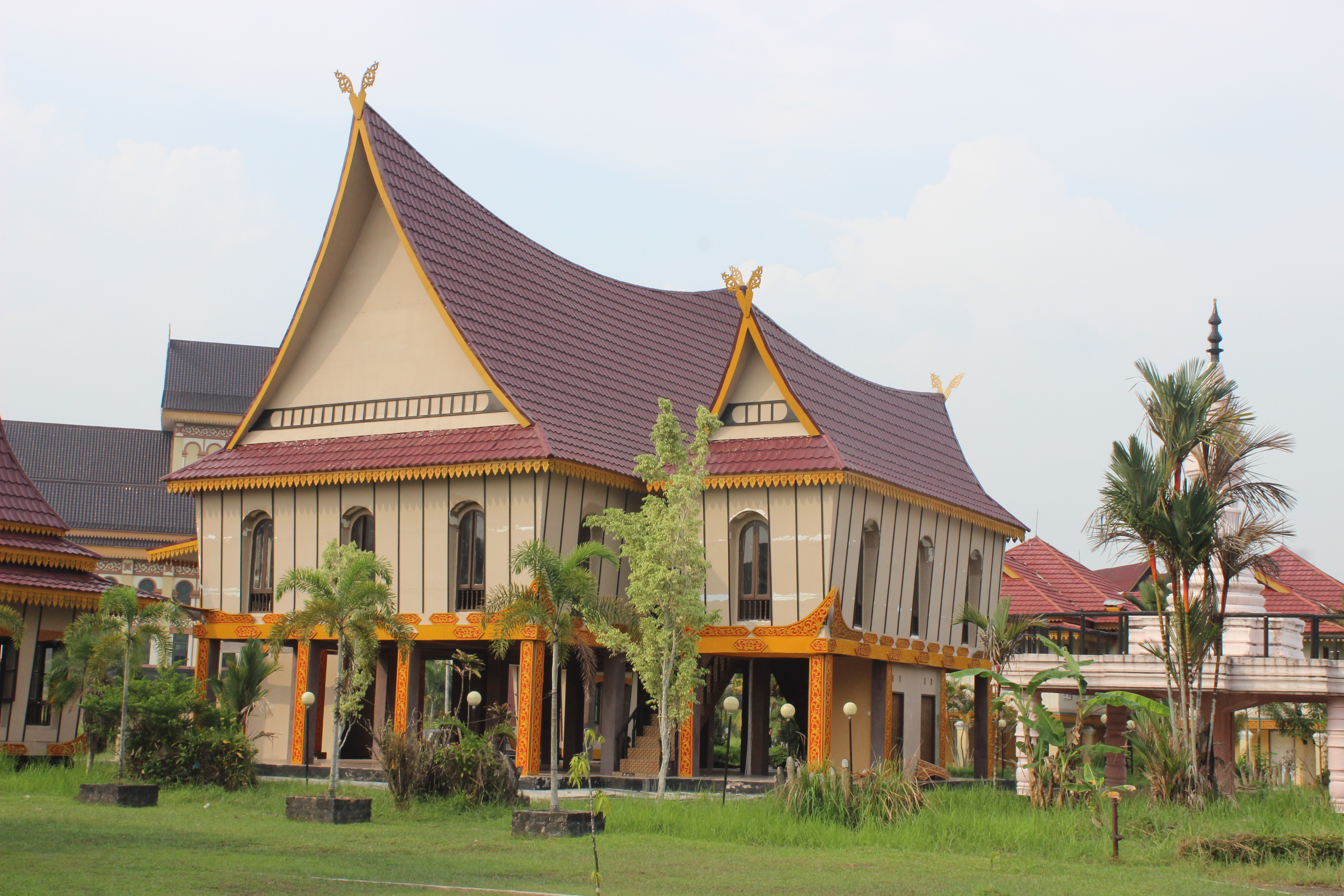
A Malay rumah from Malaysia

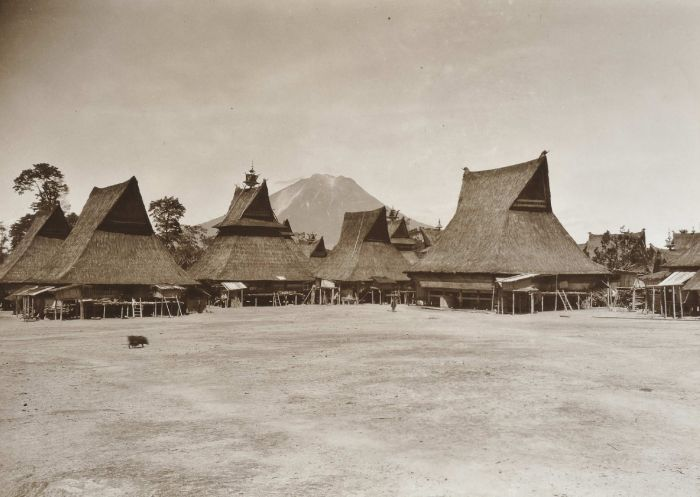
A Karo Batak rumah siwaluh jabu from Indonesia (c. 1920s)

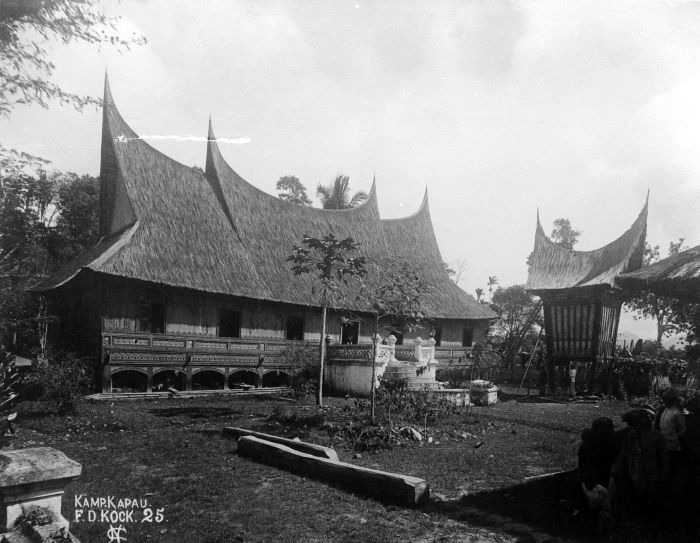
A Minangkabau rumah gadang from Indonesia (c. 1892–1900)

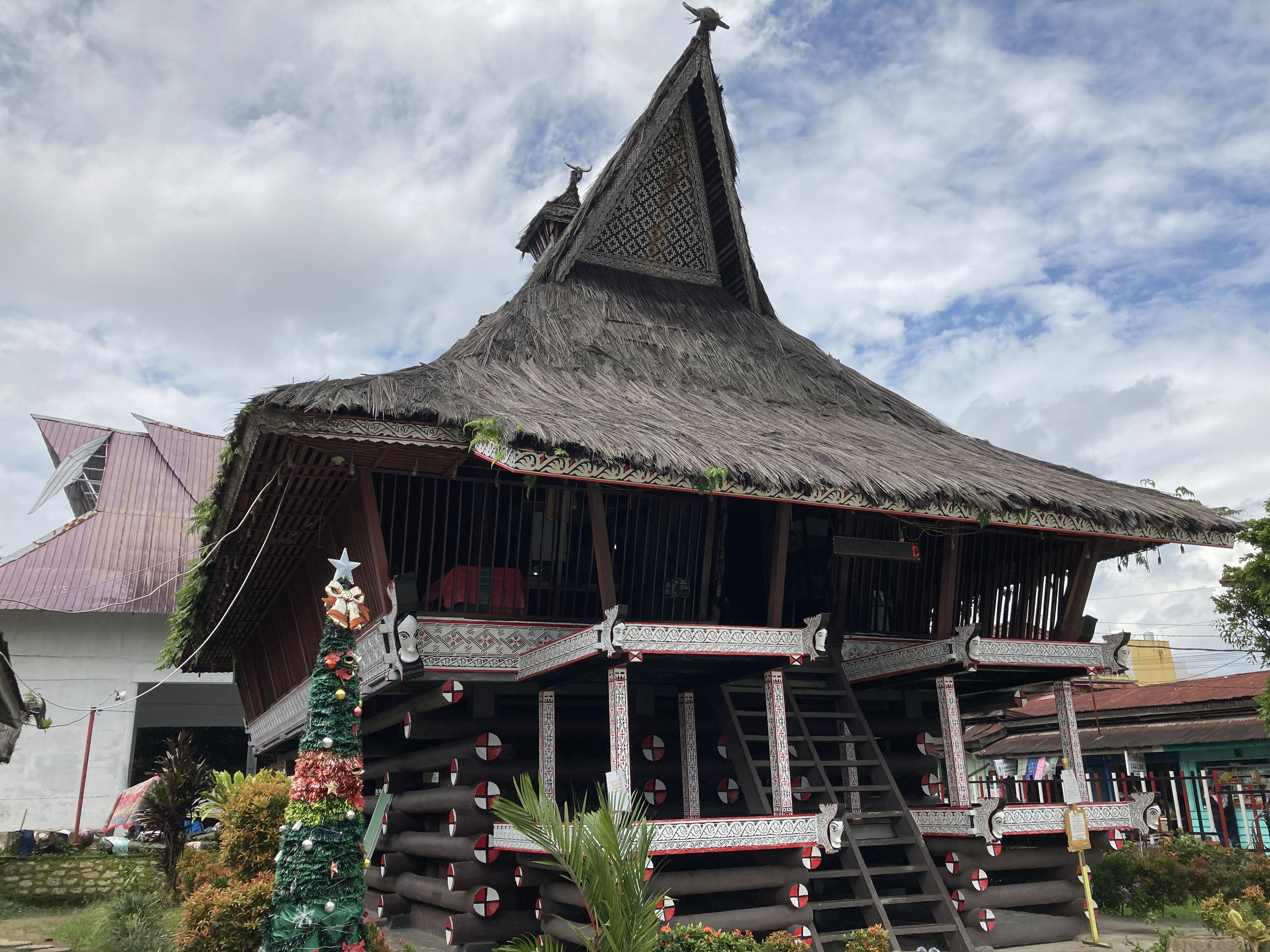
A Simalungun rumah from Indonesia

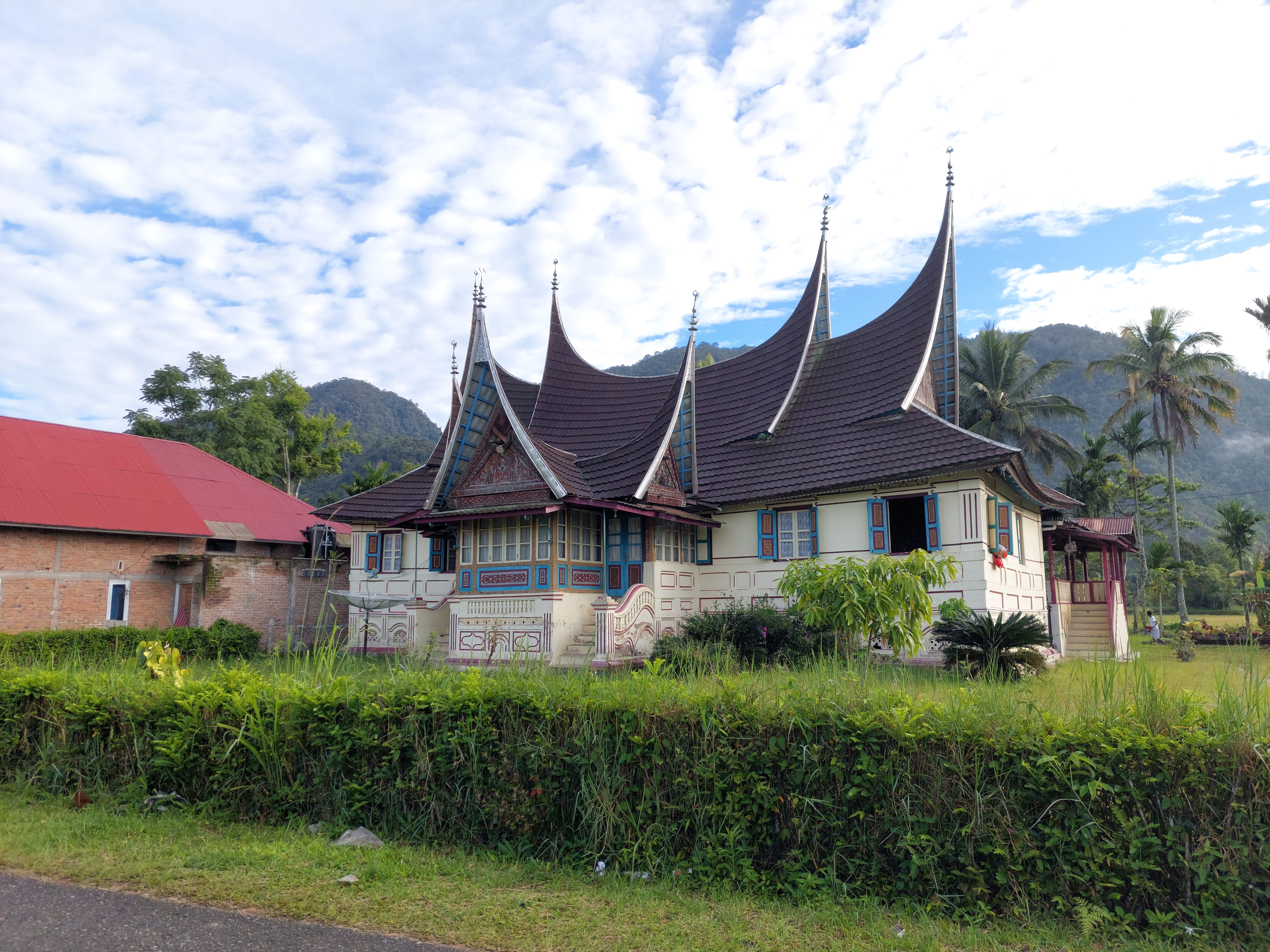
A Minangkabau rumah gadang from Indonesia

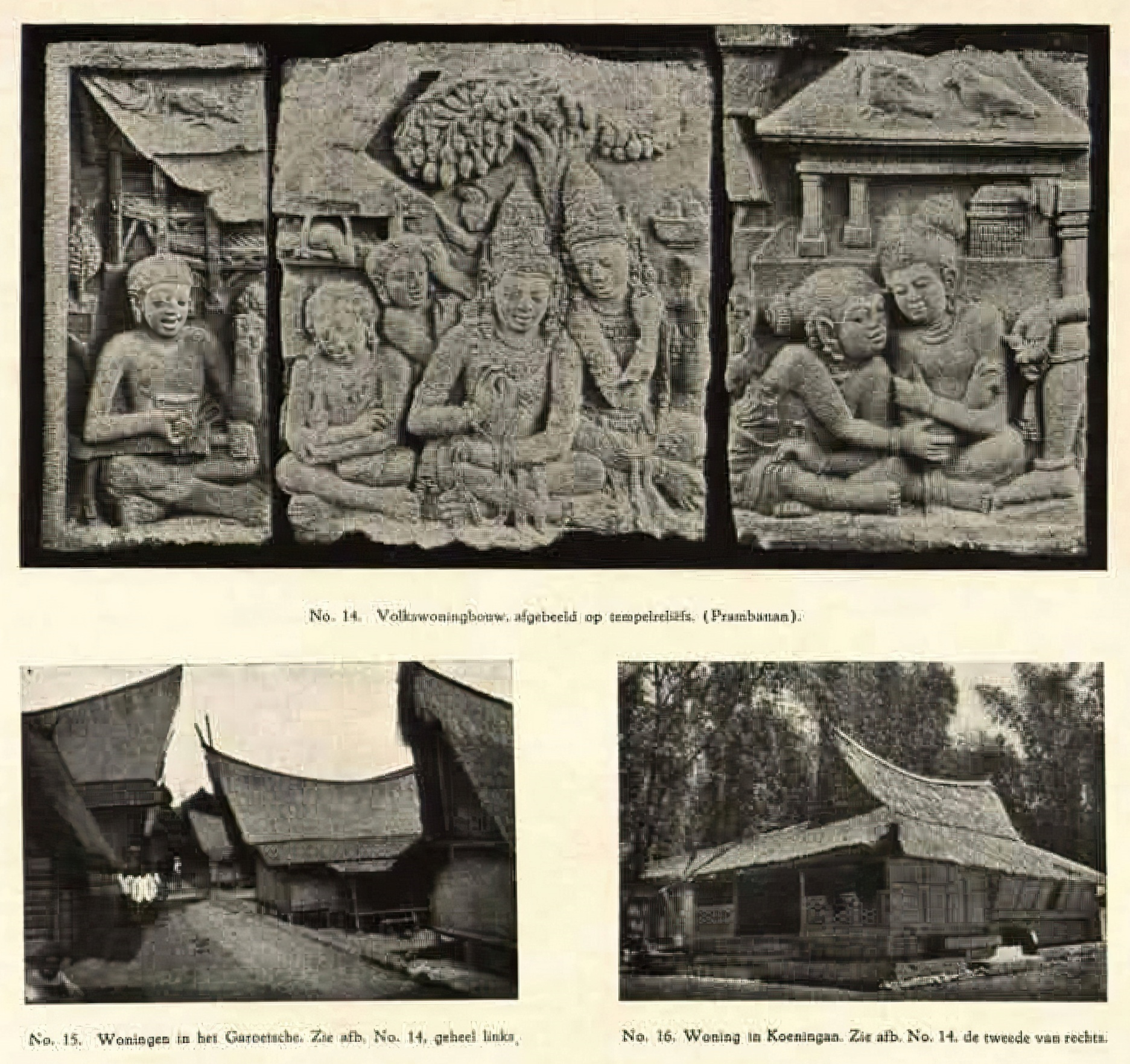
Sundanese houses from the 1920s and the 9th century Prambanan temple bas-reliefs of Indonesia

== See also ==
- Gablet roof
