= Hualin Temple (Fuzhou) =

Former Buddhist temple in Fuzhou, China

- 華林寺
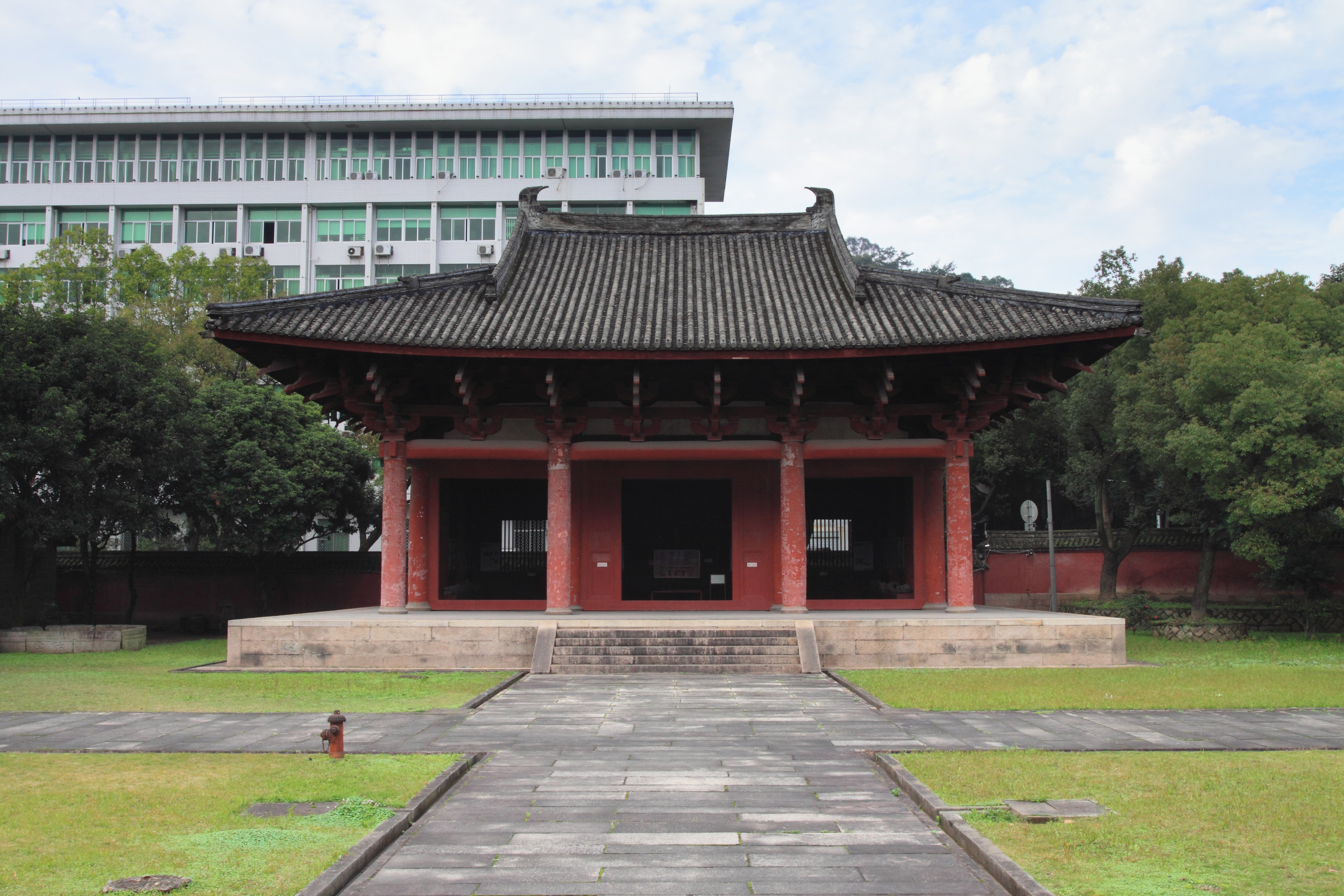
- Main Hall at Hualin Temple.

- Location within Fujian

Religion
- Affiliation: Buddhism
- Deity: Chan Buddhism

Location
- Location: Gulou District, Fuzhou, Fujian
- Country: China
- Coordinates: 26°06′11.74″N 119°17′31.47″E

Architecture
- Style: Chinese architecture
- Established: 964

Hualin Temple (simplified Chinese: 华林寺; traditional Chinese: 華林寺; pinyin: Huálín Sì) is a Buddhist temple located in Gulou District, Fuzhou, Fujian, China. The oldest building in the temple is the Main Hall, which was built during the early Song dynasty (960–1279).

== History ==
=== Song dynasty ===
Hualin Temple was first built with the name of "Yueshan Jixiang Chan Temple" (越山吉祥禅院) in 964 by the then provincial governor of Fuzhou, Bao Xiurang (鮑修讓), under the kingdom of Wuyue in the Five Dynasties and Ten Kingdoms (907–960). During the reign of Emperor Gaozong (1127–1162), he inscribed the name on a plaque. In the Song and Ming dynasties, the temple was renowned for its quiet and beautiful environment, which attracted many literati to come and compose poems to eulogize the temple, including Li Gang, Zhang Jun, Wang Yingshan, and Xie Zhaozhi.

=== Ming dynasty ===
In 1444, in the ruling of Emperor Yingzong in the Ming dynasty (1368–1644), the emperor inscribed and honored the name "Hualin Temple" (華林寺), which is still in use now.

=== Qing dynasty ===
In 1644, the year of the founding of the Qing dynasty (1644–1911), Hualin Temple was renovated by monks. In 1668, in the ruling of Kangxi Emperor (1662–1722), it was refurbished again. The temple became dilapidated due to neglect in the Yongzheng era (1723–1735). It was enlarged in the Jiaqing (1796–1820) and Daoguang periods (1821–1850). Lin Zexu, a notable official in the Qing court, wrote an article about the reconstruction project.

=== People's Republic of China ===
After the establishment of the People's Republic of China in 1953, Hualin Temple was designated as a provincial level cultural heritage site by the Fujian Provincial Government.

In 1966, Mao Zedong launched the ten-year Cultural Revolution. The shanmen, Hall of Four Heavenly Kings, corridors, and walls were demolished by the Red Guards, with only the Main Hall remaining.

On 23 February 1982, the Main Hall of Hualin Temple was listed among the second batch of "Major National Historical and Cultural Sites in Fujian" by the State Council of China.

Hualin Temple was officially reopened to the public in the Chinese New Year of 1990.

== Architecture ==
=== Main Hall ===
The Main Hall in the temple has a single-eave gable and hip roof covered with black tiles, representing water, and which could extinguish fire. It still preserves the architectural style of the early Song dynasty. The Main Hall is 15.5 metres (51 ft) high, three rooms wide, four rooms deep and covers an area of 574 square metres (6,180 sq ft). It is rectangular in shape with eight purlins and four pillars. It is the earliest wooden architecture in Jiangnan.

== Gallery ==
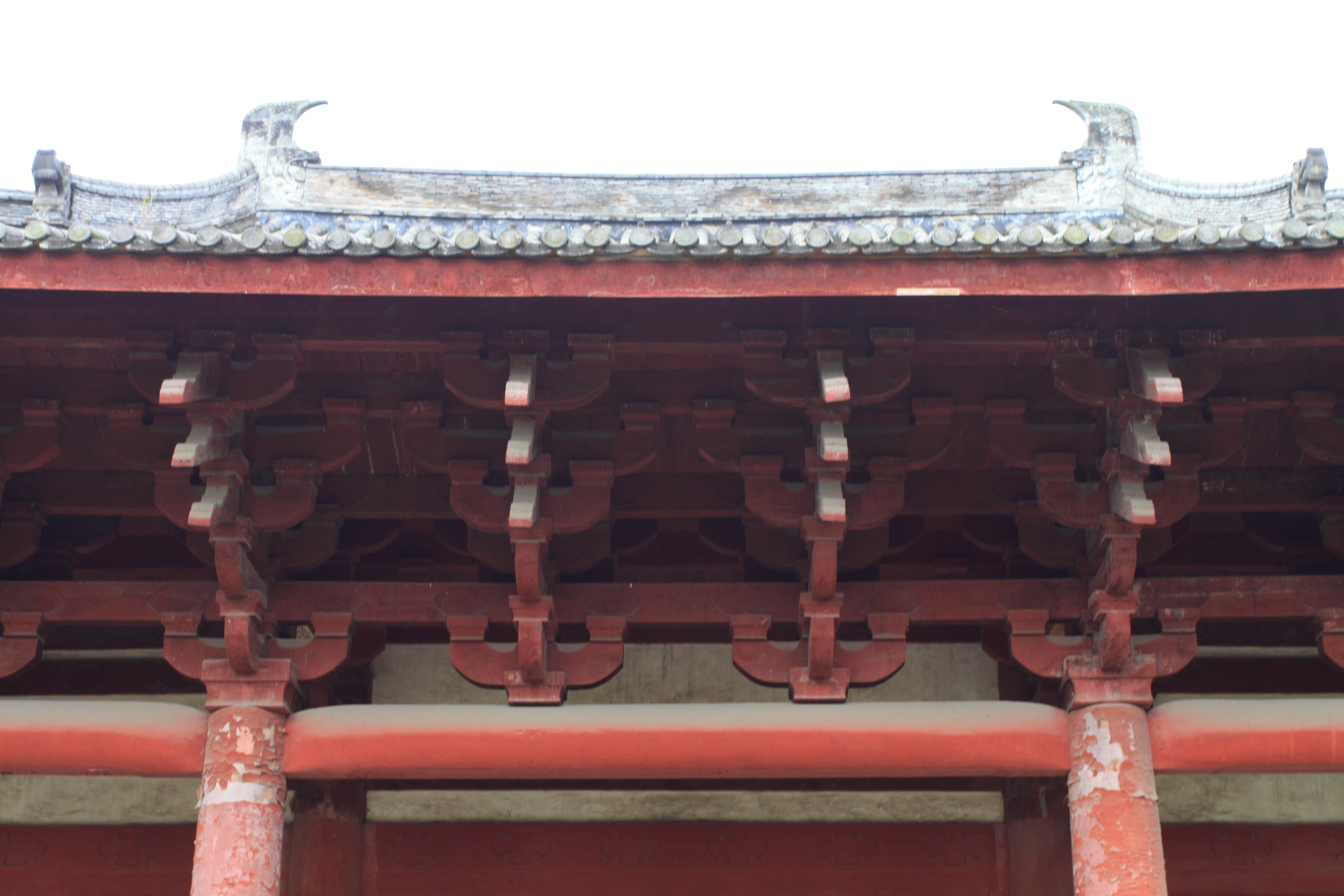
Main Hall.

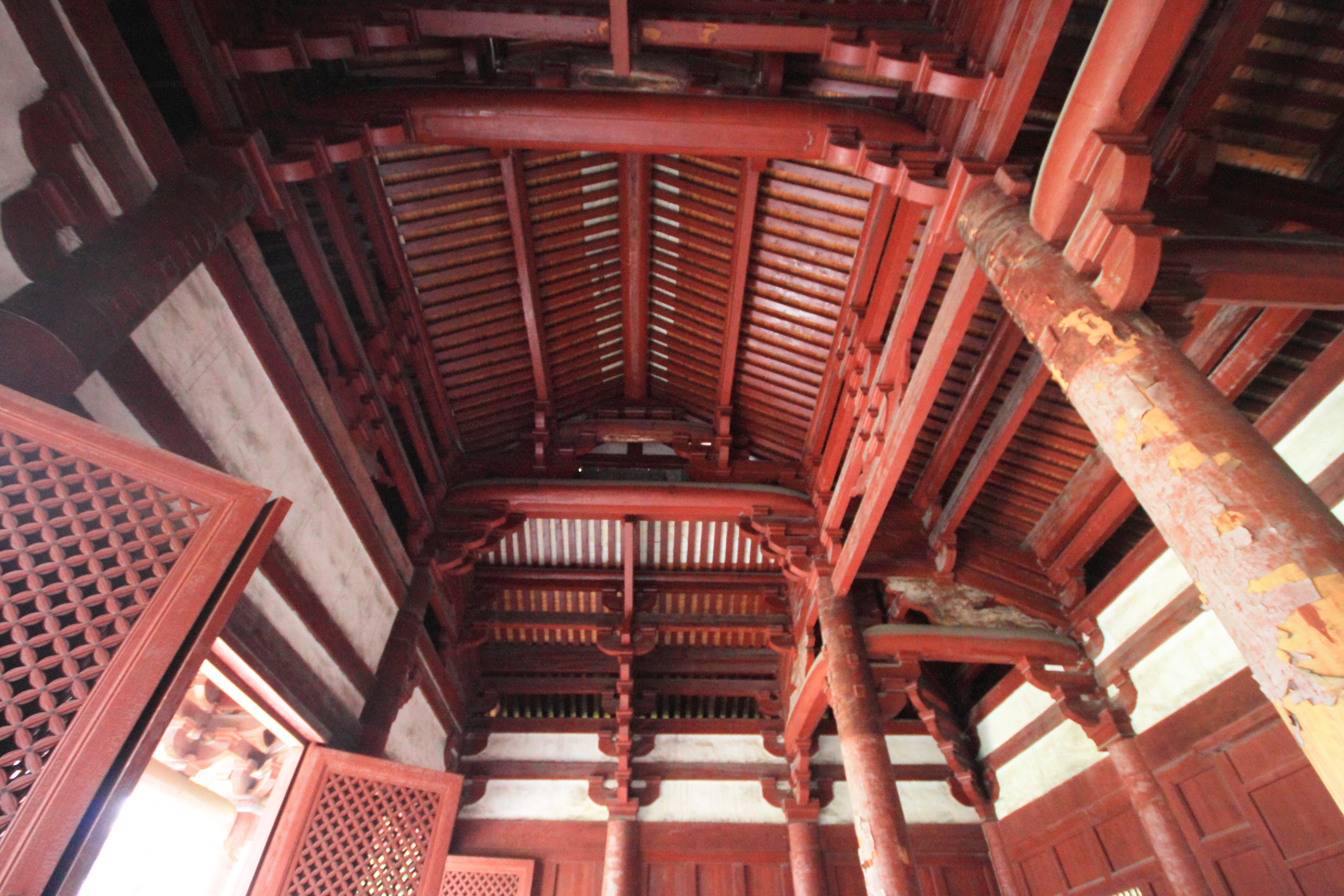
Roof of the Main Hall.

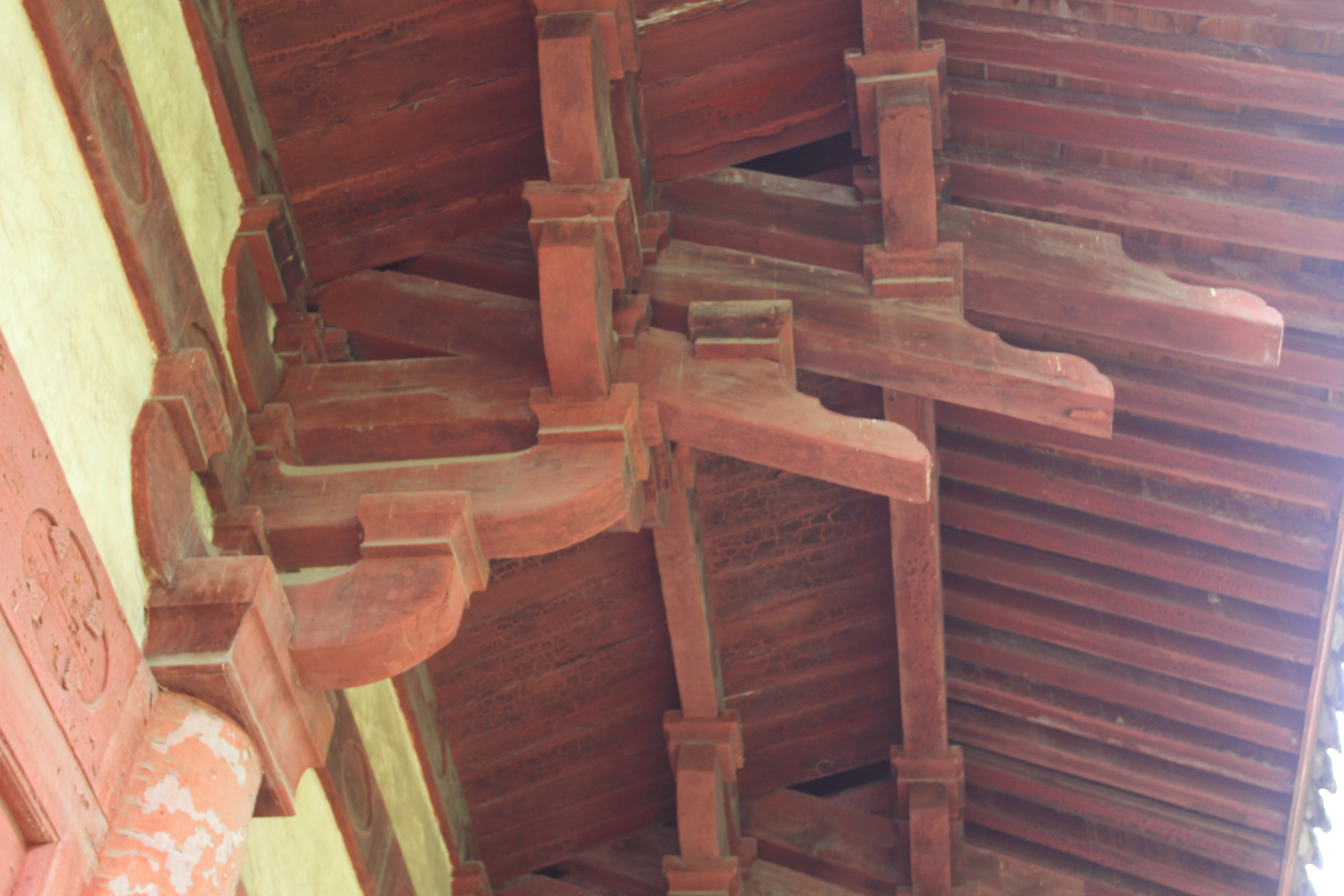
Dougong.

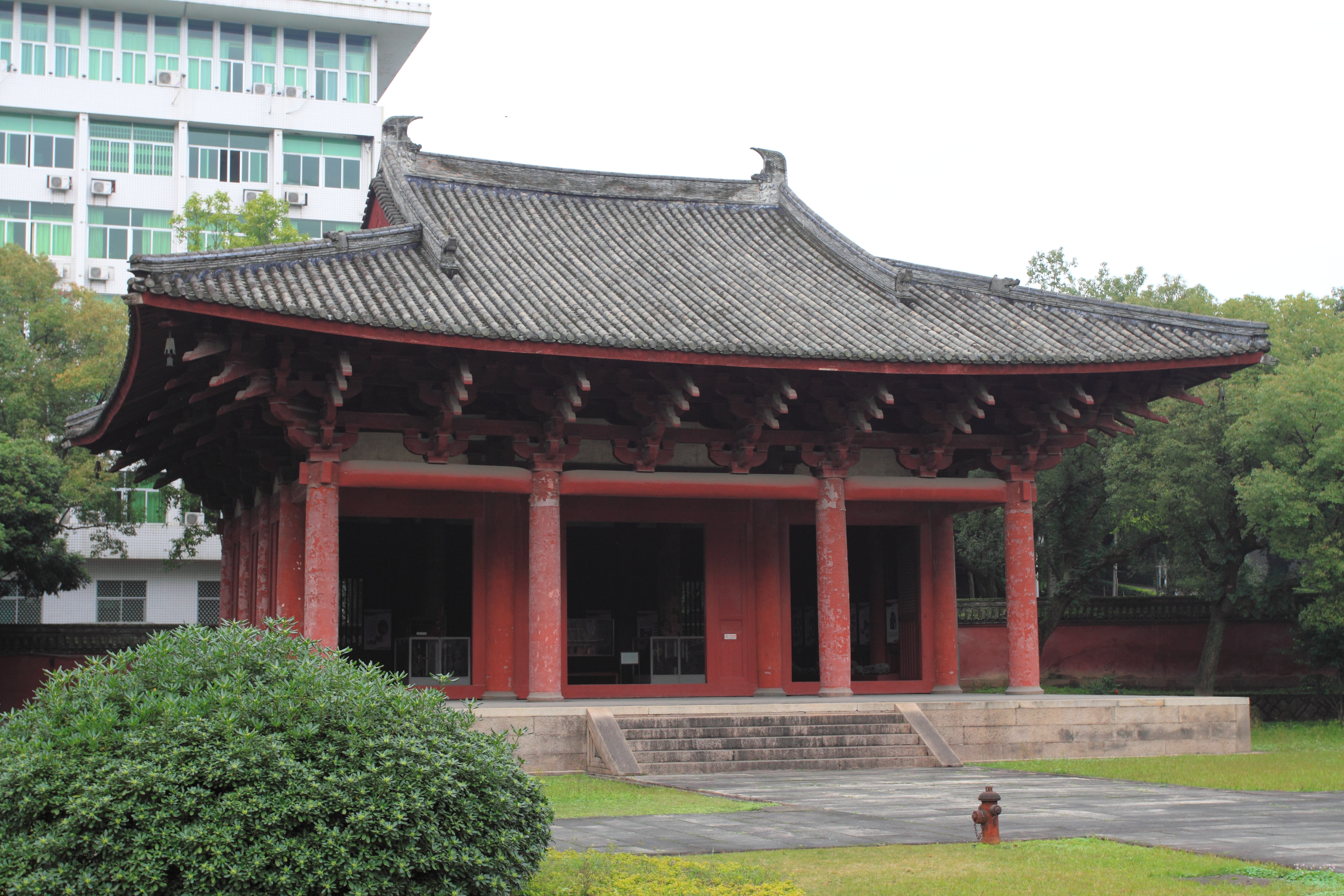
Main Hall.
