= Taihuai =

- Town

Chinese transcription(s)
  - Simplified: 台怀
  - Traditional: 臺懷
  - Pinyin: Taíhuaí
- A view over the Taihuai Town from Mount Wutai.

- Location in Shanxi
- Coordinates: 39°00′32″N 113°35′27″E
- Country: China
- Province: Shanxi
- County: Wutai County

Area
  - Total: 189 km^{2} (73 sq mi)

Population (2000)
  - Total: 10,525
  - Density: 55.7/km^{2} (144/sq mi)
- Time zone: UTC+8 (China Standard)
- Postal code: 035515
- Area code: 0350

Taihuai (simplified Chinese: 台怀; traditional Chinese: 臺懷; pinyin: Taíhuaí) is a town in Wutai County, Xinzhou, Shanxi, China. As of the 2000 census it had a population of 10,525 and an area of 189 square kilometres (73 sq mi). The Han, Manchu, Mongolian and Tibetan live here. Taihuai located in the northeastern Wutai County. It borders the Yedou Peak (叶斗峰) in the north, Guayue Peak (挂月峰) and Fanshi County in the west, Mount Taihang and Shizui Township in the east, and Jingangku Township and Lingjing Township in the south.

== History ==
In the Xu Xiake's Travels, Xu Xiake (1587-1641) described the town as "Under the north Mount Wutai, Taiwan (Taihuai) is located in the west of eastern Mount Wutai, in the north of southern Mount Wutai.".

== Administrative division ==
As of 2016, it include 22 villages: Dongtaigou Village (东台沟村), Guangmingsi Village (光明寺村), Dongzhuang Village (东庄村), Yangpodao Village (杨坡道村), Yanglin Village (杨林村), Taihuai Village (台怀村), Xinfang Village (新坊村), Yangboyu Village (杨柏峪村), Chegou Village (车沟村), Zhulinsi Village (竹林寺村), Qingliangshe Village (清凉社村), Loushang Village (楼上村), Miaogou Village (庙沟村), Rizhaosi Village (日照寺村), Da'nanzhuang Village (大南庄村), Kuantan Village (宽滩村), Huangtuzui Village (黄土咀村), Baitou'an Village (白头庵村), Huyingou Village (护银沟村), Nanta Village(南塔村), Shifo Village (石佛村), and Luobaogou Village (落宝沟村).

== Geography ==
The Lingjiu Peak (灵鹫峰), with a height of 168 metres (551 ft) above sea level, located in the town. Mount Dailuoding (黛螺顶), also known as "Green Mount Peak" (青峰顶), located in the east of the town. Mount Fanxian (梵仙山), located in the south of the town.

There are more than 595 plant species cultivated in the town. There are some 142 species of bird and 208 species of mammals to be seen in the town.

=== Climate ===
Taihuai is in the temperate continental climate zone, with an average annual temperature of 4.5 °C (40.1 °F), total annual rainfall of 700 to 800 mm, a frost-free period of 90 to 110 days. The highest temperature is 27 °C (81 °F), and the lowest temperature is −44.5 °C (−48.1 °F).

== Attractions ==
There are more than thirty Buddhist temples in the town, including Jinge Temple, Mimi Temple, Xiantong Temple, Tayuan Temple, Wanfo Pavilion, Luohou Temple, Yuanzhao Temple, Guangzong Temple, Pusading, Cifu Temple, Shuxiang Temple, Longquan Temple, Zhenhai Temple, Nanshan Temple, Bishan Temple, Lingfeng Temple, Shouning Temple, Guangren Temple, Puhua Temple, Santa Temple, Qifu Temple, Guanghua Temple, Fanxian Temple, Jifu Temple, Pushou Temple, Jixiang Temple, Wuye Temple, and Mingyue Chi.
