= Shuxiang Temple =

Buddhist temple in Shanxi, China

- 殊像寺
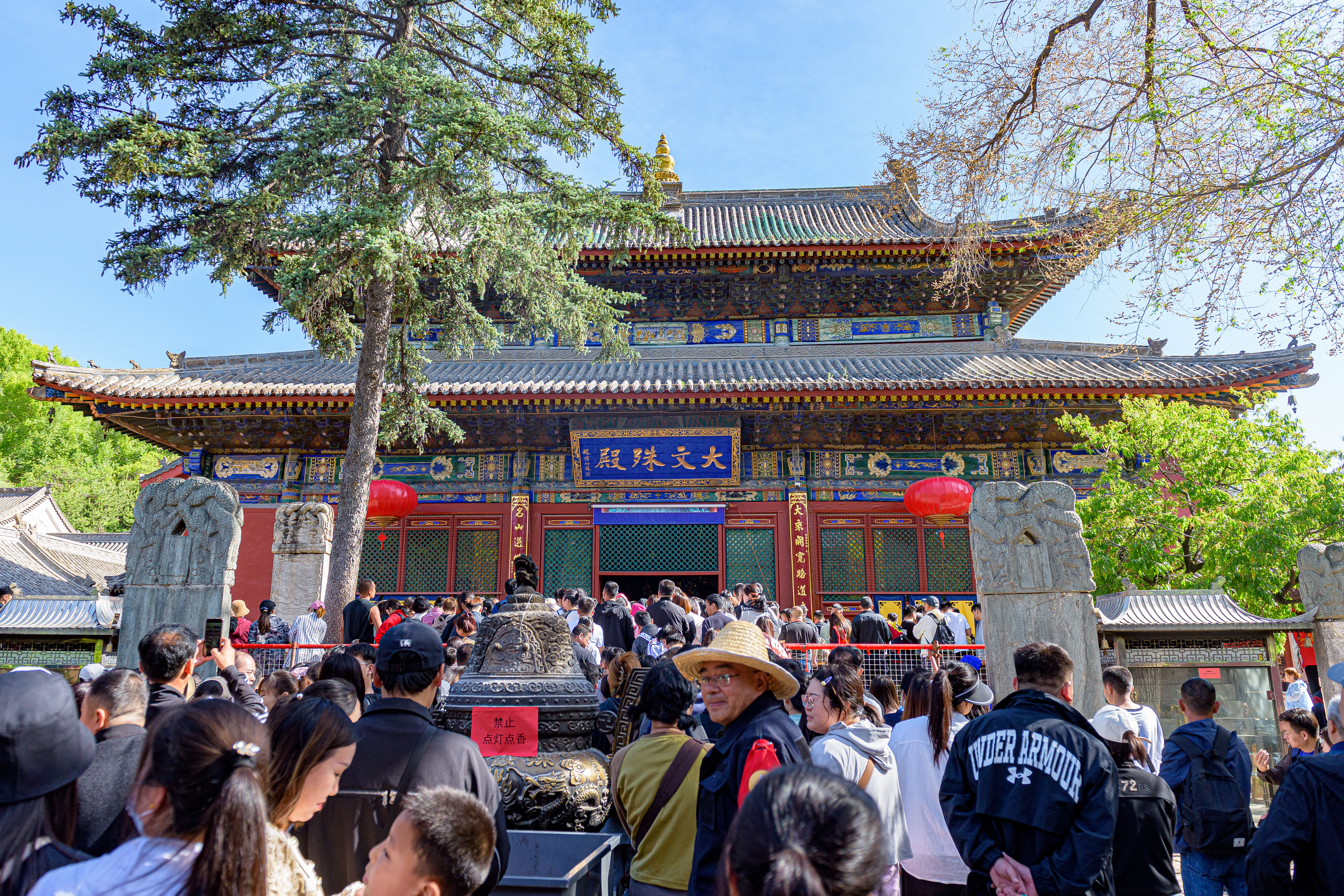

- Location within Shanxi

Religion
- Affiliation: Buddhism

Location
- Location: Mount Wutai, Wutai County, Shanxi, China
- Interactive map of Shuxiang Temple
- Coordinates: 39°00′33″N 113°35′58″E

Architecture
- Type: Chinese architecture

Shuxiang Temple (Chinese: 殊像寺) located in southwestern of Taihuai in Mount Wutai, Shanxi, China. Shuxiang Temple is one of the National Key Buddhist Temples in Han Chinese Area. It is also listed in Major Historical and Cultural Sites Protected in Shanxi Province, China.

== About ==
Shuxiang Temple was built during the early years of the East Jin dynasty, and was rebuilt during the Tang dynasty, Yuan dynasty (in year 1325), and Ming dynasty (in year 1496). It is located on the southwest side of Tayuan Temple, covers 6,400 square meters (7,654.6 square yards), and encompasses over 50 palaces and halls. The name of the temple comes from the fact that it was built for worshiping Manjushri. There is a color statue of Manjushri riding suan ni (a son of a dragon, with a lion's appearance) within the Manjushri Hall in Shuxiang Temple. With a height of 9.87 metres, it is the highest Manjusri Statue in all the Mount Wutai temples. On the walls of the hall, there are sculpting paintings which inscribe the story of five hundred Arhats crossing the river. In front of the entrance of Shuxiang Temple, there is a clean spring, known as "Prajna Spring", which does not freeze in winter.

In 1983 it was designated as a "National Key Buddhist Temple in Han Chinese Area". In 1988, it was listed among the third group of "State Cultural Protection Relics Units" by the State Council of China.
