= Tayuan Temple =

Buddhist temple in Taihuai, China

Coordinates: 39°00′52″N 113°36′11″E

- 塔院寺
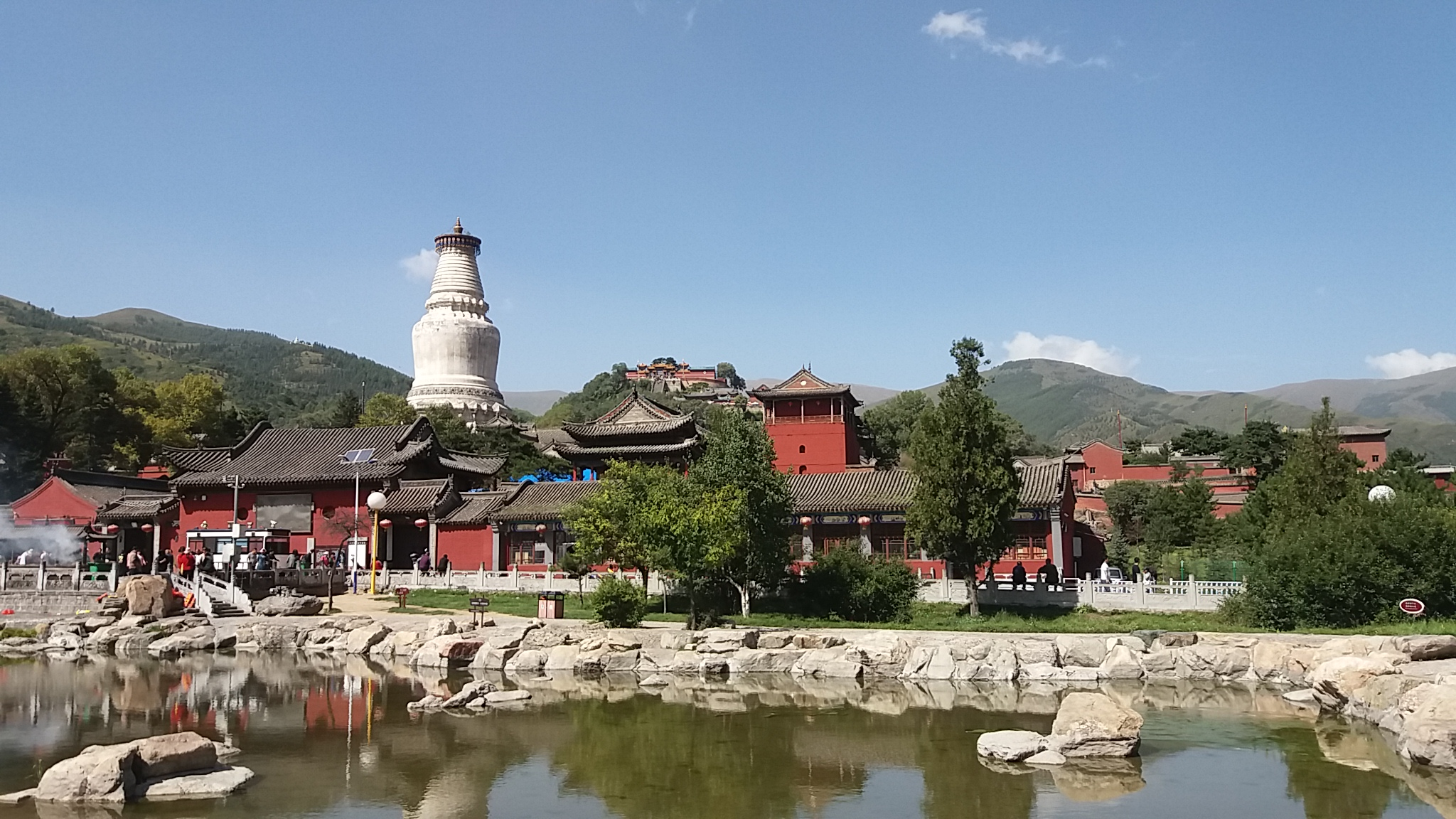
- Tayuan Temple

- Location within Shanxi

Religion
- Affiliation: Buddhism
- Sect: Chan Buddhism

Location
- Location: Wutai County, Shanxi, China
- Interactive map of Tayuan Temple

Architecture
- Type: Nepalese architecture
- Style: Newari architecture
- Creator: Arniko
- Established: 1302

Tayuan Temple (Chinese: 塔院寺; pinyin: Tǎyuàn Sì) is located in the central area of Taihuai town in Mount Wutai, Shanxi Province, China. Tayuan Temple was originally a stupa of Xiantong Temple. The stupa, named the Great White Pagoda, was constructed in the 6th year of DaDe reign of the Yuan dynasty (1302 AD). In the 5th year of Yongle reign of the Ming dynasty (1407AD), it was expanded to a temple and got its name as Tayuan Temple. It is listed in the Major Historical and Cultural Sites Protected in Shanxi Province, China.

== About ==
It is one of the five famous temples for practicing Chan Buddhism, and also one of the ten famous temples for accommodating monks in Mount Wutai. Tayuan Temple stands in the north facing the south, consisting of rows of temple buildings and dorms for monks. Its axis is filled with magnificent structures such as screen walls, stone tablets, arches, stone stairways, passing doors, gates, drum towers, Tianwang Hall, Daci Yanshou Hall, Cangjing Mansion, Shanhai Mansion, Manjushri Hair Pagoda, and so on. It has an area of 15,000 square meters with over 130 halls and houses.

Currently, there are three exquisite wooden-arch structures that were built during the Wanli reign of the Ming dynasty. Shakyamuni Buddha Hall stands in front of the temple, Cangjing Mansion (library for sutras) in its back and the Great White Pagoda (Sharira Pagoda) in its middle. The statues in the halls are all well-preserved. There are 20 layers of wooden rotating wheels in the Cangjing Mansion, each of which is placed with over 20,000 Buddhism sutras in Chinese, Mongolian and Tibetan characters. Among them, there are over 2,000 complete and widely-read sutras that were written between the Song dynasty and the Qianlong reign of the Qing dynasty.

The Great White Pagoda is the main building in the temple. It is a Tibetan-style pagoda sits on a rectangle base. It is 75.3 m tall, constructed of brick with a lime coating on the outside that gives its white color, towering amongst the mountains and trees and standing out with its white pagoda. The tower spires, trays and pearls are all made of bronze. Wind-bells are decorated in the middle of the pagoda and the trays. When the bells all dance to the blowing wind, you will find the pagoda is so charming and enticing. To the east of the Great White Pagoda stands a smaller white pagoda. Legend has it that inside the pagoda stores the golden hairs of Manjushri Bodhisattva when He presents himself to the people on earth. Therefore, the smaller white pagoda is also called "Manjushri Hair Pagoda."

In 1983 it has been designated as a "National Key Buddhist Temple in Han Chinese Area". Today, people recognize this pagoda as a symbol of Mount Wutai. The Tayuan Temple has significant importance in China.

== Gallery ==
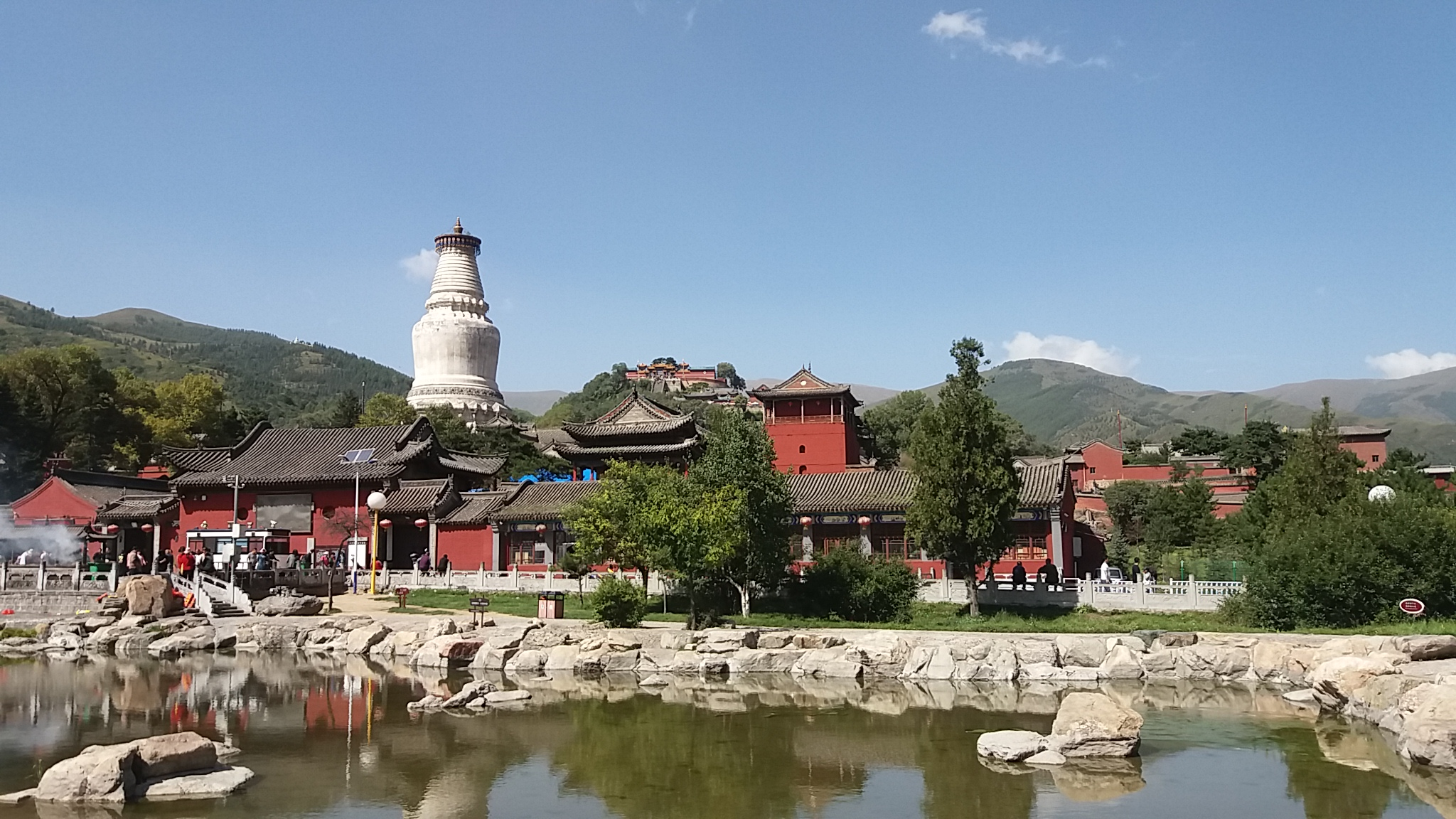
Tayuan Temple

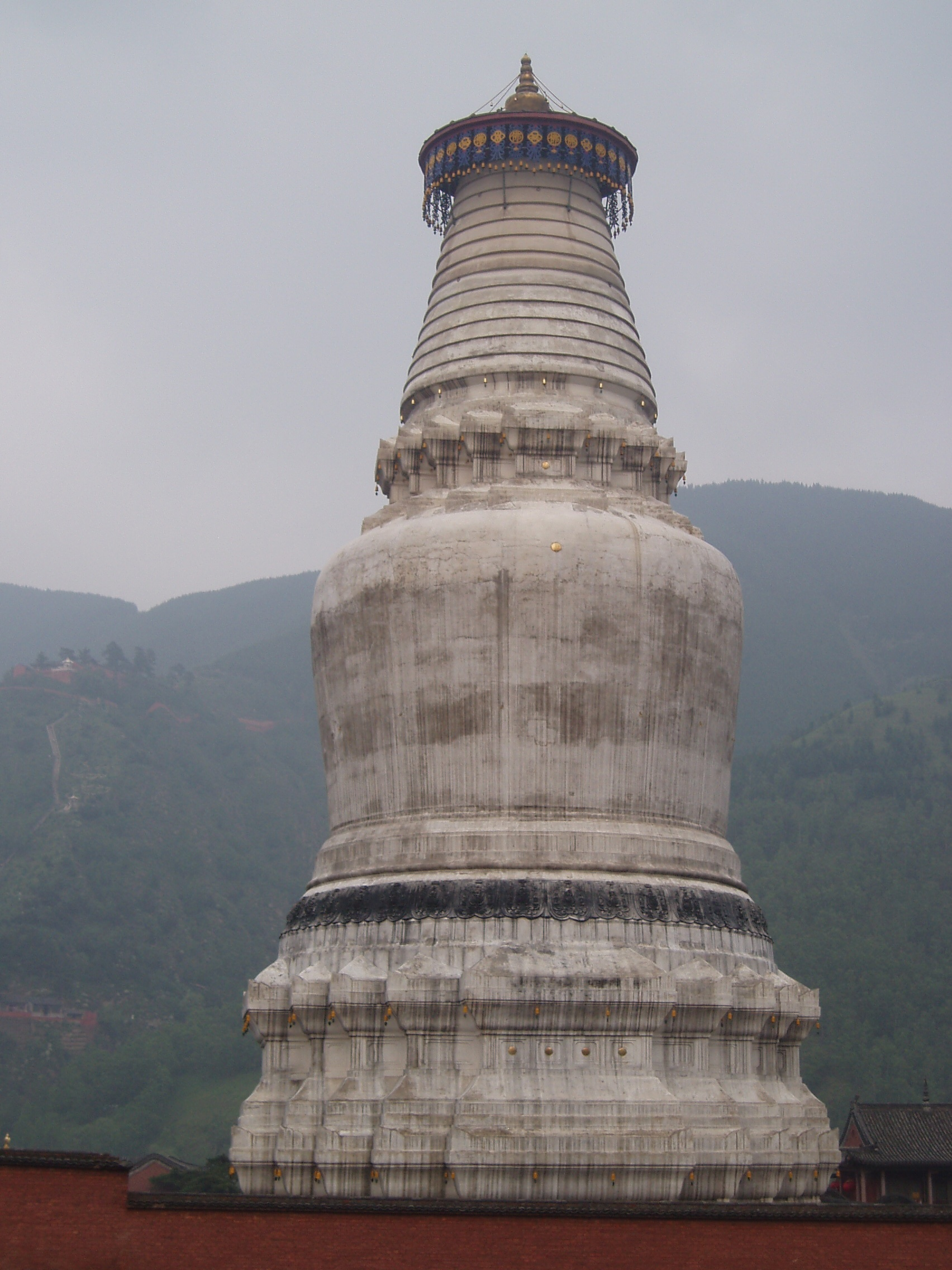
Great White Pagoda
