= Guangzong Temple (Mount Wutai) =

Buddhist temple in Taihuai, China

- 广宗寺
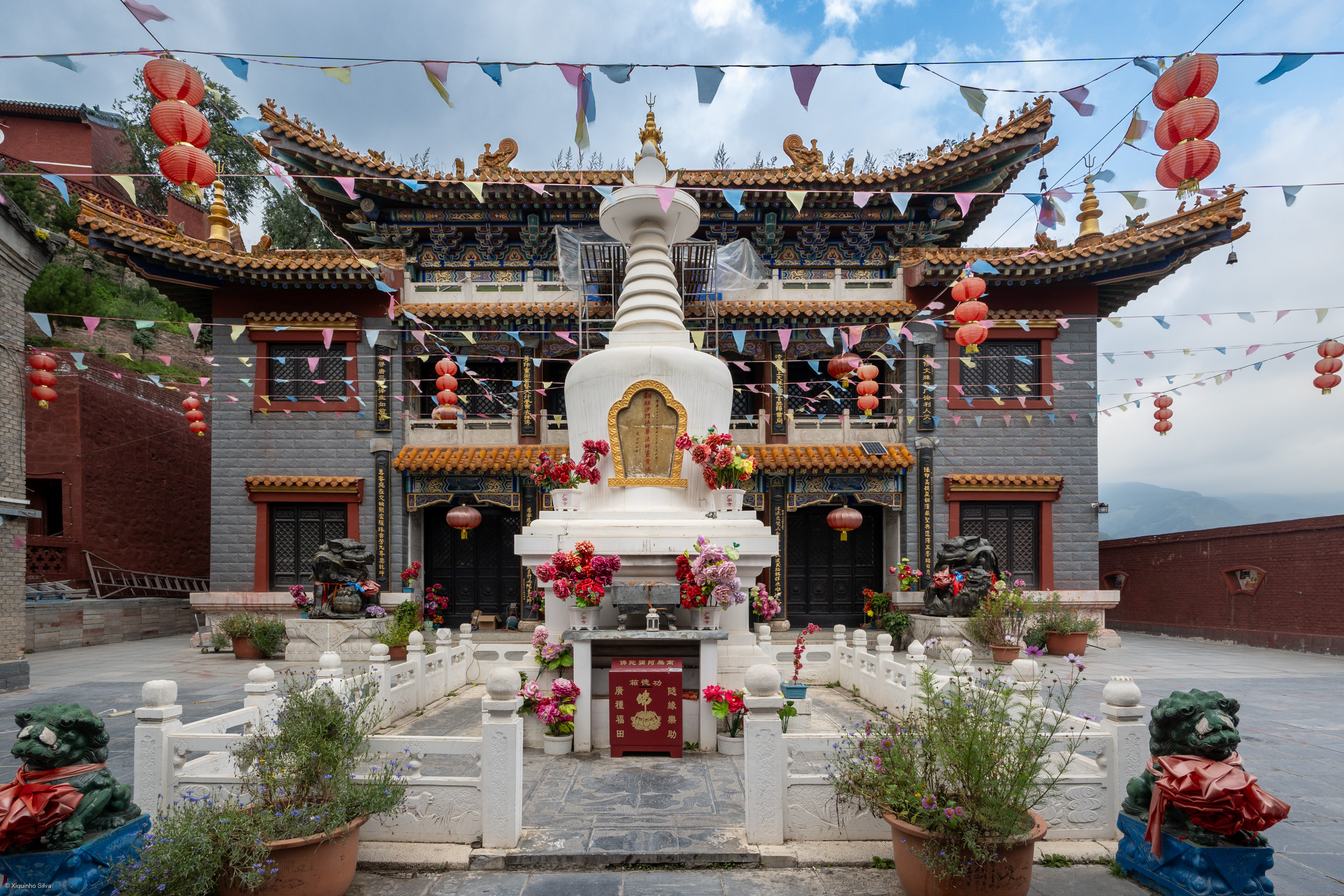

- Location within Shanxi

Religion
- Affiliation: Buddhism
- Sect: Chan Buddhism
- Leadership: Shi Yanming (释演明)

Location
- Location: Taihuai Town, Wutai County, Shanxi
- Country: China
- Interactive map of Guangzong Temple
- Coordinates: 39°01′03″N 113°36′08″E

Architecture
- Style: Chinese architecture
- Founder: Zhengde Emperor
- Established: 1507
- Completed: Qing dynasty (reconstruction)

Guangzong Temple (simplified Chinese: 广宗寺; traditional Chinese: 廣宗寺; pinyin: Guǎngzōng Sì), more commonly known as the Tongwadian (铜瓦殿; 銅瓦殿; Tóngwǎdiàn), is a Buddhist temple located on Mount Wutai, in Taihuai Town of Wutai County, Shanxi, China.

== History ==
According to Records of Qingliang Mountain (清涼山志), the temple was first construction by Zhengde Emperor in 1507 under the Ming dynasty (1368–1644) and rebuilt in the following Qing dynasty (1644–1911).

Guangzong Temple has been inscribed as a National Key Buddhist Temple in Han Chinese Area in 1983.

== Architecture ==
Guangzong Temple occupies a total area of 2,900 square metres (31,000 sq ft) with 28 rooms and halls.

=== Main Hall ===
The Main Hall, also known as "Grand Buddha Hall", is divided into upper and lower storeys with double-eaves gable and hip roofs.

The upper storey enshrining the Three Saints of Hua-yan (华严三圣). In the middle is Sakyamuni, statues of Manjushri and Samantabhadra stand on the left and right sides of Sakyamuni's statue. The statues of Eighteen Arhats stand on both sides.

And the lower storey enshrining the Three Sages of the West (西方三圣), namely Guanyin, Amitabha and Mahasthamaprapta.

=== Stupa of Master Fazun ===
After the Parinirvana of Master Fazun (法尊), monks of Guangzong Temple elected a stupa for him. The stupa is 6 metres (20 ft) high.
