= Luohou Temple =

Buddhist temple in Shanxi, China

- 罗睺寺
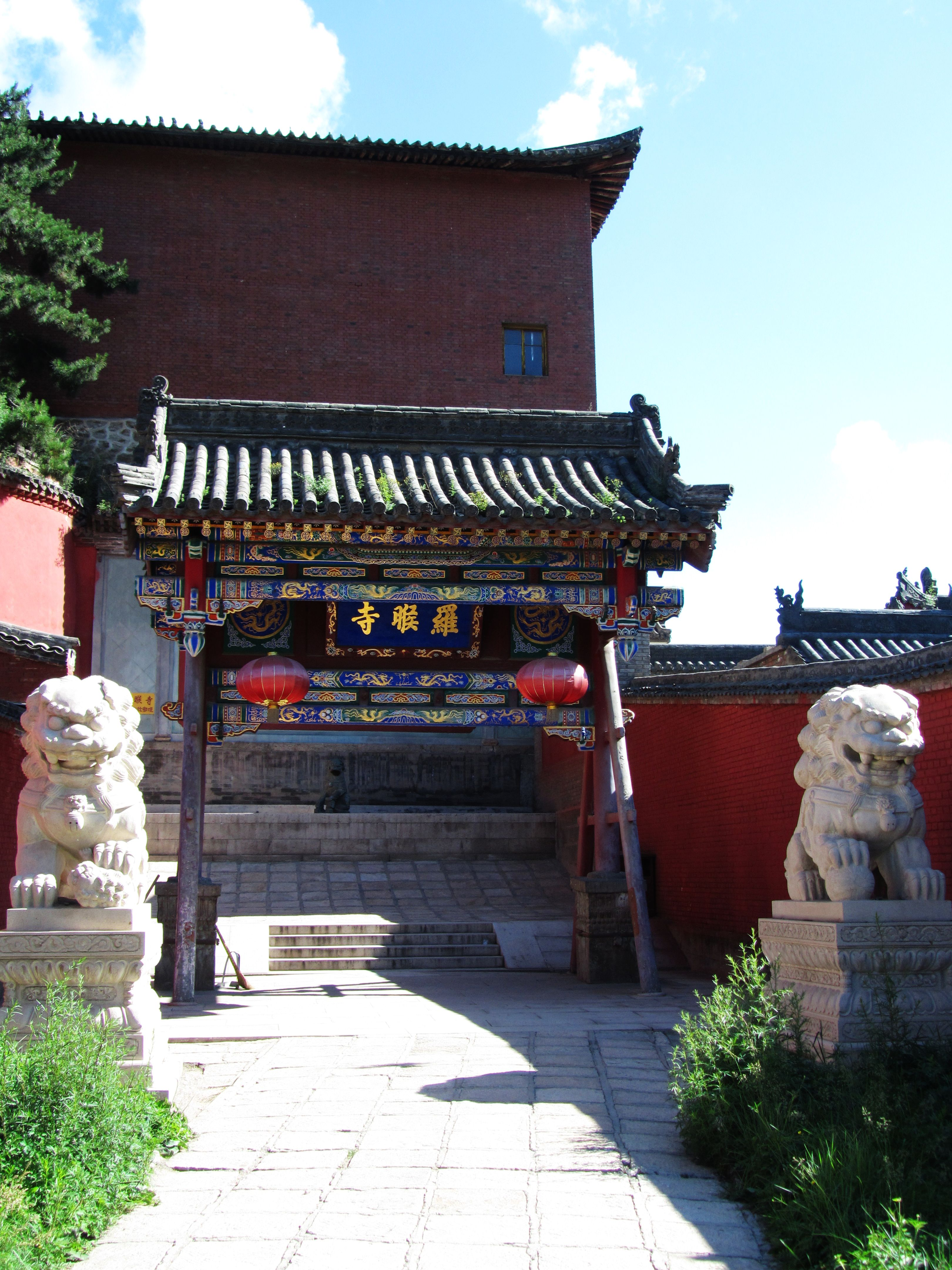
- The paifang at Luohou Temple.

- Location within Shanxi

Religion
- Affiliation: Buddhism
- Sect: Tibetan Buddhism-Gelug

Location
- Location: Wutai County, Shanxi, China
- Coordinates: 39°00′54″N 113°36′14″E

Architecture
- Style: Chinese architecture
- Established: Tang dynasty (607-918)

The Luohou Temple (simplified Chinese: 罗睺寺; traditional Chinese: 羅睺寺; pinyin: Luóhóu Sì) is a Buddhist temple located in Taihuai Town of Wutai County, Xinzhou, Shanxi, China.

== Name ==
Luohou Temple was named after Rāhula and Luo Hou Luo (Chinese: 罗睺罗; pinyin: Luó hóu Luó) for short, the only son of Siddhartha Gautama (commonly known as Buddha), and his wife Princess Yasodharā.

== History ==
The temple was first established in the Tang dynasty (618–907) and initially called Shanzhu Geyuan (善住阁院).

The temple was rebuilt in 1492, during the Hongzhi period (1488–1505) of Ming dynasty (1368–1644). During the Wanli period (1572–1620), Concubine Li Yanfei (李彦妃) donated property to restore the temple.

In 1705, in the 44th year of Kangxi period (1662–1722) of Qing dynasty (1644–1911), the temple converted to Tibetan Buddhism. In 1792, in the 57th year of Qianlong period (1736–1795), the temple was reconstruction.

In 1983, the temple has been classified as a "National Key Buddhist Temple in Han Chinese Area". In 2013, Luohou Temple is listed among the 7th batch of "State Cultural Protection Relics Units" by the State Council of China.

== Architecture ==
Luohou temple consists of more than 118 buildings. The complex includes the following halls: paifang, Tianwang-dian, Mahavira Hall, Wenshu-dian, Dafo-dian, Zangjing-ge, Fatang, Dining Room, etc.

=== Chinese guardian lions ===
On both sides of the Tianwang-dian there are two Chinese guardian lions. They were carved in the Tang dynasty (618–907).

=== Tianwang-dian ===
In the Tianwang-dian, or Hall of the Four Heavenly Kings, statues of the Four Heavenly Kings are enshrined. They are the eastern Dhṛtarāṣṭra, the southern Virūḍhaka, the western Virūpākṣa, and the northern Vaiśravaṇa.

=== Hall of Manjushri ===
The Wenshu-dian, or Hall of Manjushri, is the 2nd entry hall in the temple. A recumbent statue of Wenshu enshrined in the hall. The Manjusri Bodhisattva lies on a lotus.

=== Dafo-dian ===
Behind the Wenshu-dian is the Dafo-dian, or Great Buddha Hall, enshrining the statues of Shijiamouni, Amituofo and Yaoshi.

== Gallery ==
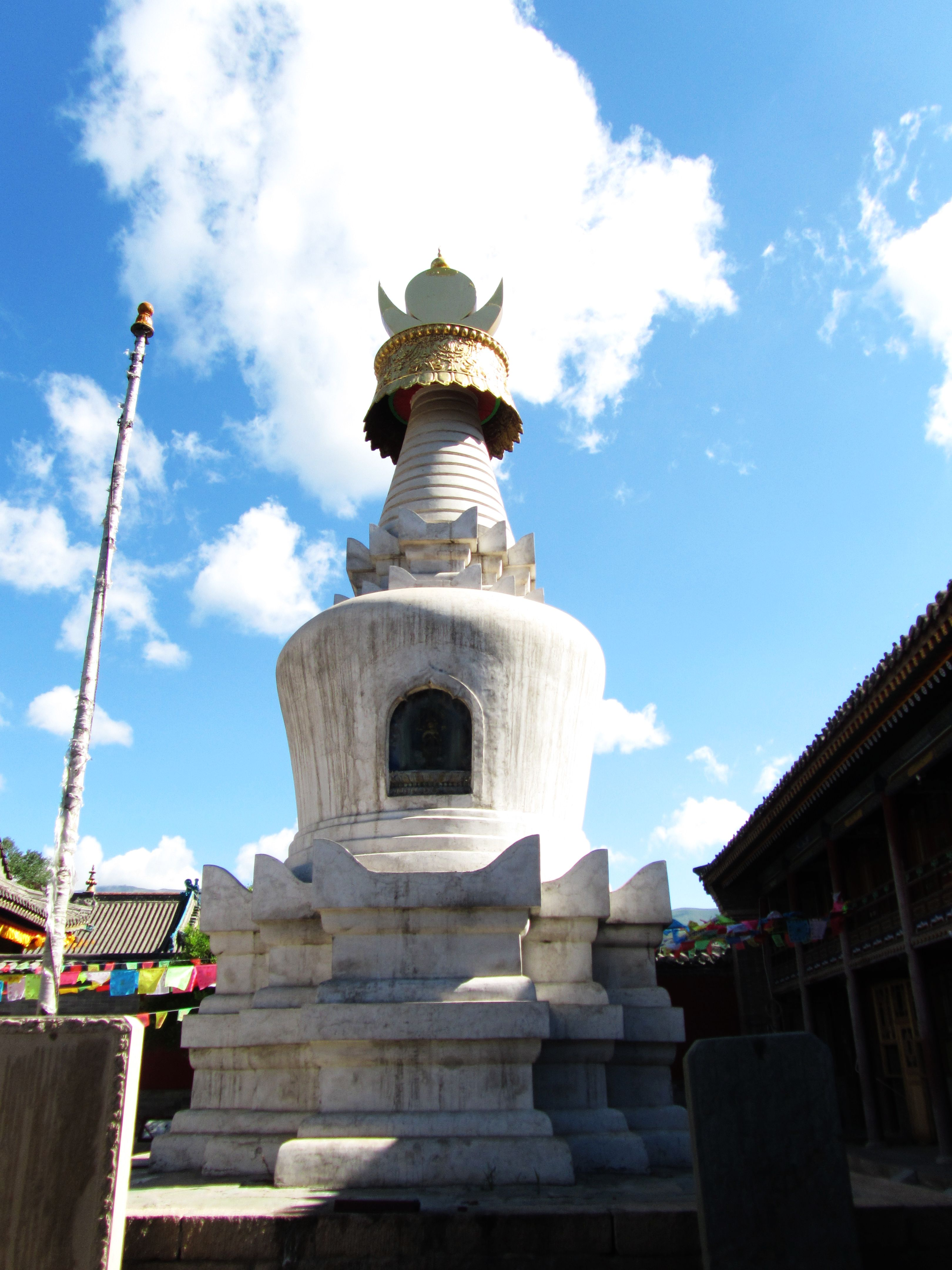
A White Pagoda in Luohou Temple.

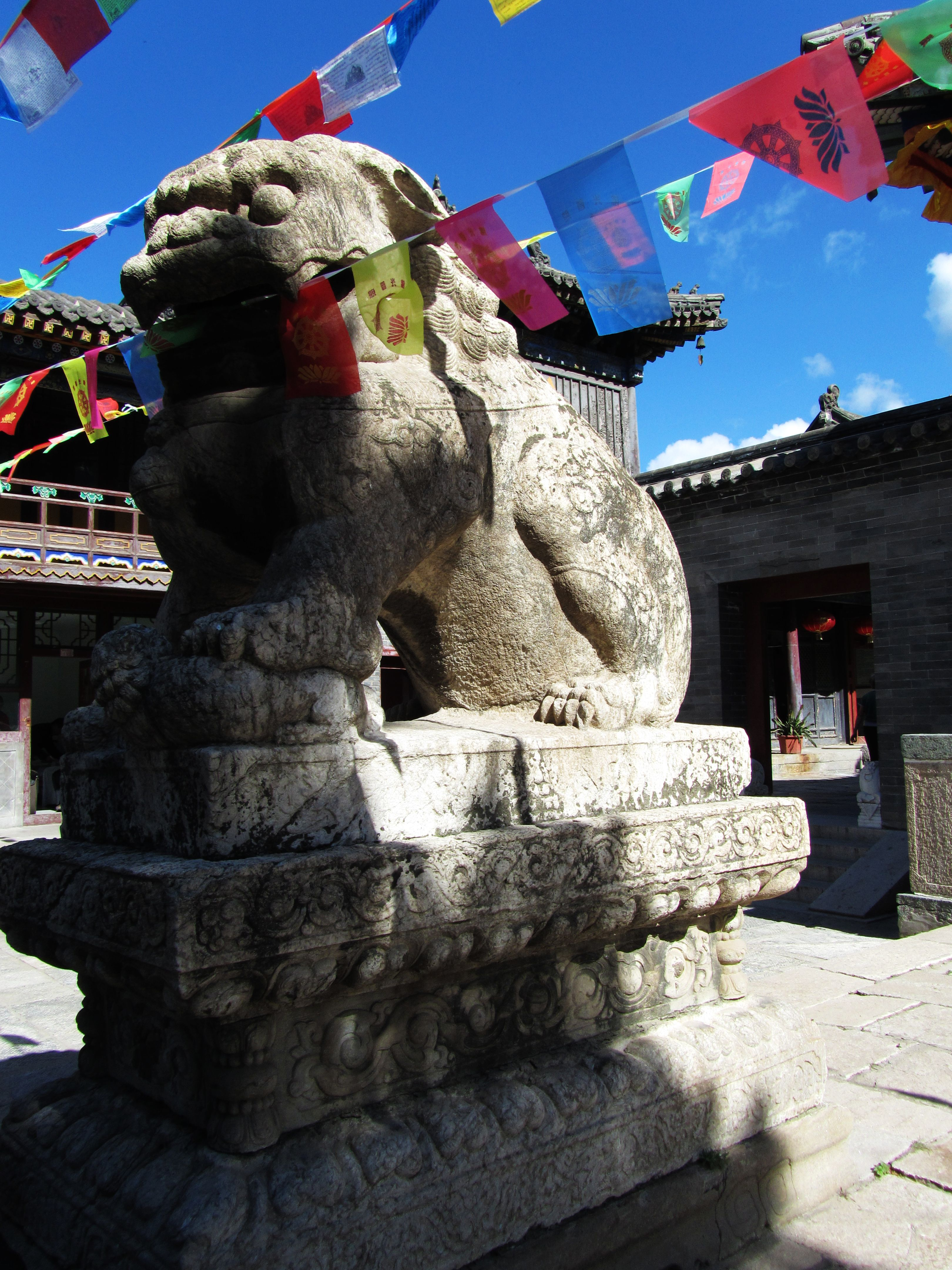
A Chinese guardian lion is placed in front of the Tianwang-dian.

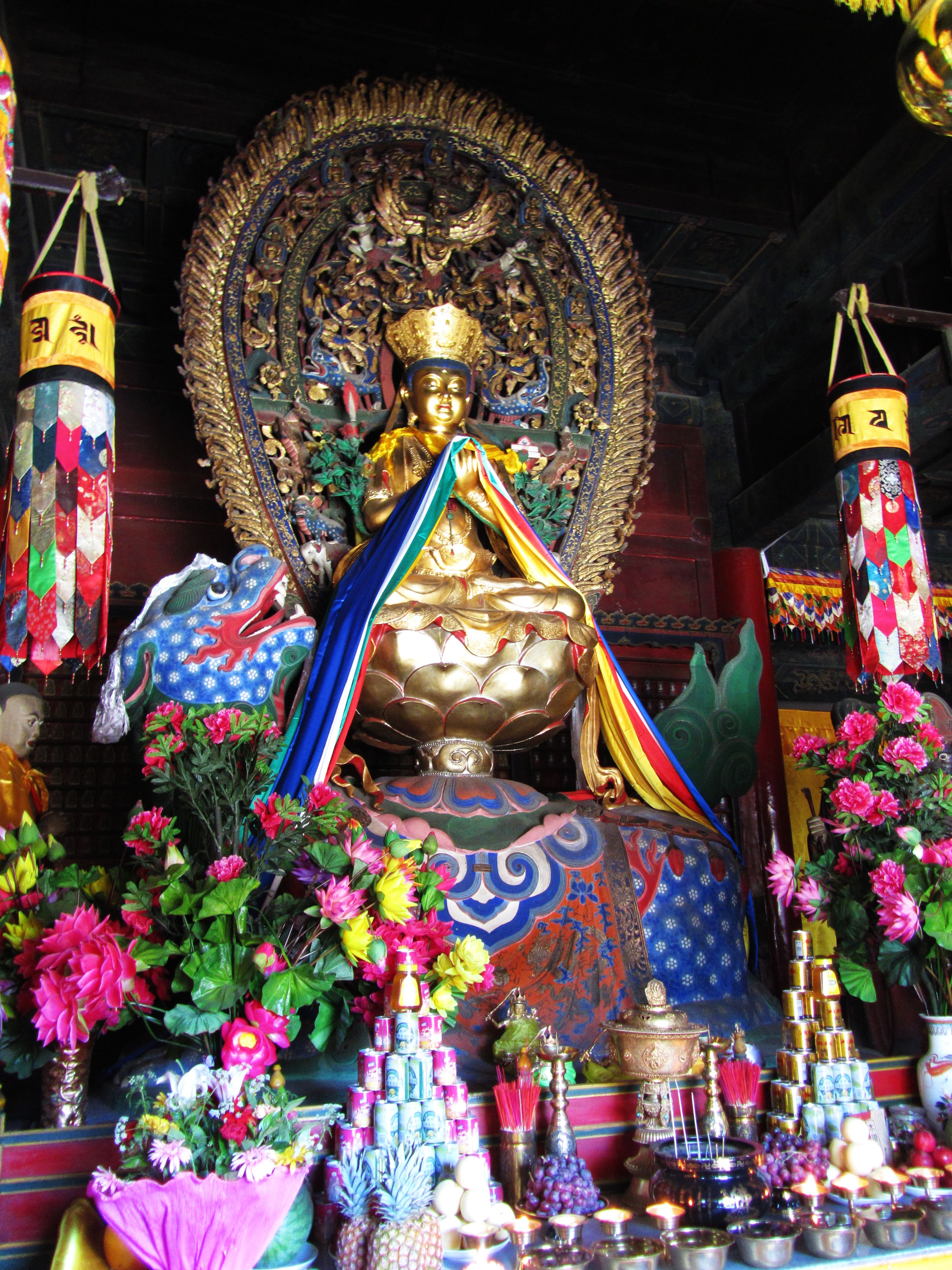
The Bodhisattva Wenshu .

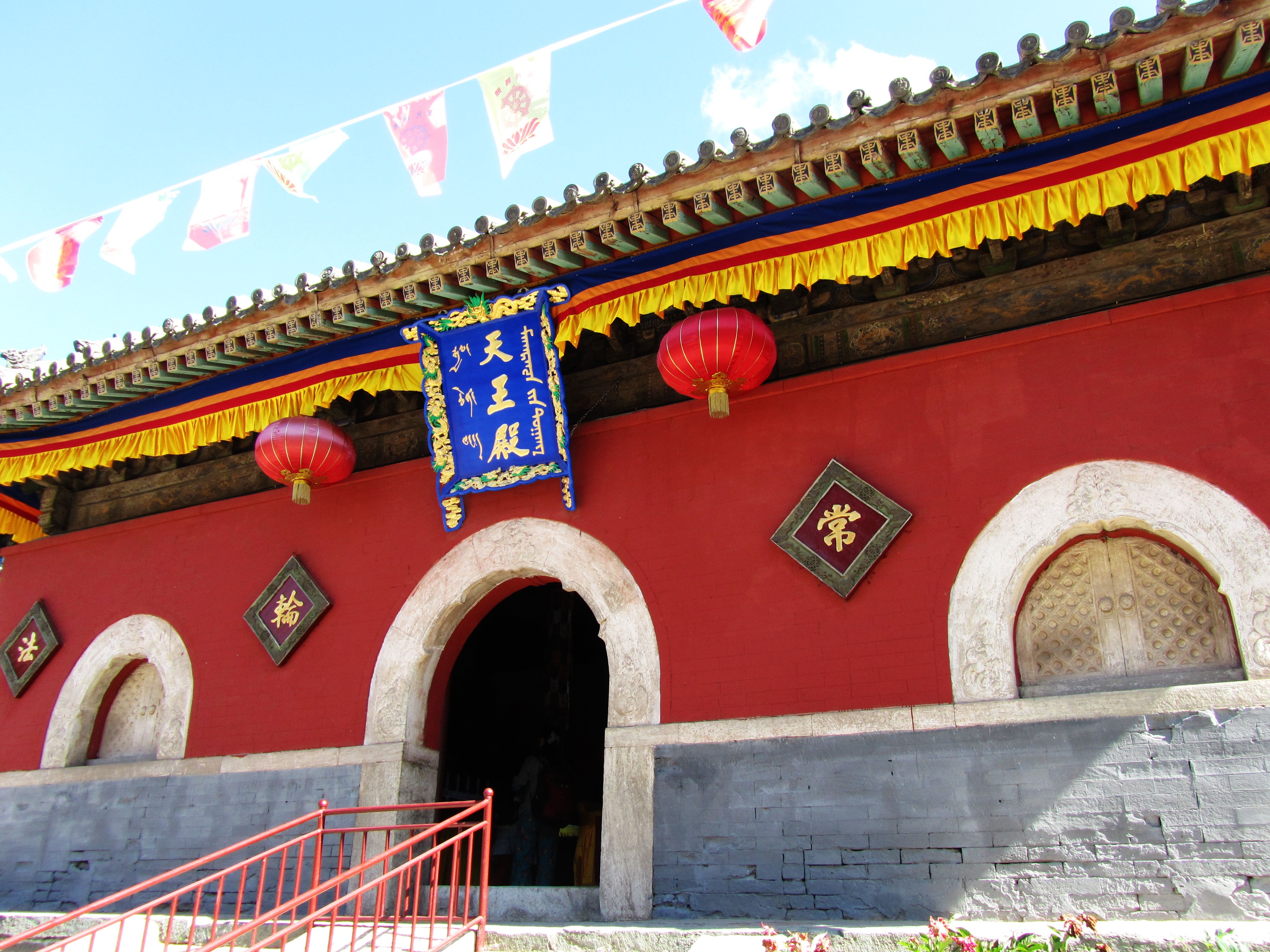
The Tianwang-dian at Luohou Temple.

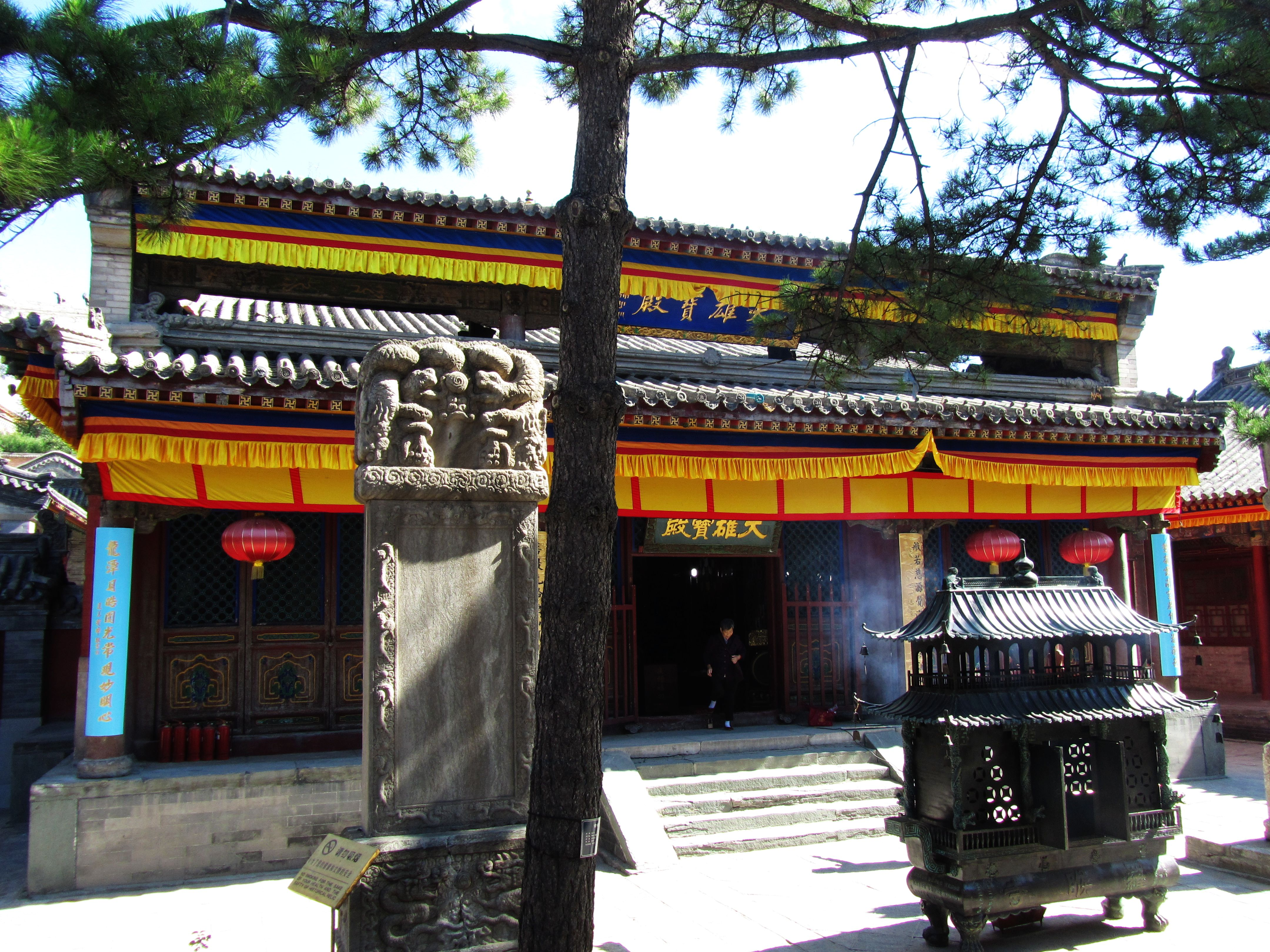
The Mahavira Hall at Luohou Temple.

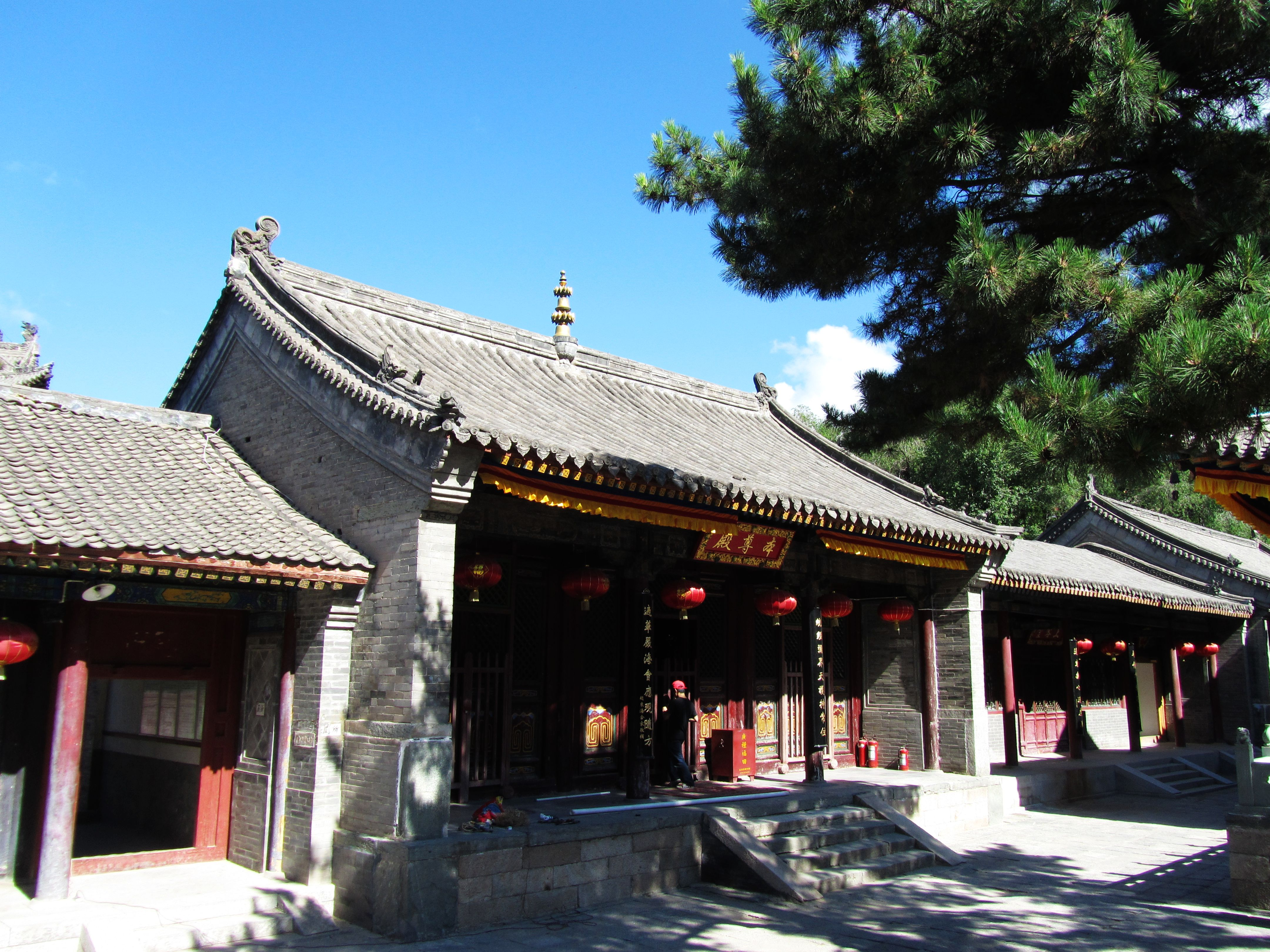
The Benzun Hall (本尊殿) at Luohou Temple.
