= Pusading =

Buddhist temple in Shanxi, China

- 菩萨顶
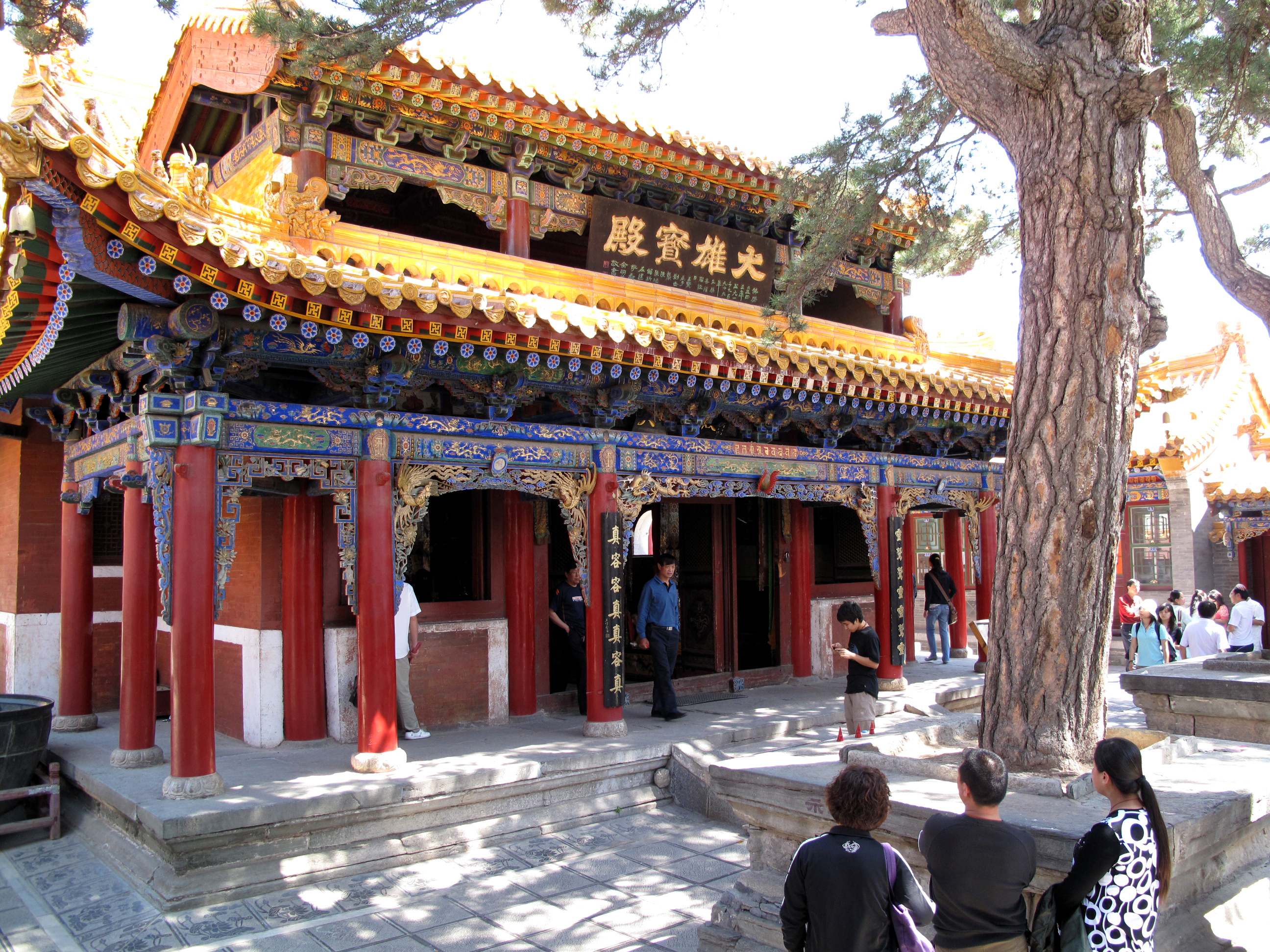
- The Mahavira Hall at Pusading

- Location within Shanxi

Religion
- Affiliation: Buddhism
- Sect: Gelug

Location
- Location: Taihuai, Wutai County, Shanxi
- Country: China
- Interactive map of Pusading
- Coordinates: 39°01′09″N 113°36′04″E

Architecture
- Style: Chinese architecture
- Established: Northern Wei (386–534)

The Pusading (simplified Chinese: 菩萨顶; traditional Chinese: 菩薩頂; pinyin: Púsàdǐng; lit. 'Bodhisattva Summit') is a Buddhist temple located in Taihuai Town of Wutai County, Shanxi, China. The temple structure is considered the best of all temples in Mount Wutai.

== History ==
The legend says that the bodhisattva Wenshu (Manjushri) revealed himself and preached at the summit of Mount Wutai, hence the name "Bodhisattva Summit Temple" (菩萨顶). It is also known as "Spiritual Black Eagle Peak" (灵鹫峰) due to its geographical position similar to the Lingjiu Peak described by Shijiamouni Buddha in the city of Rajgir northeast of the Kingdom of Magadha.

=== Northern Wei dynasty ===
Pusading was first established in the reign of Emperor Xiaowen of Northern Wei (467–499) in the Northern Wei (386–534) dynasty and initially called "Great Temple of Wenshu" (大文殊院).

=== Tang dynasty ===
In 631, in the 5th year of the Zhenguan period of the Tang dynasty (618–907), Buddhist monk Fayun (法云) rebuilt the temple and renamed it "Zhenrong Temple" (真容院).

=== Song dynasty ===
During the Jingde period (1004–1007) of the Northern Song dynasty (960–1127), Emperor Zhenzong (997–1022) bestowed a plaque with "Fengzhen Pavilion" (奉真阁) on the temple.

=== Ming dynasty ===
In the Yongle period (1403–1424) of the Ming dynasty (1368–1644), the Yongle Emperor changed the name to "Great Temple of Wenshu" (大文殊寺). In 1581, in the 9th year of the Wanli period, the temple was renovated by the government.

=== Qing dynasty ===
In 1656, in the 13th year of the Shunzhi period (1644–1661) of the Qing dynasty (1644–1912), the temple converted to Tibetan Buddhism. In 1683, in the 22nd year of the Kangxi period (1662–1722), with the Kangxi Emperor's permission, the roof of Pusading was tiled with yellow glazed tiles.

In June 1908, United States Ambassador to China William Woodville Rockhill and the 13th Dalai Lama talked about strengthening cooperation on the Government of British India and Government of Tibet issue in the temple.

=== Republic of China ===
In the spring of 1948, Chen Yi went to Xibaipo via Mount Wutai. He wrote a poem in praise of the beautiful scenery.

=== People's Republic of China ===
In 1983, the temple was classified as a "National Key Buddhist Temple in Han Chinese Area".

== Architecture ==
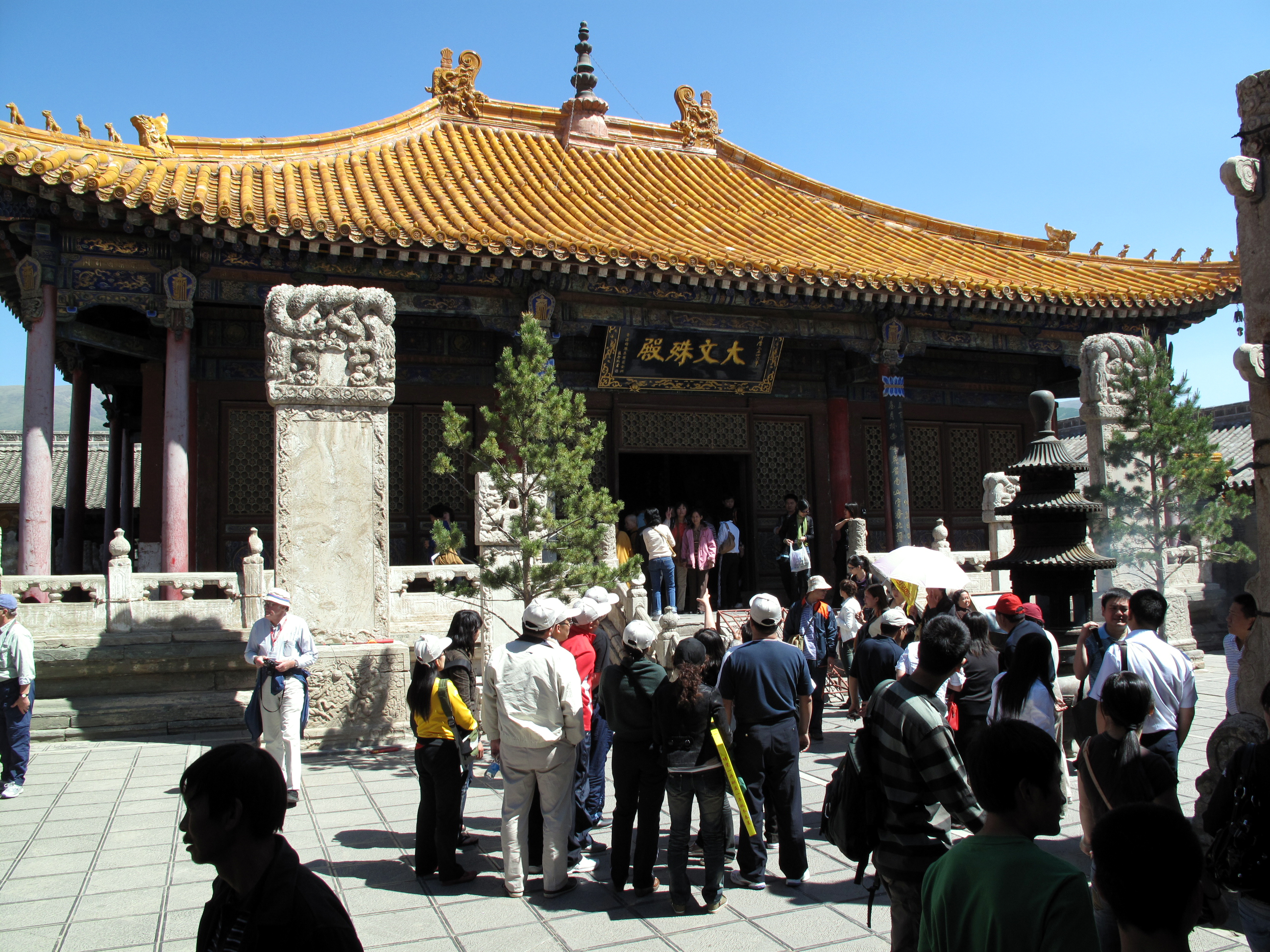
The Great Wenshu Hall

=== A walkway of 108 stone steps ===
A walkway of 108 stone steps leads to the summit as if it was a ladder to heaven from the temples below. It is said the 108 stone steps represent 108 worries of mankind, and one has to overcome them one step (one worry) at a time to see the true capacity of Buddha.

=== Paifang ===
Under the paifang of shanmen is a plaque with the Chinese characters "灵峰胜境" (灵峰胜境 means beautiful site of Lingjiu Peak) written by the Kangxi Emperor (1654–1722) in the Qing dynasty (1644–1912).

In front of the Wenshu Hall, a plaque with "五台圣境" (五台圣境 means beautiful site of Mount Wutai), written by the Kangxi Emperor (1654–1722) in the Qing dynasty (1644–1912), is hung on the stone paifang.
