= Lingfeng Temple =

Buddhist temple located in Taihuai Town of Wutai County, Xinzhou, Shanxi, China

- 灵峰寺
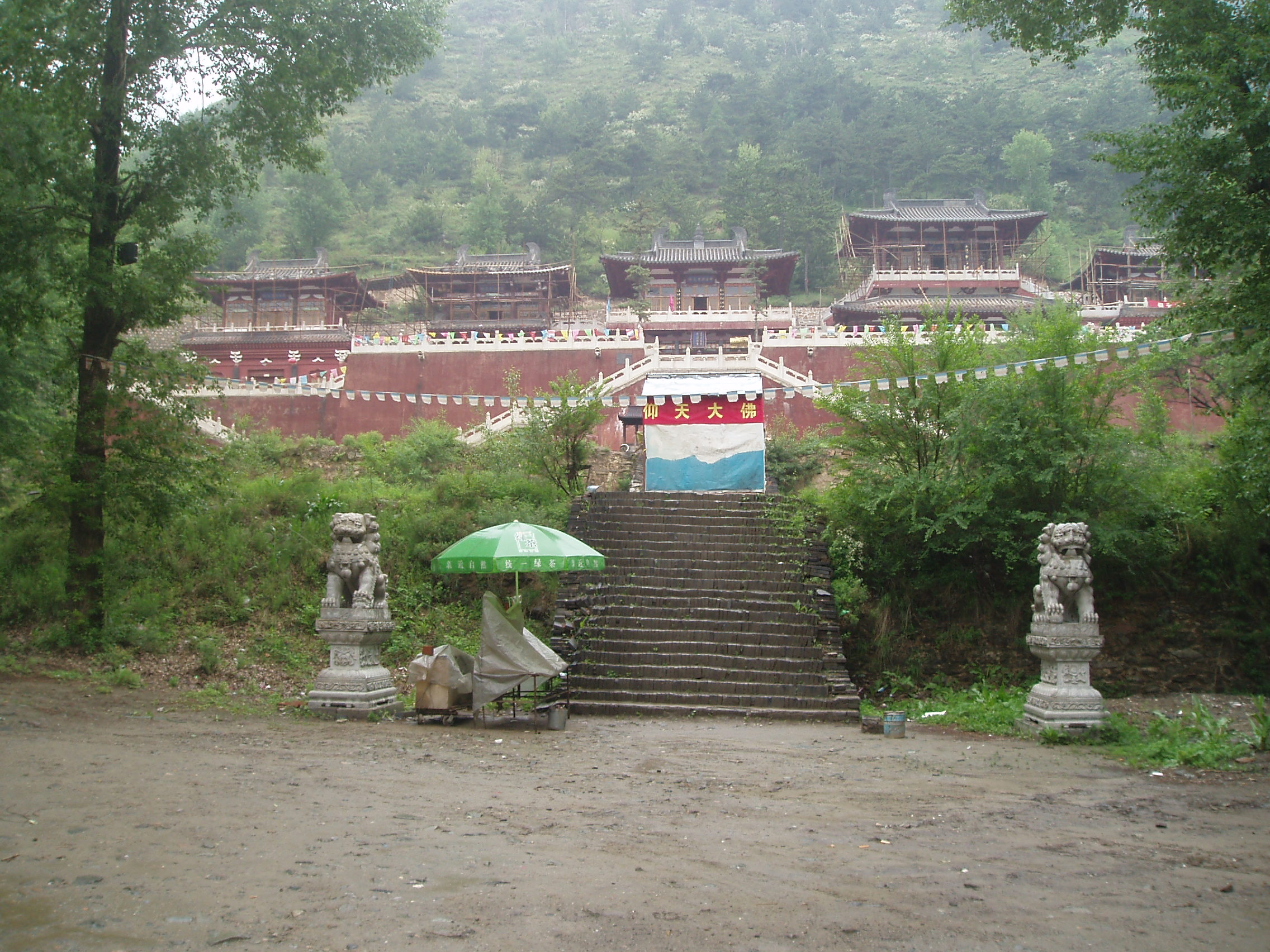
- Halls in Lingfeng Temple.

- Location within Shanxi

Religion
- Affiliation: Buddhism
- Prefecture: Wutai County
- Province: Shanxi

Location
- Country: China
- Interactive map of Lingfeng Temple
- Prefecture: Wutai County
- Coordinates: 38°59′58″N 113°35′29″E

Architecture
- Style: Chinese architecture
- Established: Tang dynasty (618-907)

Lingfeng Temple (simplified Chinese: 灵峰寺; traditional Chinese: 靈峰寺; pinyin: Língfēng Sì) is a Buddhist temple located in Taihuai Town of Wutai County, Xinzhou, Shanxi, China.

== History ==
The Lingfeng temple was first established in the Tang dynasty (618-907), rebuilt in the Chenghua period (1447-1487) of Ming dynasty (1368-1644), the modern temple was founded in 1998. In 1975, Lingfeng Temple was demolished due to the temple had fallen into a great state of disrepair.

== Architecture ==
=== Paifang ===
A paifang built of white marble in the front of the temple.

=== Stupa ===
A stupa is the oldest architecture in the temple. It is about 20 metres (66 ft) high and built of brick held together with clay mortar. The stupa was octagonal with five stories. The sumeru throne engraved patterns of Eight Heavenly Kings (Eight Diamond Kings). On the second floor, each side is carved with three Buddha statues. On the third floor, each side is carved with a Buddha statue. On the first floor, it is engraved with the words: "佛日圆照明古州和尚舍昨塔".

== Gallery ==
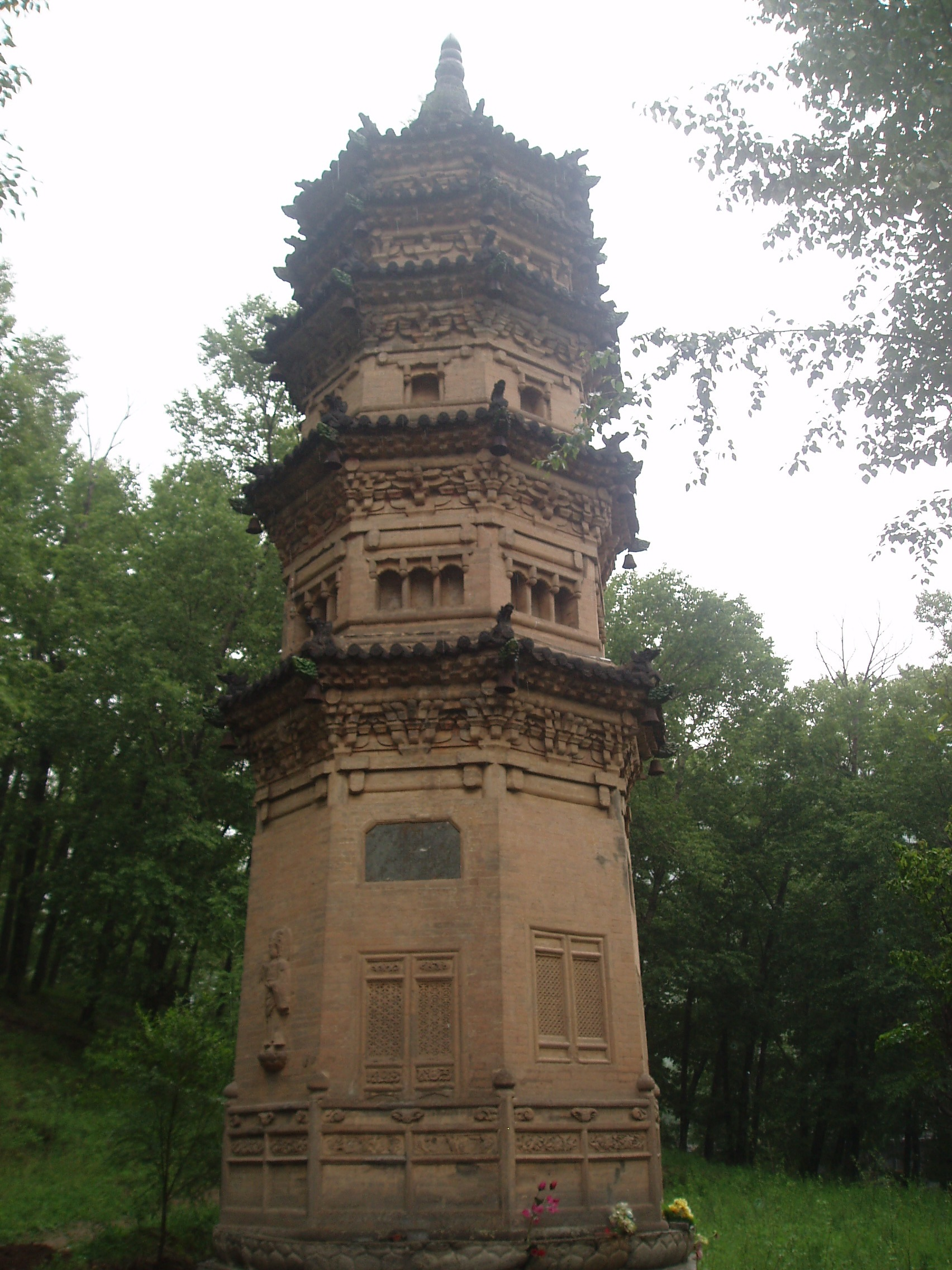
The stupa in the temple.

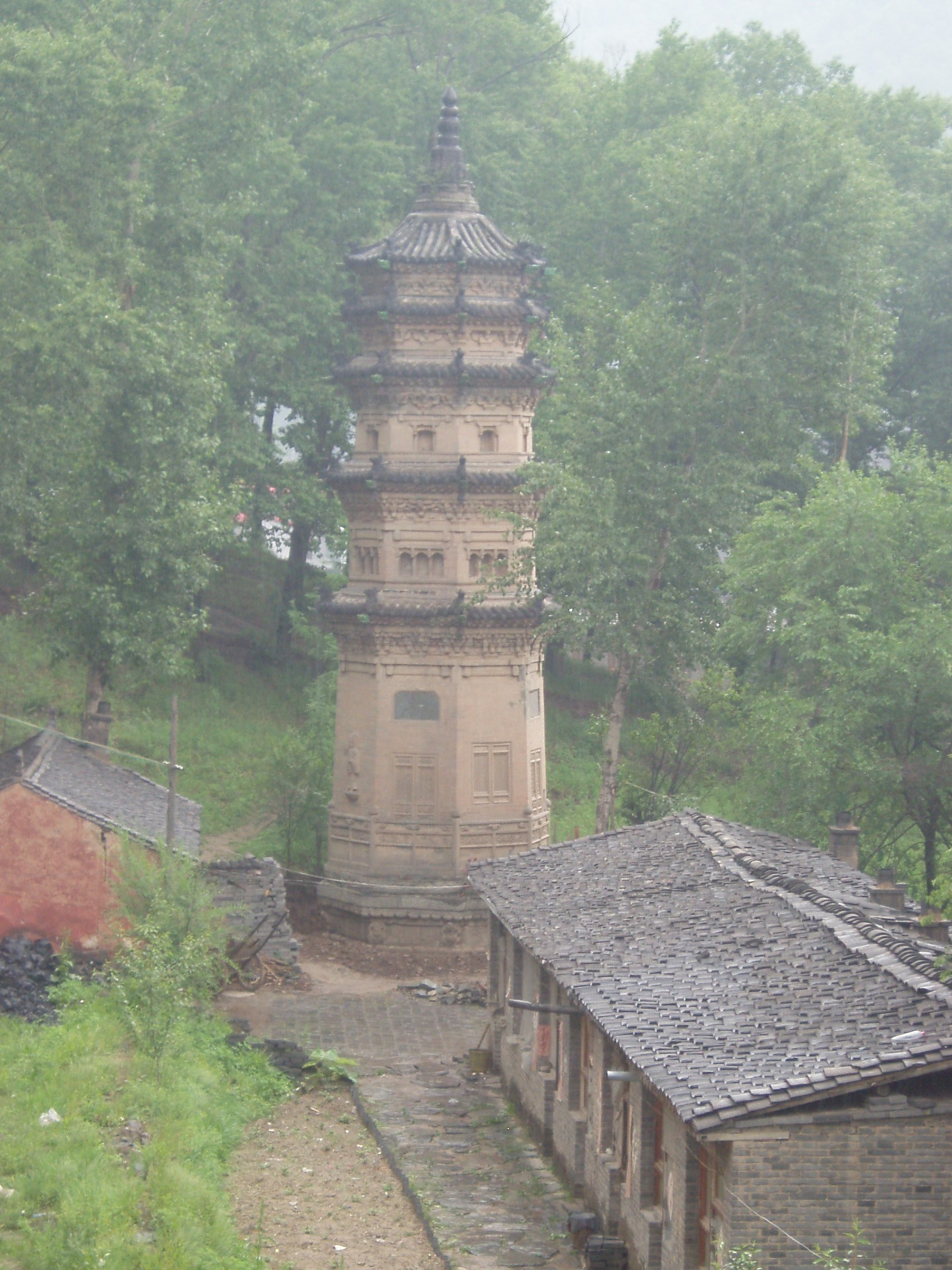
The stupa in the temple.
