= Great White Pagoda =

Stupa in Shanxi, China

Coordinates: 39.0080°N 113.5894°E

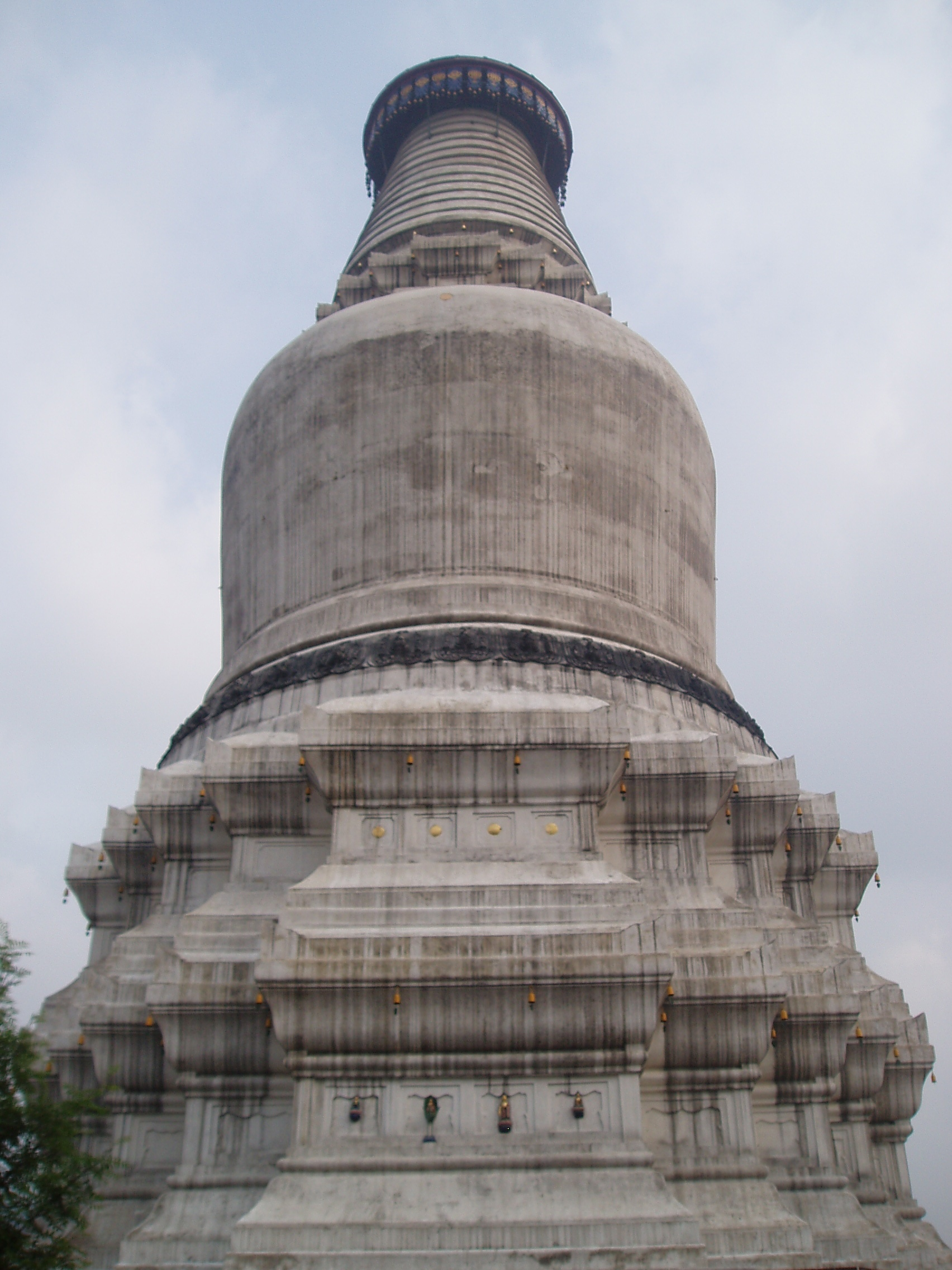
Sarira Stupa of Tayuan Temple

The Great White Pagoda (Chinese: 大白塔; pinyin: Dàbáitǎ), or Sarira Stupa of Tayuan Temple, is a brick stupa located at Mount Wutai of Wutai County, Shanxi province, China.

== History ==
The stupa was constructed during the Wanli reign of the Ming dynasty (1368–1644 AD), as recorded on a stone tablet there composed by the high minister Zhang Juzheng (1525–1582).

== Architectural features ==
The Sarira Stupa, named after the Sanskrit word sarira meaning 'Buddhist relic', sits on a square base with an archetypal sumeru pedestal. It is roughly 50 m (164 ft) tall, constructed of brick with a lime coating on the outside that gives its white color. The main upper frame of the stupa is shaped as an inverted bowl. The canopy of the stupa sits atop a steeple with thirteen tiers. The canopy and bead crowning the top are all made of gilded copper. The canopy also supports 252 small bells.
