= Xiantong Temple =

Buddhist temple in Shanxi, China

- 显通寺
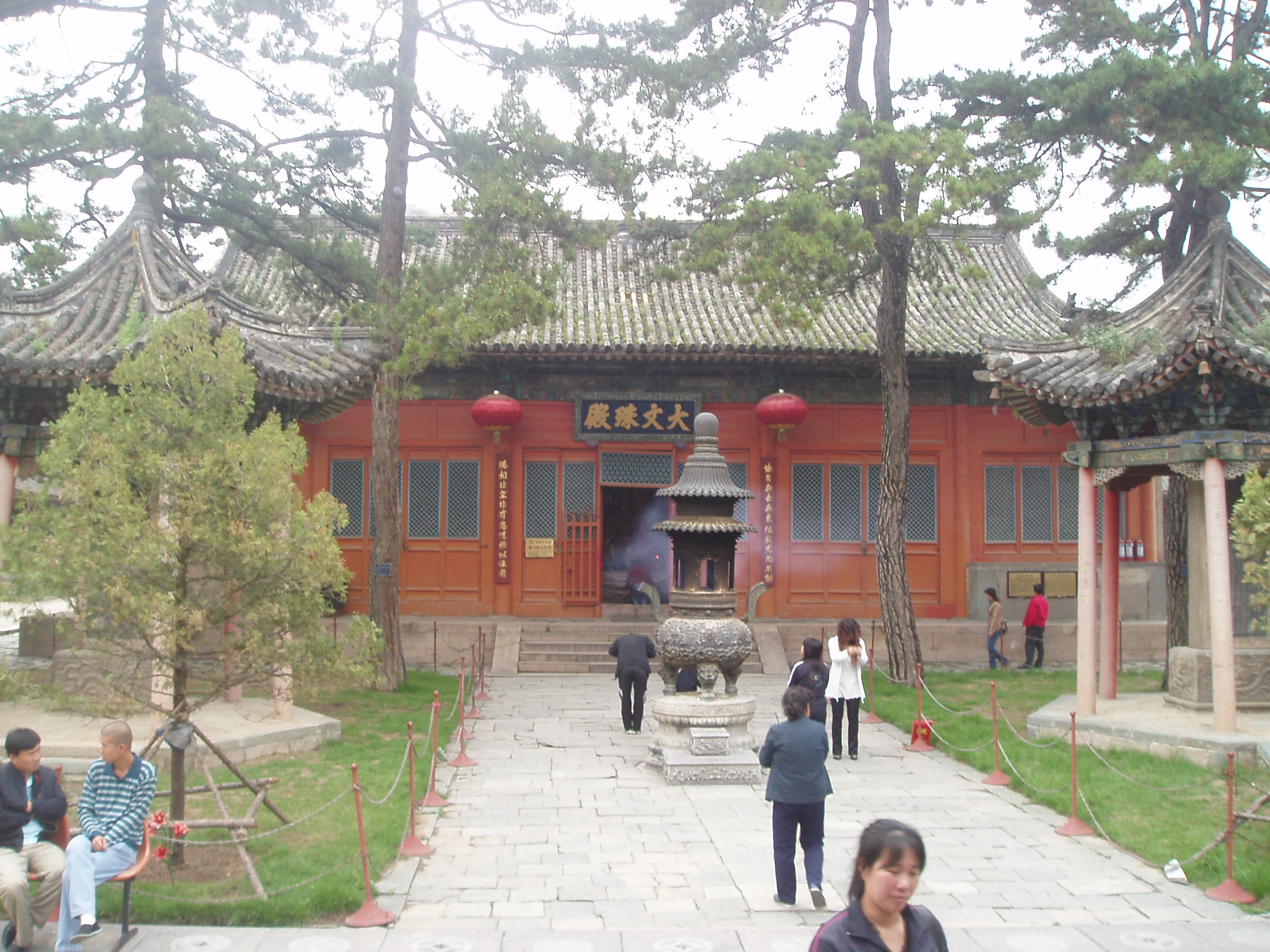
- The Hall of Great Manjusri at Xiantong Temple.

- Location within Shanxi

Religion
- Affiliation: Buddhism
- Year consecrated: 58～75

Location
- Location: Taihuai, Wutai County, Shanxi
- Country: China
- Coordinates: 39°00′34″N 113°35′21″E

Architecture
- Type: Chinese architecture

The Xiantong Temple (simplified Chinese: 显通寺; traditional Chinese: 顯通寺; pinyin: Xiǎntōng Sì) is a Buddhist temple located in Taihuai Town of Wutai County, Shanxi, China. The temple covers a total area of about 80,000 square metres (860,000 sq ft), it preserves the basic architectural pattern of the Ming and Qing dynasties (1368–1912). The temple has over 400 buildings and the seven main halls along the central axis are the Guanyin Hall, Great Manjusri Hall, Great Buddha Hall, Wuliang Hall, Qianbo Hall, Copper Hall and Buddhist Texts Library. Mount Wutai has 47 Buddhist temples, it is the largest Buddhist complex in China, Xiantong Temple is the largest one with the longest history.

== History ==
=== Eastern Han dynasty ===
Xiantong Temple is situated in the north of Taihuai Town of Mount Wutai in Shanxi. The temple was first established in the Yongping period (58–75) in the Eastern Han dynasty (25–220) and initially called "Dafu Lingjiu Temple" (大孚灵鹫寺).

=== Northern Wei dynasty ===
In the period of the Northern Wei dynasty (386–534), the temple was expanded and renamed as "Huayuan Temple" (花园寺).

=== Tang dynasty ===
The temple was reconstructed in the period of Emperor Taizong (599–649) of Tang dynasty (618–907) with the name of "Great Huayan Temple" (大华严寺).

=== Ming dynasty ===
In the period of Hongwu (1368–1398) in the early Ming dynasty (1368–1644), the temple was renovated and renamed "Great Xiantong Temple" (大显通寺). The name was changed to "Great Jixiang Xiantong Temple" (大吉祥显通寺) in the period of Yongle Emperor (1402–1424) and "Great Huguo Shengguang Yongming Temple" (大护国圣光永明寺) in the period of Wanli Emperor (1572–1620).

=== Qing dynasty ===
In 1687, in the period of the Kangxi Emperor (1661–1722) in the Qing dynasty (1644–1911), the temple was renamed as "Great Xiantong Temple" again.

=== People's Republic of China ===
After the establishment of PRC, the local government repaired the side halls. In 1957 the Amitabha Hall was restored. From 1974 to 1977, the West Chan Buddhism Hall was restored. In 1979, the Buddhist Texts Library was restored. In 1982, it was listed among the second group of "State Cultural Protection Relics Units" by the State Council of China. In 1983 it has been designated as a "National Key Buddhist Temple in Han Chinese Area". In 1984, the granary was restored. The Mahavira Hall was added to the temple in 2004.

== Architecture ==
The Xiantong temple consists of 400 buildings. The elegant colors with characteristics of the palace buildings reflect the precise layout and the rich and dignified style of the Ming and Qing dynasty (1368–1912).

=== Wuliang Hall ===
The brick Wuliang Hall (无量殿) is the fourth hall along the central axis of Xiantong Temple and gets its name from Amituofo (Vairocana Buddha; 大光明无量佛，又名毗卢佛) enshrined in it, as Wuliangshou Fo (“Buddha of Infinite Life”) is one of his epithets. It is also called "Beamless Hall" (无梁殿) since it is built with blue bricks without pillars or columns.

=== Qianbo Hall ===
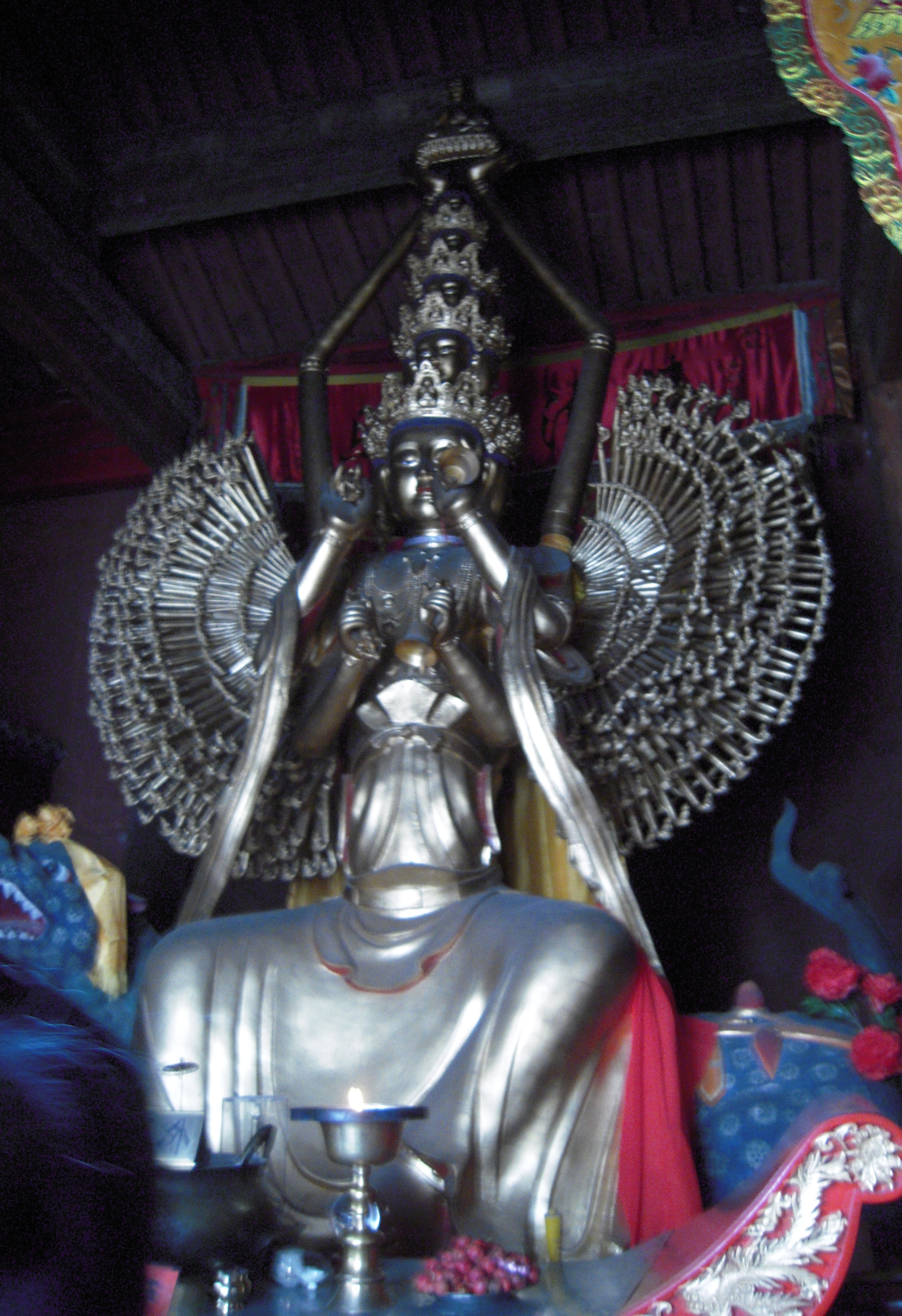
Statue of the Thousand-Armed and Thousand Bowl Wenshu in Qianbo Hall

The Qianbo Hall (千钵殿) is behind the Wuliang Hall. The hall was built for the enhrinement and worship of a Ming dynasty (1368–1644) copper statue of a manifestation of the bodhisattva Wenshu known as the Thousand-Armed and Thousand-Bowls Manjushri (千臂千缽文殊菩薩; Qiānbì Qiānbō Wénshū Púsà). The statue of Wenshu has five heads stacked and six hands in front, two of which hold a gold alms bowl in each. There is a sitting statue of Shijiamouni Buddha in the bowl. A thousand hands stretch from the back of the statue with gold alms bowls of a sitting statue of Shijiamouni Buddha in each hand.

=== Copper Hall ===
The pure copper made Copper Hall behind the Qianbo Hall is a rarer cultural relic in China. The hall is 8.3 m (27 ft) high, 4.7 m (15 ft) wide and 4.5 m (15 ft) deep. The plane of the hall is square, nine chi wide (1 chi=1/3 meter), eight chi deep and two zhang (1 zhang=10/3 meters). Though with two-story appearance, the hall is actually one story with a room, four pillars and drum-shaped column bases inside. Upper layer of Xiantong Temple is carved with six partition boards and the lower is with eight ones. Ten thousand of golden and spectacular small Buddha statues are carved on the walls of the hall. There are also exquisite and delicate color paintings and patterns of flowers, birds and animals engraved on the columns, architraves and partition boards. The Copper Hall was mentioned in Records of Qingliang Mountain (《清凉山志》), which read: "the Copper Hall was built by senior monk Miaofeng (妙峰法师) of Mount Wutai with 50,000 kg (110,000 lb) of copper in the period of Wanli Emperor (1573–1620) in the Ming dynasty (1368–1644)".

=== Long Toll Bell ===
The brass bell hanging in the Bell Tower in front of the temple was cast between 1621 and 1627 during the Ming dynasty (1368–1644) weighing 4,999.75 kilograms (11,022.6 lb). Outside of the bell cast over ten thousand words of Buddhist inscriptions. When the bell rings, the toll can be heard very far away. Therefore, it is called the "Long Toll Bell" (长鸣钟), also known as the "Longevity Bell" (长命钟) because in Chinese "long toll" and "longevity" have the same pronunciation.

== Gallery ==
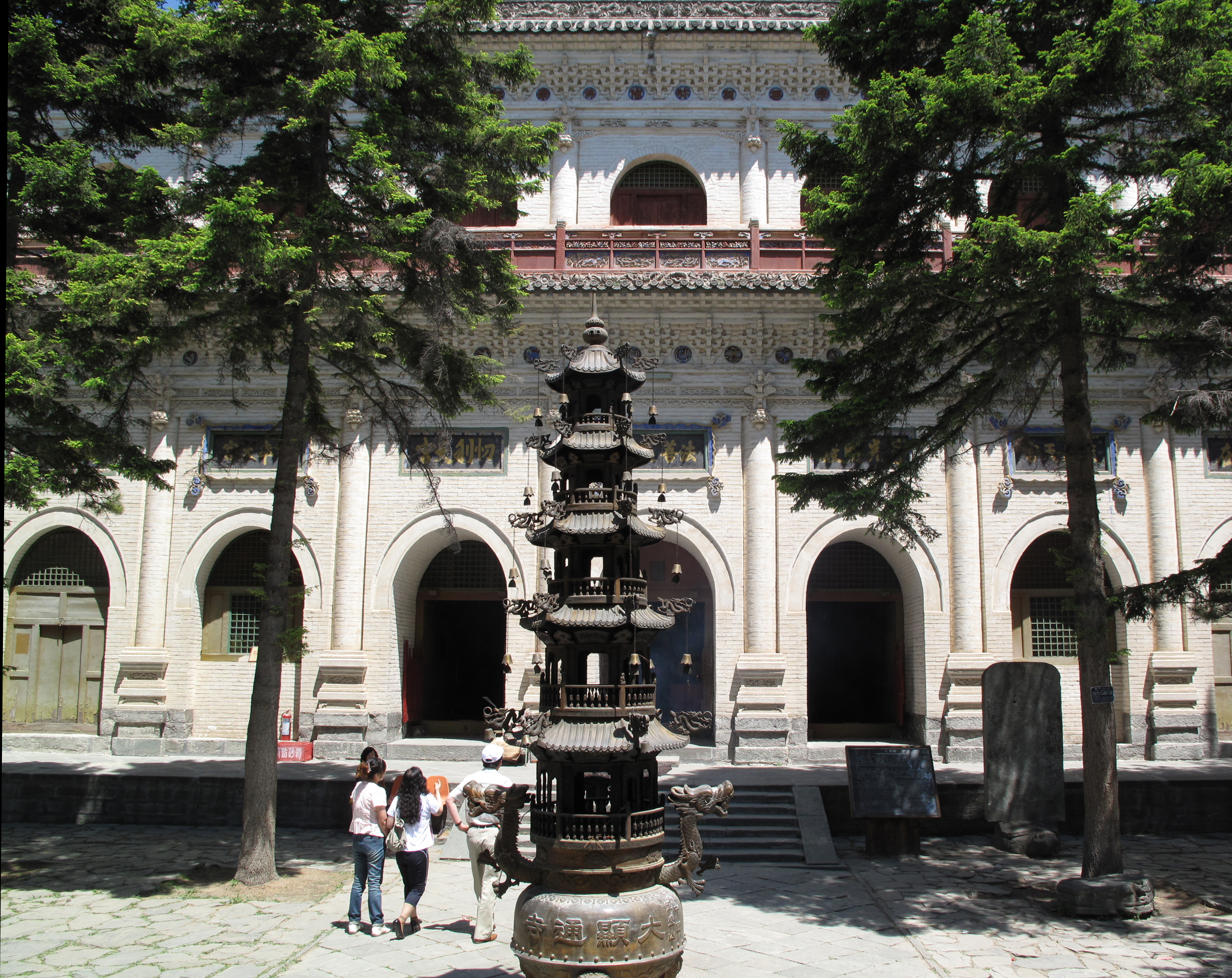
The Amitabha Hall, dedicated to the Buddha of the West, is unusual in that it is made of brick rather than wood. It is Ming dynasty in date. The interior of the hall features squinches and an octagonal coffered ceiling, whose base is supported by an imitation in brick of the traditional wooden dougong brackets.

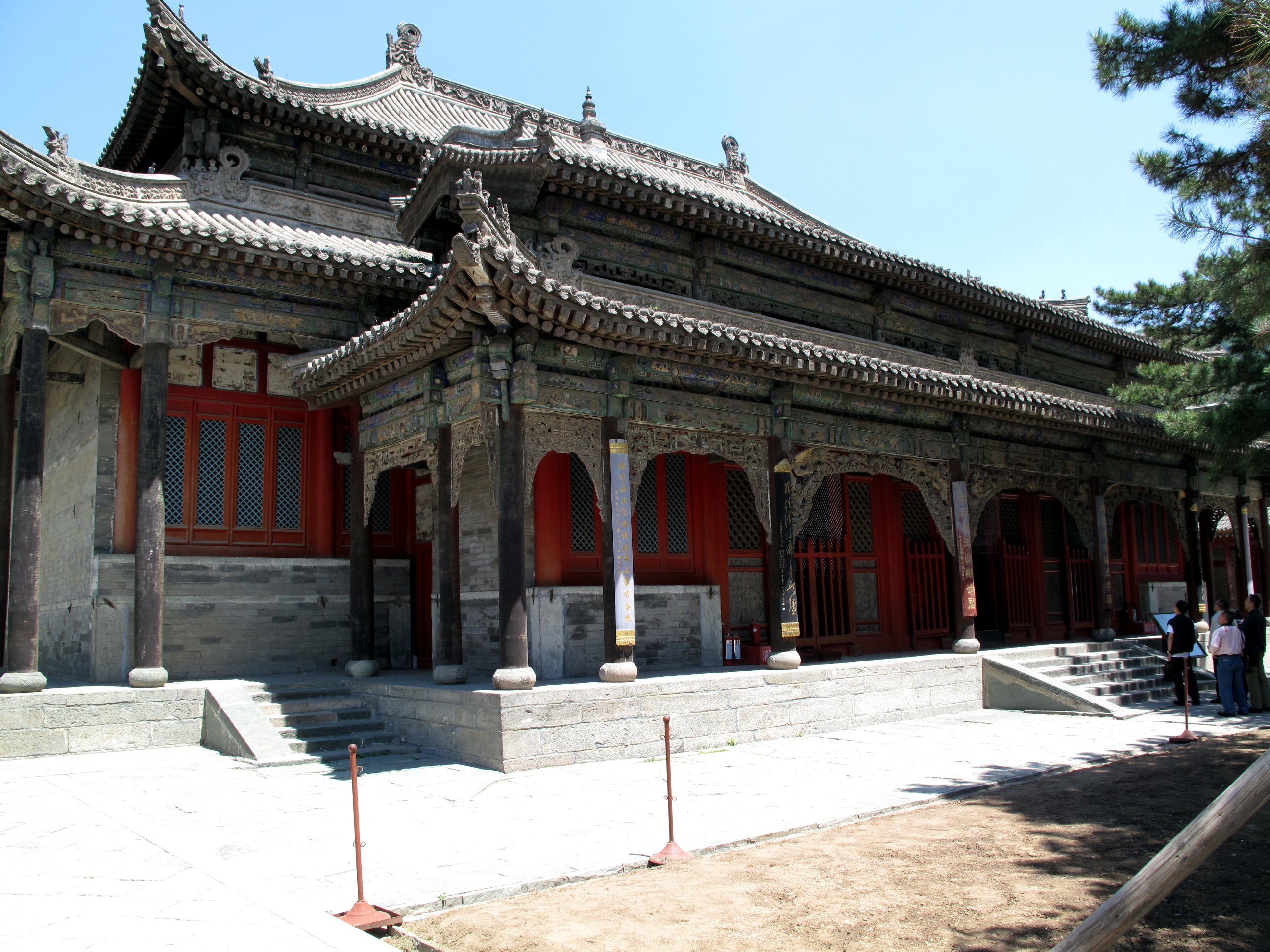
The large Mahavira Hall, dedicated to Shakyamuni, is roofed with multiple eaves; a long porch spreads along the front.

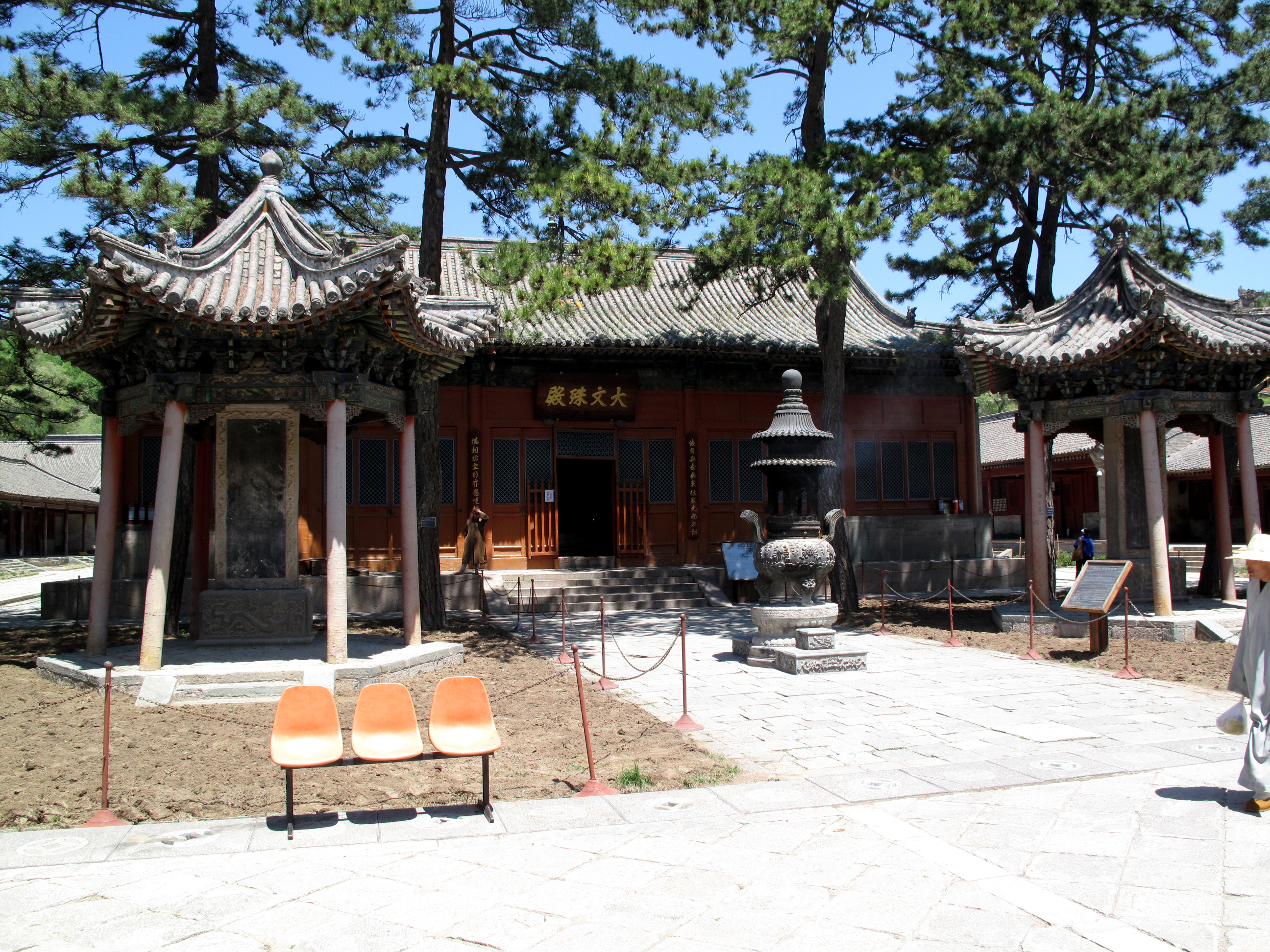
The Great Manjushri Hall, for the worship of Manjushri Buddha.

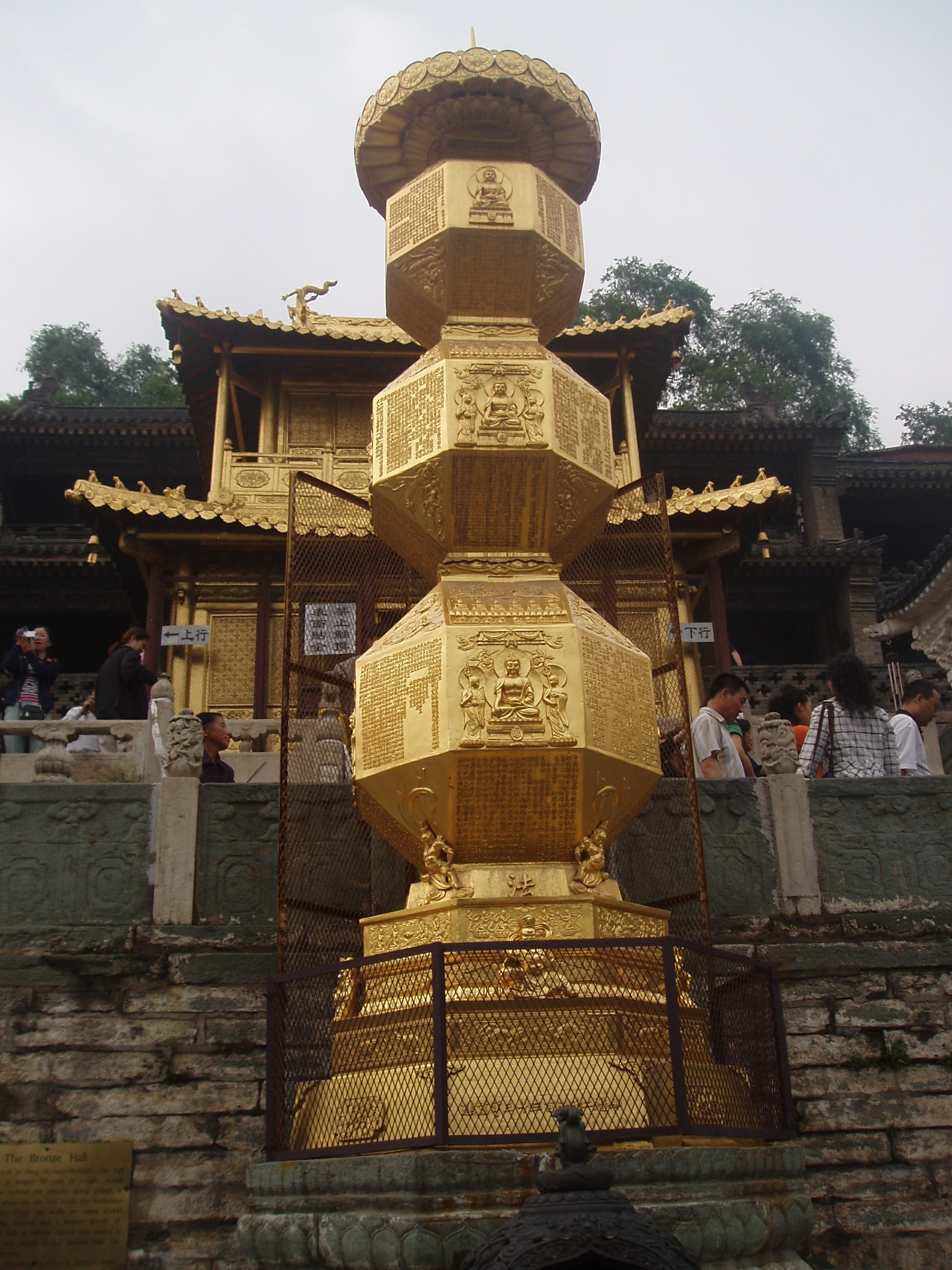
The Copper Hall, made of pure copper.

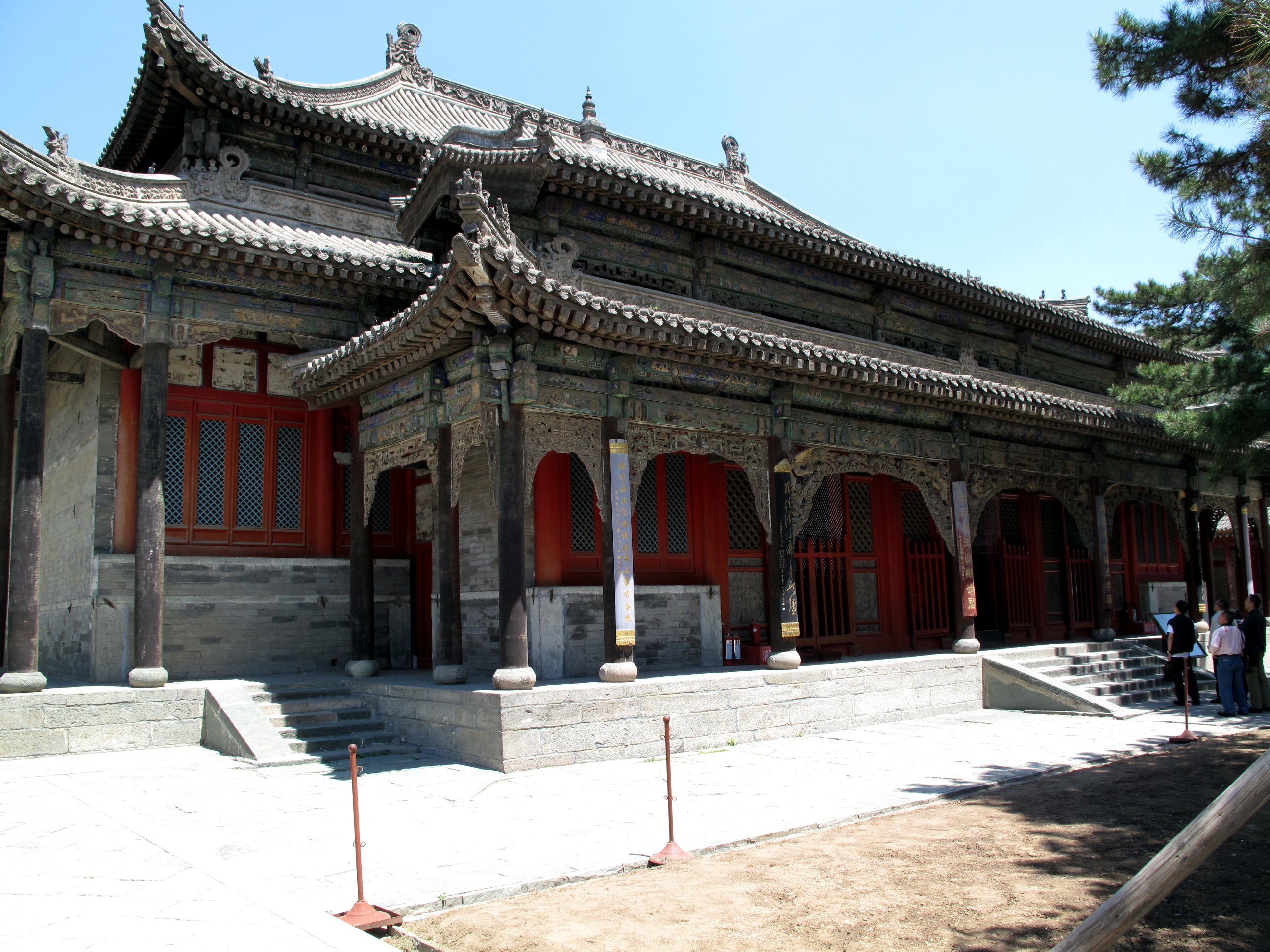
The Grand Hall.

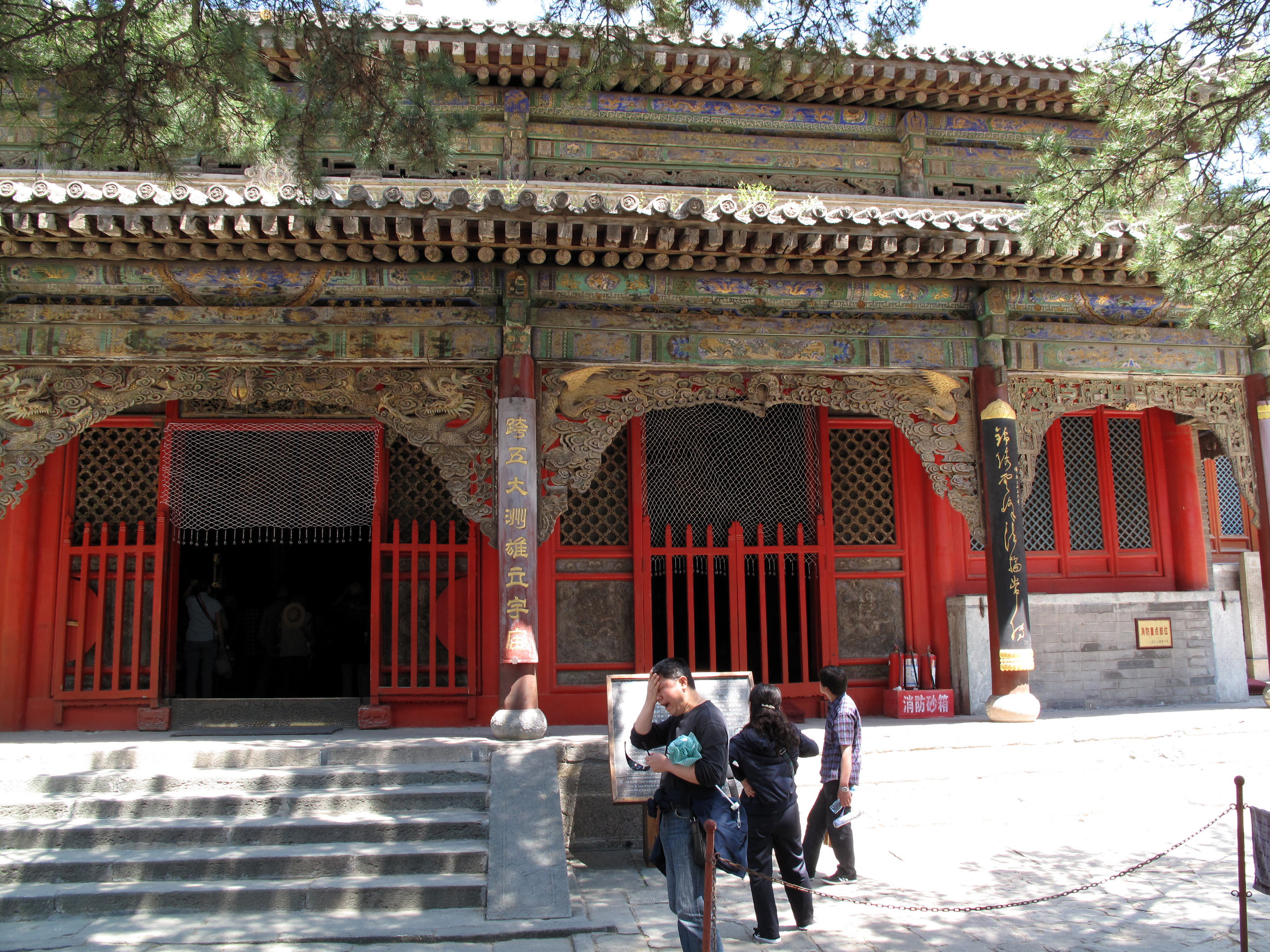
A closeup of the decoration on the Mahavira Hall.
