= Guangren Temple =

Tibetan Buddhist temple in Shaanxi, China

- 广仁寺
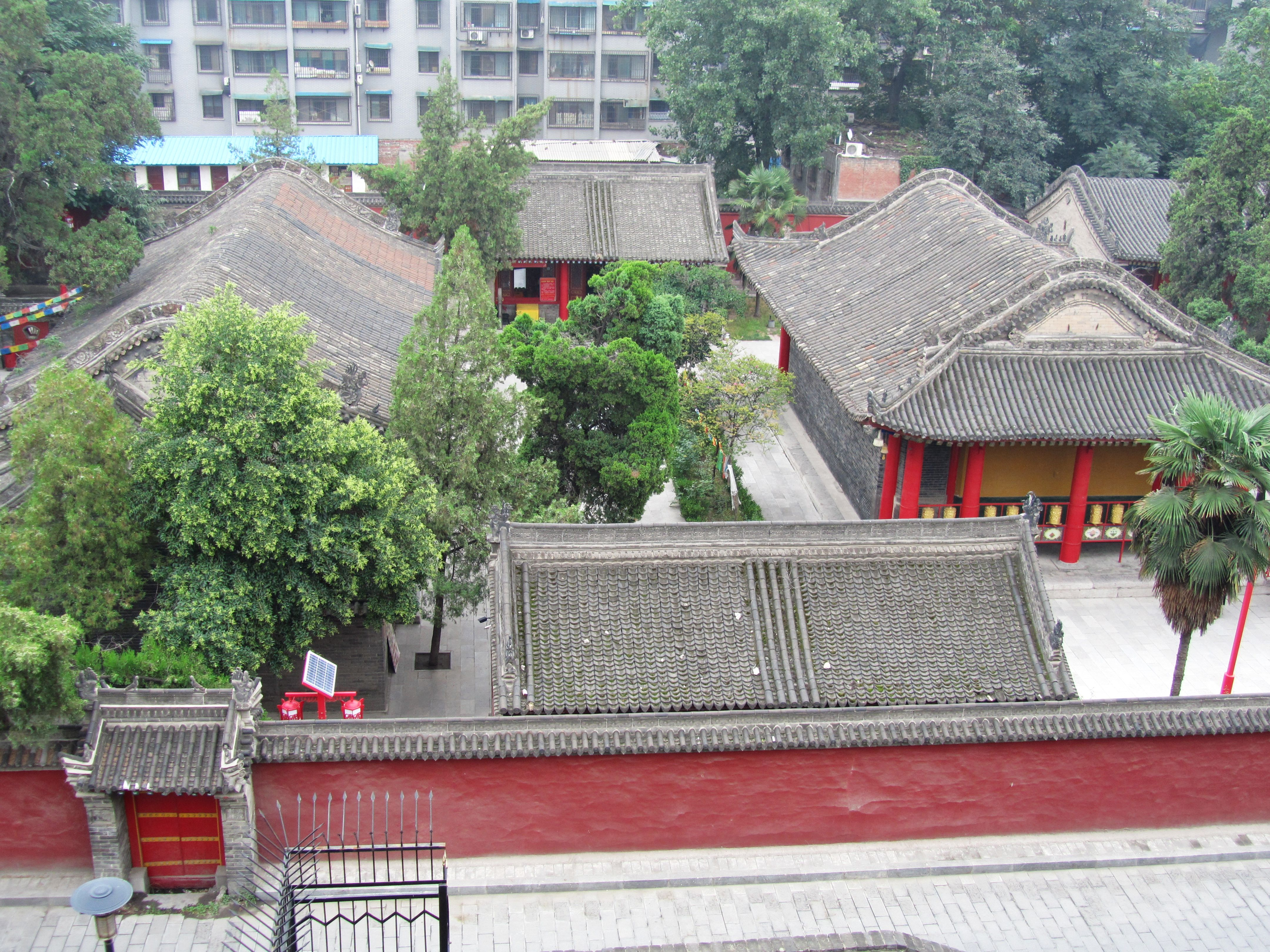
- Halls in Guangren Temple.

- Location within China

Religion
- Affiliation: Buddhism
- Sect: Gelugpa

Location
- Location: Lianhu District, Xi'an, Shaanxi
- Country: China
- Coordinates: 34°16′50″N 108°55′57″E

Architecture
- Style: Chinese architecture
- Founder: Kangxi Emperor
- Established: 1703
- Completed: 1705

Website
- www.guangrensi.com/html/index.html

Guangren Temple (simplified Chinese: 广仁寺; traditional Chinese: 廣仁寺; pinyin: Guǎngrén Sì), also called Guangren Lama Temple, is a Buddhist temple located in Lianhu District of Xi'an, Shaanxi, China. It is the only Tibetan Buddhist temple in Shaanxi.

== History ==
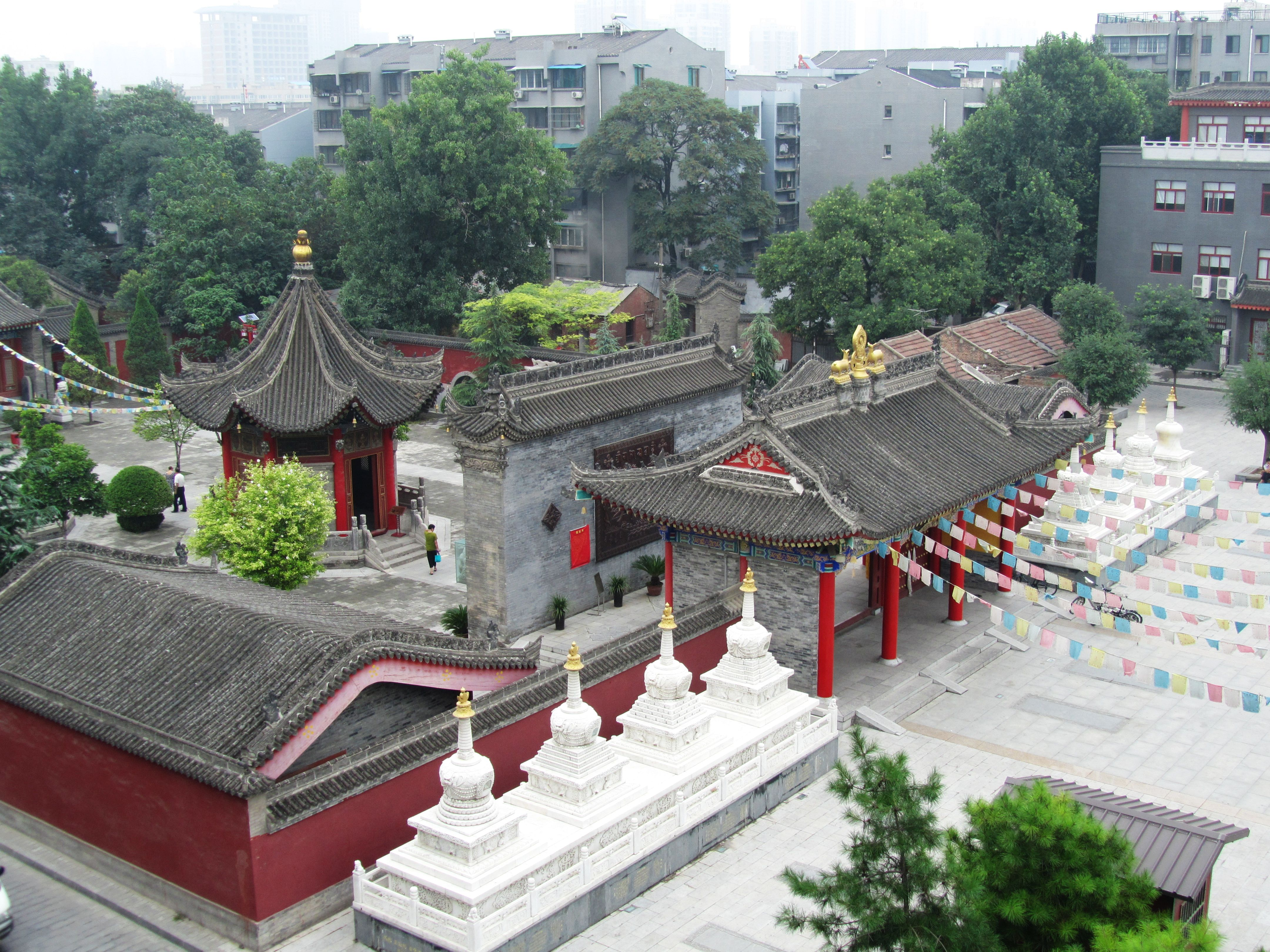
The Yingbi and Shanmen at Guangren Temple.

Construction of Guangren Temple began on the Kangxi Emperor's order in 1703 and was completed in 1705, the 44th year of the Kangxi era (1661–1722) of the Qing dynasty (1644–1911). During the Qing dynasty, many Tibetan Buddhist leaders traveled to Beijing to seek an audience with the emperor. The Qing court built this Tibetan Buddhist temple in Shaanxi to provide accommodation and a place for religious activities.

After the fall of the Qing dynasty in 1911, the temple was used as an office of the local government. In 1931, the bombs blew up the abbot's room, but soon it was reconstructed by Yang Hucheng.

In 1952, the temple was renovated and redecorated under the state financial allocation. In 1983, it was designated as a National Key Buddhist Temple in Han Chinese Area by the State Council of China.

== Architecture ==
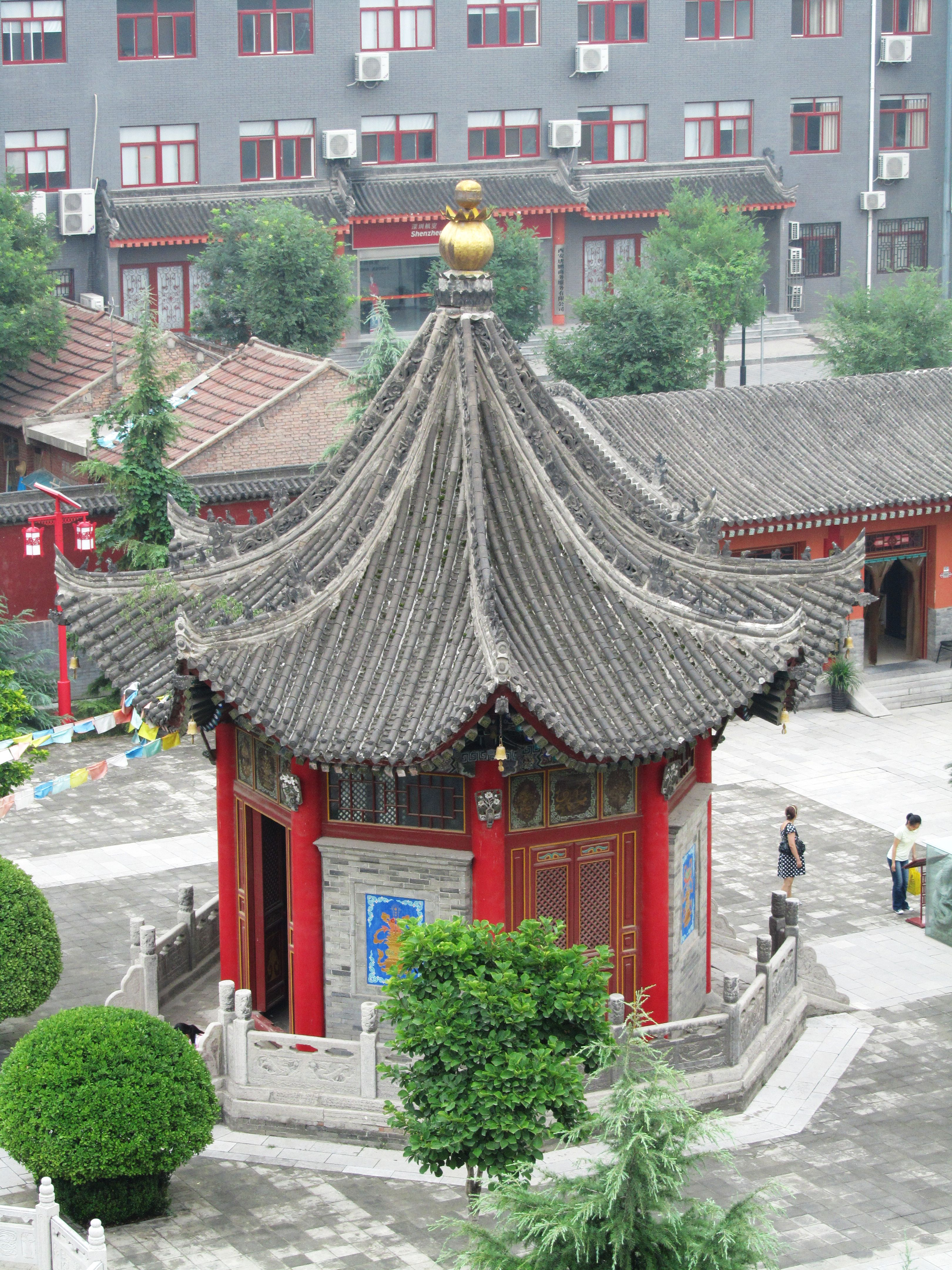
The Stele Pavilion (御碑亭) at Guangren Temple.

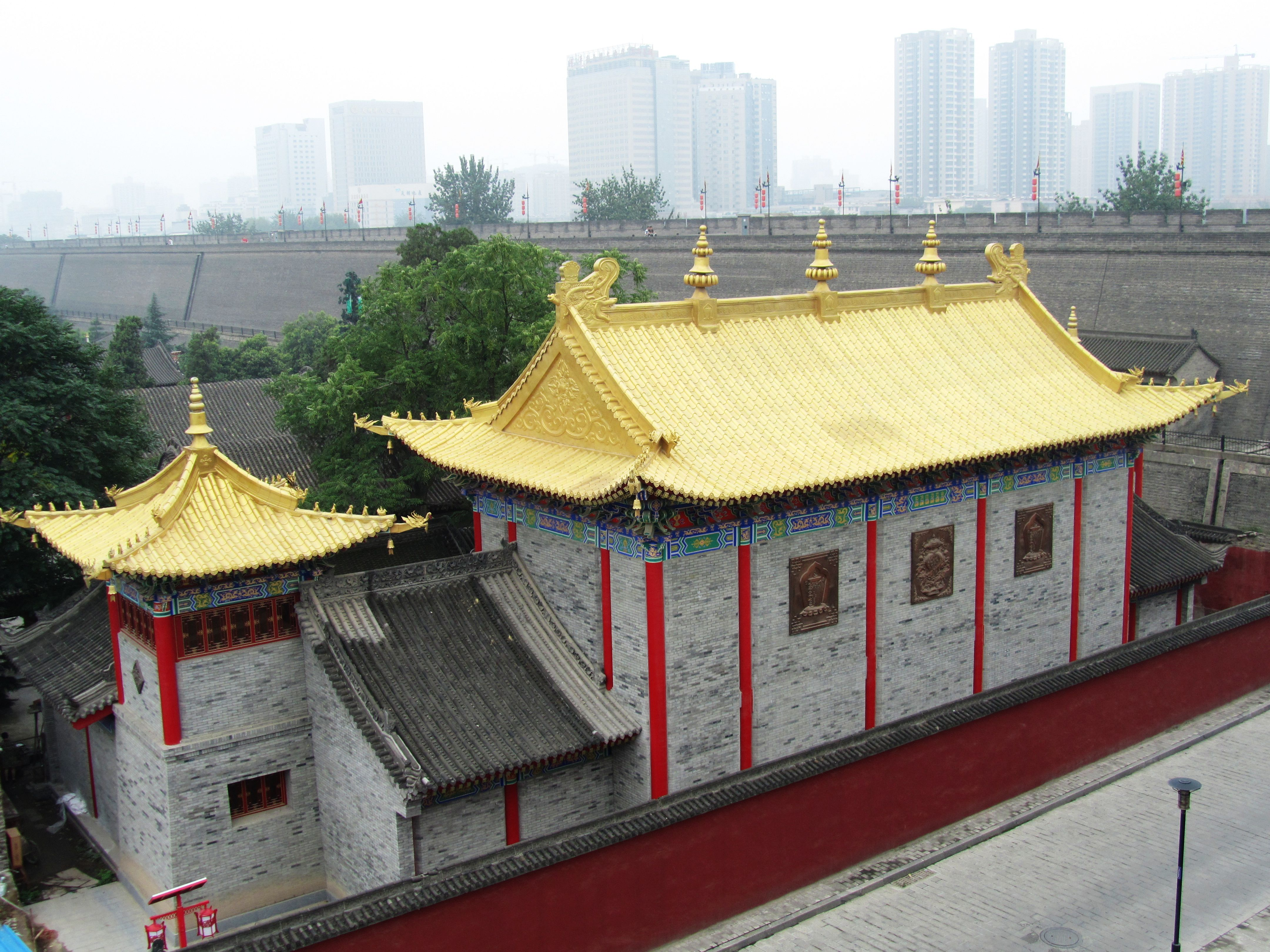
The Buddhist Texts Library at Guangren Temple.

The entire temple faces south with the Shanmen, Four Heavenly Kings Hall, Changshou Hall (长寿殿), Hufa Jingang Hall (护法金刚殿), Main Hall, Reception Room, Hall of the God of Wealth, Thousand Buddha Hall, Buddhist Texts Library, and Mahavira Hall along the central axis of the complex.

=== Shanmen ===
Under the eaves is a plaque with the Chinese characters "Guangren Temple" written by Kangxi Emperor in the Qing dynasty (1644–1911). Statue of "Two Deer Listening to Sutras" on the roof of Shanmen. "Two Deer Listening to Sutras" is a symbol of the construction of Tibetan Buddhist temples, which comes from the story that two deer were attracted to listen to sutras dedicatedly when Sakyamuni made his first teaching in Migadaye.

=== Yingbi ===
The Yingbi is 6 metres (20 ft) high, 10 metres (33 ft) wide and 1 metre (3 ft 3 in) thick. The Eighteen Arhats were carved in the Yingbi.

=== Guanyin Hall ===
The Guanyin Hall is 9.7 metres (32 ft) wide and 6.8 metres (22 ft) deep with single eave gable and hip roof (单檐歇山顶). In the center of the eaves of the hall is a plaque, on which there are the words "Guangren Temple", written by Zhao Puchu, the former Venerable Master of the Buddhist Association of China. In the middle of the hall placed the statue of Thousand Handed and Eyed Guanyin, with statues of Maitreya Buddha, Skanda and Four Heavenly Kings on the left and right sides.

=== Hufa Jingang Hall ===
The Hufa Jingang Hall (护法金刚殿) houses statues of Yamantaka, Mahakala, Yama Dharmaraja, and Palden Lhamo.

=== Changshou Hall ===
The Changshou Hall enshrining the statues of Amitayus. Statue of White Tara is placed on the northwest corner, statues of Bhaisajyaguru and Ksitigarbha are placed on the north corner, statue of Ushnisha Vijaya is placed on the southwest corner, and statues of Four Armed Guanyin and Akashagarbha are placed on the south corner. In front of the hall, a wooden plaque with Chinese characters "庄严佛土; zhuāngyán fú tǔ" written by Kang Youwei in 1923 is hung on the eaves.

=== Green Tara Hall ===
The Green Tara Hall is the second main hall of the temple. In the middle is Green Tara; statues of Manjushri and Samantabhadra stand to the left and right of the Green Tara statue. A plaque with Chinese characters "慈云西荫; cíyún xī yìn" written by Kangxi Emperor is hung on the eaves. A plaque with Chinese characters "永照法轮寺; yǒng zhào fǎlún sì" written by vice-president of the Buddhist Association of China Jamyang Tubudan is hung on its west.

=== Thousand Buddha Hall ===
Inside the hall, statues of Je Tsongkhapa and his disciples Goshir Gyaltsab and Khedrup Gelek Pelzang, 1st Panchen Lama are enshrined in the hall. In the interior walls thousand miniature gilded bronze statues of Tsongkhapa are inlaid in the baldachines. The pillars inside the hall are engraved with the Four Bodhisattvas, namely Manjushri, Samantabhadra, Guanyin and Ksitigarbha. The door pillars are also engraved with four Bodhistattvas: Akashagarbha, Nivaranaviskambin, Vajrapani and Maitreya.

=== Buddhist Texts Library ===
The roof of the Buddhist Texts Library is covered with golden tiles, which symbolized the highest position of the Tibetan Buddhism. In the middle of the hall, the full-length statue of 12-year-old Sakyamuni about 1.5 metres (4 ft 11 in) tall is enshrined lively and vividly with a plump posture. A 2,500-year history lotus throne is placed in the hall, which came from ancient India and housed in Kaiyuan previously. Under the eaves a plaque with "佛教圣地; 'Buddhist Holy Land'" written by Qianlong Emperor is hung on the architrave.

== National treasure ==
The Buddhist Texts Library now stores 6,600 volumes of Prajnaparamita sutras which were awarded by Kangxi Emperor in the Qing dynasty (1644–1911).
