= Mimi (given name) =

Mimi is a feminine given name and a shorter form (hypocorism) of the given names Michelle, Miriam, María, Mercy or Mary.

- Mimi Aguglia (1884–1970), Italian actress
- Mimi Ajzenstadt (born 1956), Israeli criminologist; President of the Open University of Israel
- Mimí Ardú (born 1956), Argentine actress
- Mimi Benzell (1924–1970), American soprano
- Mimi Berdal (born 1959), Norwegian lawyer and businessperson
- Maria Francisca Bia (1809–1889), Dutch actress called Mimi
- Mimi Cazort (1930–2014), Canadian gallery curator and author
- Mimi Chakib (1913–1983), Egyptian actress
- Mimi Chakraborty (born 1989), Bengali film and television actress
- Mimi Choi, Macau-born Canadian makeup artist
- Mimi Coertse (1932–2026), South African operatic soprano
- Mimi Dietrich, American quilter and writer
- Mimi Fariña (1945–2001), American singer-songwriter, sister of Joan Baez
- Mimi Fawaz, Nigerian-Lebanese journalist
- Mimi Fox, American jazz guitarist
- Mimi Freedman, American documentary filmmaker
- Mimi Frellsen (1830–1914), Norwegian photographer
- Mimi Gardner Gates (born 1943), American art historian
- Mimi Gianopulos, American actress
- Mimi Gibson (born 1948), American former child actress
- Mimi Goese, American musician, former vocalist for the band Hugo Largo
- Mimi Gross (born 1940), American artist
- Mimi Gurbst, American television news producer
- Mimi Haas, American billionaire businesswoman
- Mimi Heinrich (1936–2017), Danish actress and writer
- Mimi Hines (born 1933), American singer and comedian
- Mimi Hughes, American long-distance swimmer
- Mimi Jakobsen (born 1948), Danish politician
- Mimi Jennewein (1920–2006), American painter
- Mimi Johnson, American arts administrator
- Mimi Jung (born 1993), South Korean singer and member of girl group Gugudan
- Mimi Jung (born 1981), South Korean artist
- Mimi Kagan (1918–1999), Russia-born American modern dancer, choreographer
- Mimi Karlsen (born 1957), Greenlandic politician
- Mimi Keene (born 1998), English actress
- Mimi Kennedy (born 1949), American actress
- Mimi Khalvati (born 1944), British poet
- Mimi Kodheli (born 1964), Albanian politician
- Mimi Kopperud Slevigen (born 1977), Norwegian handball player
- Mimi Kuzyk (born 1952), Canadian actress
- Mimi LaFollette Summerskill (1917–2008), American educator, author, political activist and vintner
- Mimi Lamote (born 1964), Belgian businesswoman
- Mimí Lazo (born 1954), Venezuelan actress and producer
- Mimi Leahey, American television script writer
- Mimi Leder (born 1952), American film director
- Mimi Lerner (1945–2007), Polish-American mezzo-soprano and voice teacher
- Mimi Lien (born 1976), American set designer
- Mimi Lozano (born 1933), American activist for Hispanic rights
- Mimi Macpherson (born 1967), Australian businesswoman and environmentalist, sister of Elle Macpherson
- Mimi Marks (born 1967), American transsexual entertainer
- Mimi Maynard, American television and voice actress
- Mimi Michaels (born 1983), American actress
- Mimi Miyagi (born 1973), American adult film actress
- Mimi Ndiweni (born 1991), British-Zimbabwean actress
- Mimi Nelson (1922–1999), Swedish film actress
- Mimi Page (born 1987), American singer-songwriter, composer
- Mimi Parent (1924–2005), Canadian artist
- Mimi Parker, drummer and singer for the band Low
- Mimi Perrin (1926–2010), French jazz musician
- Mimi Pollak (1903–1999), Swedish actress and theatre director
- Mimi Pond, American writer and cartoonist
- Mimi Reisel Gladstein (born 1936), American professor of English
- Mimi Rogers (born 1956), American actress
- Mimi Saric (born 1983), Australian football (soccer) player
- Mimi von Schleinitz (1842–1912), Berlin salonnière
- Mimi Schmir, American television producer and screenwriter
- Mimi Sheller (born 1967), American sociologist
- Mimi Sheraton (1926–2023), American food critic
- Mimi Slinger (born 2003), English actress
- Mimi Smith (1903–1992), John Lennon's maternal aunt and guardian
- Mimi Sodré (1892–1982), Brazilian football (soccer) player
- Mimi Stillman (born 1982), American classical flutist
- Mimi Tran (born 1960), Vietnamese-American professional poker player
- Mimi Umidon, American actress, presenter of the Magic Bullet blender
- Mimi Walters (born 1962), former Republican congresswoman from California
- Mimi Webb (born 2000), English singer-songwriter
- Mimi Weddell (1915–2009), American actress
- Mimi Woods, American voice actress

== Nicknames, stage names, and code names ==
- Mimi, the code name for Yvonne Fontaine (1913–1996), a member of the French Resistance working with the Special Operations Executive
- Mimi, nickname of American R&B musician Mariah Carey, source of the title of her 2005 album The Emancipation of Mimi
- Mimi, stage name of South Korean singer Kim Mi-hyun (born 1995) of girl group Oh My Girl
- Mimí, stage name of Mexican singer Irma Angélica Hernández Ochoa (born 1962) of the pop music group Flans
- Mimi, nickname of Iraqi footballer Mohanad Ali (born 2000)
- Mimi Wong, stage name of bar hostess Wong Weng Siu (1939–1973), who was executed for murder in Singapore
- Mimi Xu (born 2007), Welsh tennis player
- Priyanka Chopra (born 1982), Indian actress, sometimes informally referred to as "Mimi"

== Mythological and fictional characters ==
- Mimi (folklore), a fairy-like being in the mythology of Northern Aboriginal Australians
- Mimì (La bohème), the leading female role in Puccini's opera La bohème
- Inspector Domenico "Mimì" Augello, a character in the Montalbano TV show
- Mimi Bobeck, a character from The Drew Carey Show played by Kathy Kinney
- Mimi Clark, a character in the television series Jericho
- Mimi Glossop, character played by Ginger Rogers in the 1934 film The Gay Divorcee
- Mimi Labonq, a character in the BBC sitcom 'Allo 'Allo!
- Mimi Lockhart, a character in Days of our Lives
- Mimi Marquez, a character in Rent, a musical based on La bohème
- Mimi Mortin, the main character of the Canadian animated television series What about Mimi?
- Mimi Tachikawa, a character from the Japanese anime Digimon
- Mimi Tasogare, a character from the Japanese anime Duel Masters

== See also ==
- Mimi (disambiguation)
