= Lingyan Temple =

Lingyan Temple (traditional Chinese: 靈巖寺, simplified Chinese: 灵岩寺, pinyin: Líng Yán Sì) may refer to:

- Lingyan Temple (Jinan), in Jinan, Shandong, China
- Yanshan Temple, in Fanshi County, Shanxi, China, formerly known as Lingyan Temple

== See also ==
- Ling Yen Mountain Temple
- Lingyan Pavilion, in Chang'an, Shaanxi, China
- Lingyin Temple, near Hangzhou, Zhejiang, China
