= Olaniyi =

Yoruba name

Oláníyì
- Gender: Unisex
- Language: Yoruba

Origin
- Origin: Nigerian
- Meaning: Wealth is honourable
- Region of origin: South-West Nigeria

Ọláníyì audio is a unisex Nigerian name of Yoruba origin, it means "Wealth is honourable". It's derived from two words which are "Ọlá" (meaning wealth) and "Níyì" (to have honour or value), both words also serve as the demunitive form of Ọláníyì.

== Popular people bearing the name ==
- Olaniyi Afonja (Nigerian comedian and actor)
- Elijah Olaniyi (American basketball player born to Nigerian parents)
- Olaniyi R. Akindiya (Nigerian visual artist)
- David Oyedepo Olaniyi (Nigerian Clergyman)
