= Gufo =

Gufo may refer to:

- Queen Mother of the West - a goddess in Chinese religion and mythology
- Gufo Temple - Chinese temple located in Shanxi province
- Gufo radar - World War II Italian naval search radar
- Gufo (horse) - American thoroughbred racehorse
