= Mimi =

Mimi or MIMI may refer to:

== People and fictional characters ==
- Mimi (given name), a list of people and fictional characters
- Constantin Mimi (1868–1935), Bessarabian politician and winemaker
- Mimi (footballer, born 1996), Bissau Guinean footballer
- Mohanad Ali (born 2000), Iraqi footballer commonly known as Mimi
- Mariah Carey (born 1969), with the personal nickname "Mimi" used in some of her albums
- Mimí (born 1962), Mexican singer
- Mimiyuuuh (born 1996), Filipino model and YouTuber
- Priyanka Chopra (born 1982), Indian actress, sometimes informally referred to as "Mimi"
- Mimi (singer) (born 1995), South Korean rapper and singer, member of girl group Oh My Girl

== Places ==
- Mimi, Nepal, a village and municipality
- Mimi, New Zealand, a locality in Taranaki, New Zealand
- Mimi River (disambiguation)
- Mimi Islet, part of the Bourke Isles between Australia and New Guinea
- Mimi Temple, a temple in China
- 1127 Mimi, an asteroid

== Arts and entertainment ==
- "Mimi" (song), a popular song by Rodgers and Hart
- Mimi (1935 film), a 1935 British film
- Mimi (1979 film), a 1979 Italian film
- Mimi (2021 Hindi film), a 2021 Indian Hindi-language comedy-drama film
  - Mimi (soundtrack), its soundtrack by A. R. Rahman
- Mimi (2021 Nigerian film), a 2021 Nigerian film
- Mimi (TV series), a 2014 South Korean television drama series
- MIMI (literary award), Germany
- Mimi (magazine), a Japanese manga magazine published by Kodansha
- "Mimi", a song by Big Red Machine featuring Ilsey from the 2021 album How Long Do You Think It's Gonna Last?
- Mi-Mi, the light blue and one of the eight Tiddlytubbies

== Other uses ==
- Mimi Chocolate, a Bangladeshi brand
- Mimi (folklore), fairy-like being in the mythology of Northern Aboriginal Australians
- Mimi language, several related languages spoken in Chad
- Mimi Temple, a temple in China
- HMS Mimi and HMS Toutou, two British boats brought to Lake Tanganyika to fight the Germans in 1915
- Mimi (horse), winner of the 1891 1000 Guineas and Oaks horse race
- Magnetospheric Imaging Instrument, a sensing instrument used to study particles in Saturn's magnetic field

== See also ==
- Mimivirus, the largest known virus affecting amoebae
- Mimi's Cafe, a restaurant chain in the United States
- Mimi and Mi a Japanese morpheme associated with rulers
