= Mimi River =

Mimi River may refer to:

- Mimi River (Japan)
- Mimi River (New Zealand)

== See also ==
- Mimi (disambiguation)
