= Mount Wutai =

Sacred Buddhist site in Shanxi, China

- 五台山
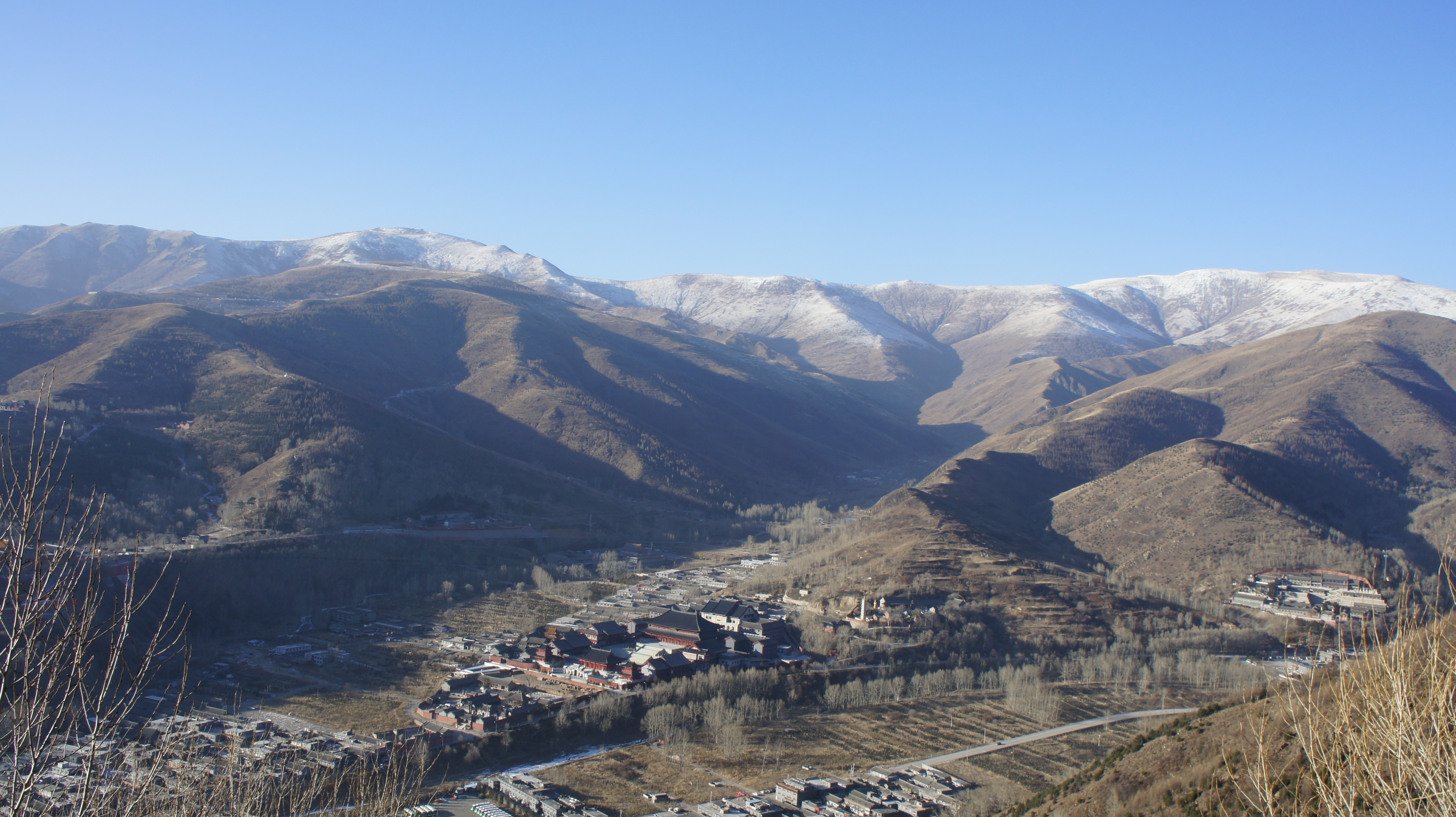
- Mount Wutai from the air

Highest point
- Elevation: 3,061 m (10,043 ft)
- Prominence: 1,784 m (5,853 ft)
- Listing: Ultra
- Coordinates: 39°04′45″N 113°33′53″E

Geography
- Location within Shanxi
- Location: Wutai County, Shanxi, China

Climbing
- Easiest route: Hike

UNESCO World Heritage Site
- Criteria: Cultural: ii, iii, iv, vi
- Reference: 1279
- Inscription: 2009 (33rd Session)
- Area: 18,415 ha (45,500 acres)
- Buffer zone: 42,312 ha (104,560 acres)

Mount Wutai
- Chinese: 五台山
- Literal meaning: "Five-Terrace Mountain"
Transcriptions
Standard Mandarin
- Hanyu Pinyin: Wǔtái shān
- Wade–Giles: Wu^{3}-t'ai^{2} shan^{1}
- IPA: [ù.tʰâɪ ʂán]
Wu
- Romanization: Ng^{上}-de^{入}-se^{平}
Yue: Cantonese
- Yale Romanization: Ngh-tòih sāan
- Jyutping: Ng5-toi4 saan1
- IPA: [ŋ.tʰɔj˩ san˥]
Southern Min
- Hokkien POJ: Ńgo͘-tâi-soaⁿ
- Tâi-lô: Ngóo-tâi suann

Mount Wutai, also known by its Chinese name Wutaishan and as Mount Qingliang, is a sacred Buddhist site at the headwaters of the Qingshui in Shanxi Province, China. Its central area is surrounded by a cluster of flat-topped peaks or mesas roughly corresponding to the cardinal directions. The north peak (Beitai Ding or Yedou Feng) is the highest (3,061 m or 10,043 ft from sea) and is also the highest point in North China.

As host to over 53 sacred monasteries, Mount Wutai is home to many of China's most important monasteries and temples. It was inscribed as a UNESCO World Heritage Site in 2009 and named a AAAAA tourist attraction by China's National Tourism Administration in 2007.

== Significance ==
Mount Wutai is one of the Four Sacred Mountains in Chinese Buddhism. Each of the mountains is viewed as the bodhimaṇḍa (道場; dàocháng) of one of the four great bodhisattvas. Wǔtái is the home of the Bodhisattva of wisdom, Mañjuśrī or "文殊" (Wénshū) in Chinese. Mañjuśrī has been associated with Mount Wutai since ancient times. Paul Williams writes:

Apparently the association of Mañjuśrī with Wutai (Wu-t'ai) Shan in north China was known in classical times in India itself, identified by Chinese scholars with the mountain in the 'north-east' (when seen from India or Central Asia) referred to as the abode of Mañjuśrī in the Avataṃsaka Sūtra. There are said to have been pilgrimages from India and other Asian countries to Wutai Shan by the seventh century.

Wutai was the first of the mountains to be identified and is often referred to as "first among the four great mountains". It was identified on the basis of a passage in the Avataṃsaka Sūtra, which describes the abodes of many bodhisattvas. In this chapter, Mañjuśrī is said to reside on a "clear cold mountain" in the northeast. This served as charter for the mountain's identity and its alternate name "Clear Cool Mountain" (清涼山; Qīngliáng Shān).

The bodhisattva is believed to frequently appear on the mountain, taking the form of ordinary pilgrims, monks, or most often unusual five-colored clouds.

Reflecting regional rivalries between Buddhist centers, 9th-century Chan Buddhism master Linji Yixuan criticized the prominence of Wutai in Tang dynasty China. According to the posthumously compiled Línjì yǔlù, Linji Yixuan once said, "There‘s a bunch of students who seek Mañjuśrī on Mount Wutai. Wrong from the start! There‘s no Mañjuśrī on Mount Wutai." His campaign was however not successful, and even after the Tang era Mount Wutai "continued to thrive as perhaps the single most famous Buddhist sacred site in China."

Mount Wutai has an enduring relationship with Tibetan Buddhism. It was historically sacred to Taoist pilgrims on the Silk Road in the 10th century as well.

Mount Wutai is home to some of the oldest wooden buildings in China that have survived since the era of the Tang dynasty (618–907). This includes the main hall of Nanchan Temple and the East Hall of Foguang Temple, built in 782 and 857, respectively. They were discovered in 1937 and 1938 by a team of architectural historians including the prominent early 20th-century historian Liang Sicheng. The architectural designs of these buildings have since been studied by leading sinologists and experts in traditional Chinese architecture, such as Nancy Steinhardt. Steinhardt classified these buildings according to the hall types featured in the Yingzao Fashi Chinese building manual written in the 12th century.

In 2008, there were complaints from local residents that, in preparation for Mount Wutai's bid to become a UNESCO World Heritage Site, they were forced from their homes and relocated away from their livelihoods.

== Major temples ==
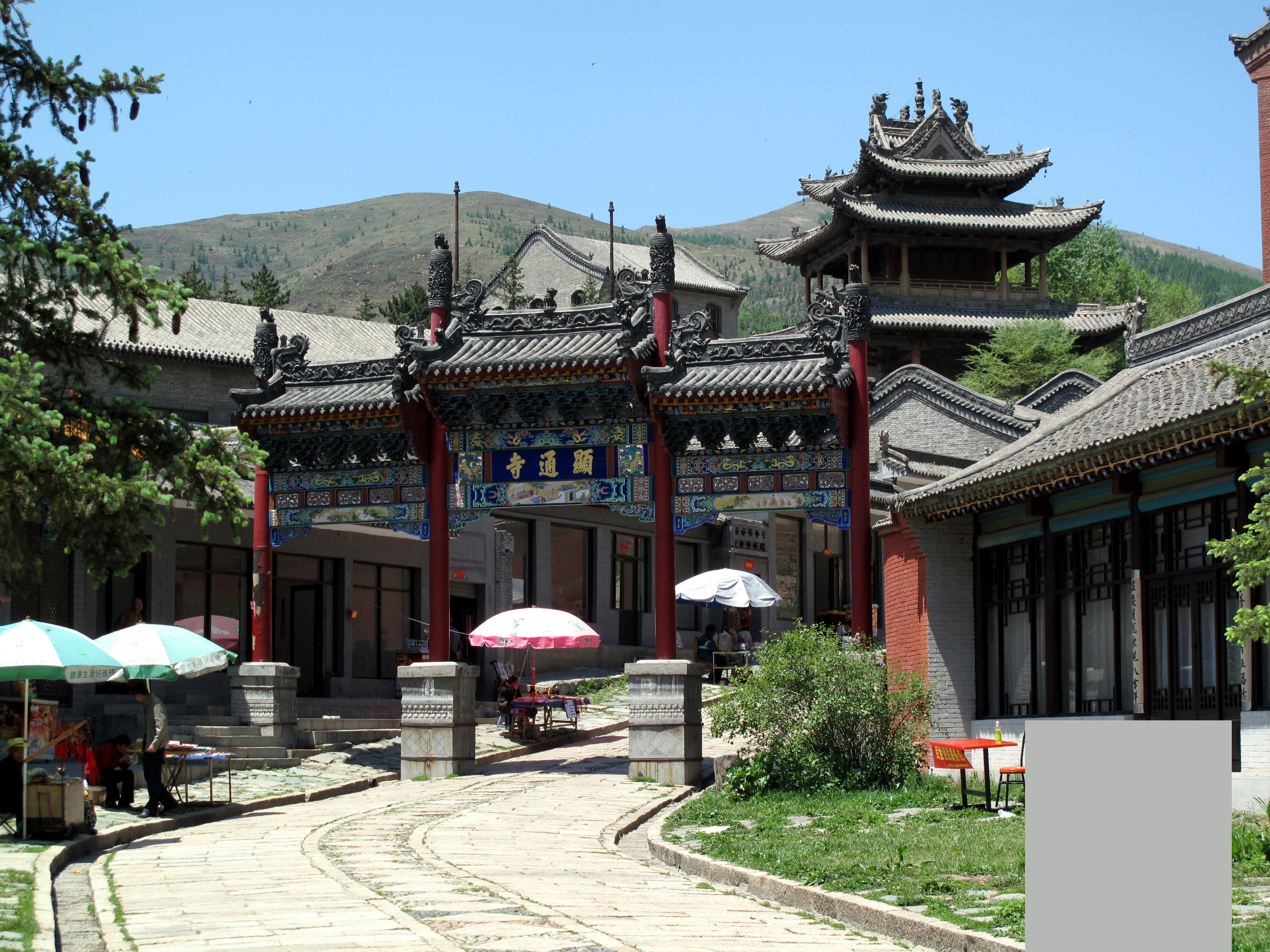
The road from Taihuai Village leads up toward the major mountain temples of Mount Wutai.

Nanchan Temple (Chinese: 南禅寺) 38.9815°N 113.5738°E is a large Chan temple in Mount Wutai, first built in the Tang dynasty. The whole temple comprises seven terraces, divided into three parts. The lower three terraces are named Jile Temple (極樂寺); the middle terrace is called Shande Hall (善德堂); the upper three terraces are named Youguo Temple (佑國寺). Other major temples include Xiantong Temple, Tayuan Temple and Pusading Temple.

Other important temples inside Mount Wutai include Shouning Temple, Bishan Temple, Puhua Temple, Dailuo Ding, Qixian Temple, Shifang Tang, Shuxiang Temple, Guangzong Temple, Youguo Temple, Guanyin Dong, Longhua Temple, Luomuhou Temple, Jinge Temple, Zhanshan Temple, Wanfo Ge, Guanhai Temple, Zhulin Temple, Jifu Temple, Jihe Temple, and Gufo Temple.

Outer Mount Wutai temples include Yanqing Temple, Nanchan Temple, Mimi Temple, Foguang Temple, Yanshan Temple, Zunsheng Temple, and Guangji Temple. A giant statue of Maha Manjushree was presented to the Buddhists of China by foreign minister of Nepal Ramesh Nath Pandey in 2005.

== Transportation ==
The Wutaishan Airport in nearby Dingxiang County opened in December 2015.

== Honors ==
In April 2020, it was selected into the "2020 World Famous Summer Mountains List".

In April 2020, it was selected into the "2020 China's Famous Summer Mountains List".

In September 2022, the planation surface of Mount Wutai was selected into the list of the most beautiful geological relics in Shanxi Province.

== Climate ==
Mount Wutai has a subarctic climate (Köppen climate classification Dwc). The average annual temperature in Haidian is 2.2 °C (36.0 °F). The average annual rainfall is 686.7 mm (27.04 in) with July as the wettest month. The temperatures are highest on average in July, at around 15.0 °C (59.0 °F), and lowest in January, at around −11.8 °C (10.8 °F). The temperature in Mount Wutai is comfortable from July to August, which is suitable for travel. It's very cold from November to March. The extreme low temperature in Mount Wutai occurred on 15 January 1958, which was -44.8°C.

Climate data for Mount Wutai, elevation 2,208 m (7,244 ft), (1991–2020 normals, extremes 1951–present)
Month	Jan	Feb	Mar	Apr	May	Jun	Jul	Aug	Sep	Oct	Nov	Dec	Year
Record high °C (°F)	8.8 (47.8)	10.1 (50.2)	16.1 (61.0)	23.8 (74.8)	25.6 (78.1)	29.6 (85.3)	28.6 (83.5)	25.1 (77.2)	24.2 (75.6)	18.7 (65.7)	13.5 (56.3)	7.8 (46.0)	29.6 (85.3)
Mean daily maximum °C (°F)	−7.5 (18.5)	−4.7 (23.5)	1.2 (34.2)	8.6 (47.5)	14.2 (57.6)	17.6 (63.7)	19.1 (66.4)	17.7 (63.9)	13.5 (56.3)	7.7 (45.9)	−0.1 (31.8)	−6.6 (20.1)	6.7 (44.1)
Daily mean °C (°F)	−11.8 (10.8)	−9.2 (15.4)	−3.8 (25.2)	3.2 (37.8)	9.0 (48.2)	12.8 (55.0)	15.0 (59.0)	13.6 (56.5)	9.3 (48.7)	3.2 (37.8)	−4.3 (24.3)	−10.8 (12.6)	2.2 (35.9)
Mean daily minimum °C (°F)	−15.4 (4.3)	−12.8 (9.0)	−7.8 (18.0)	−1.0 (30.2)	4.8 (40.6)	9.0 (48.2)	11.8 (53.2)	10.6 (51.1)	6.2 (43.2)	−0.2 (31.6)	−7.7 (18.1)	−14.2 (6.4)	−1.4 (29.5)
Record low °C (°F)	−44.8 (−48.6)	−39.2 (−38.6)	−34.7 (−30.5)	−26.2 (−15.2)	−15.9 (3.4)	−7.8 (18.0)	−3.5 (25.7)	−2.9 (26.8)	−15.7 (3.7)	−24.2 (−11.6)	−36.0 (−32.8)	−37.6 (−35.7)	−44.8 (−48.6)
Average precipitation mm (inches)	6.6 (0.26)	11.2 (0.44)	19.3 (0.76)	31.0 (1.22)	53.6 (2.11)	97.5 (3.84)	168.8 (6.65)	153.2 (6.03)	85.6 (3.37)	38.2 (1.50)	16.1 (0.63)	5.6 (0.22)	686.7 (27.03)
Average precipitation days (≥ 0.1 mm)	4.1	5.5	6.6	7.1	8.6	13.5	15.7	14.2	10.9	6.9	5.3	4.3	102.7
Average snowy days	5.6	6.9	7.9	6.0	1.8	0.2	0.1	0	0.3	3.3	6.3	5.4	43.8
Average relative humidity (%)	50	53	48	49	51	66	78	80	72	61	55	52	60
Mean monthly sunshine hours	220.1	203.5	248.1	246.3	276.7	225.7	216.5	189.0	200.3	220.9	211.0	211.7	2,669.8
Percentage possible sunshine	72	67	66	62	62	51	48	45	54	65	71	73	61
Source: China Meteorological Administration all-time extreme temperature NOAA

== Gallery ==
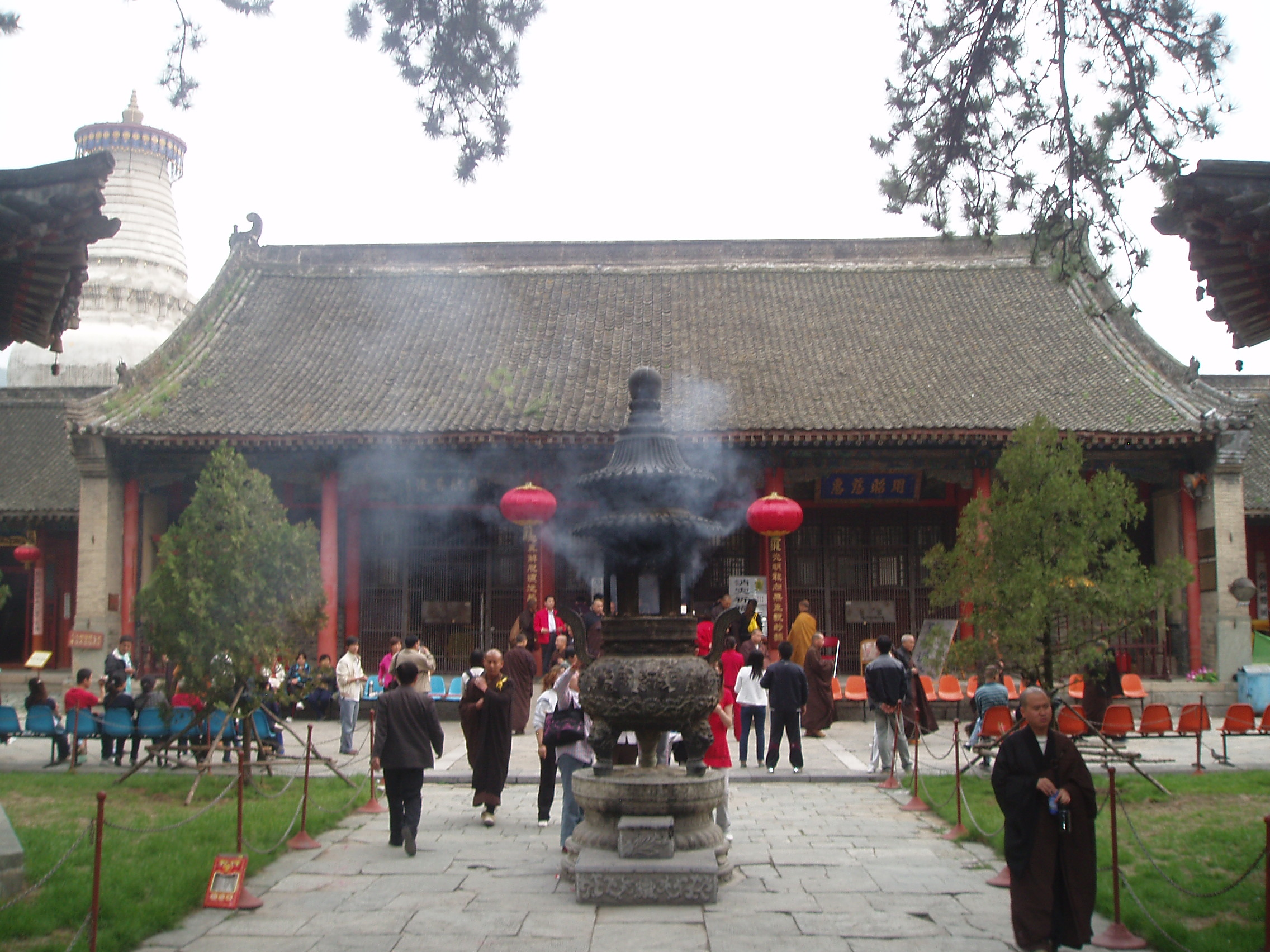
The Xiantong Temple, a major temple at Mount Wutai

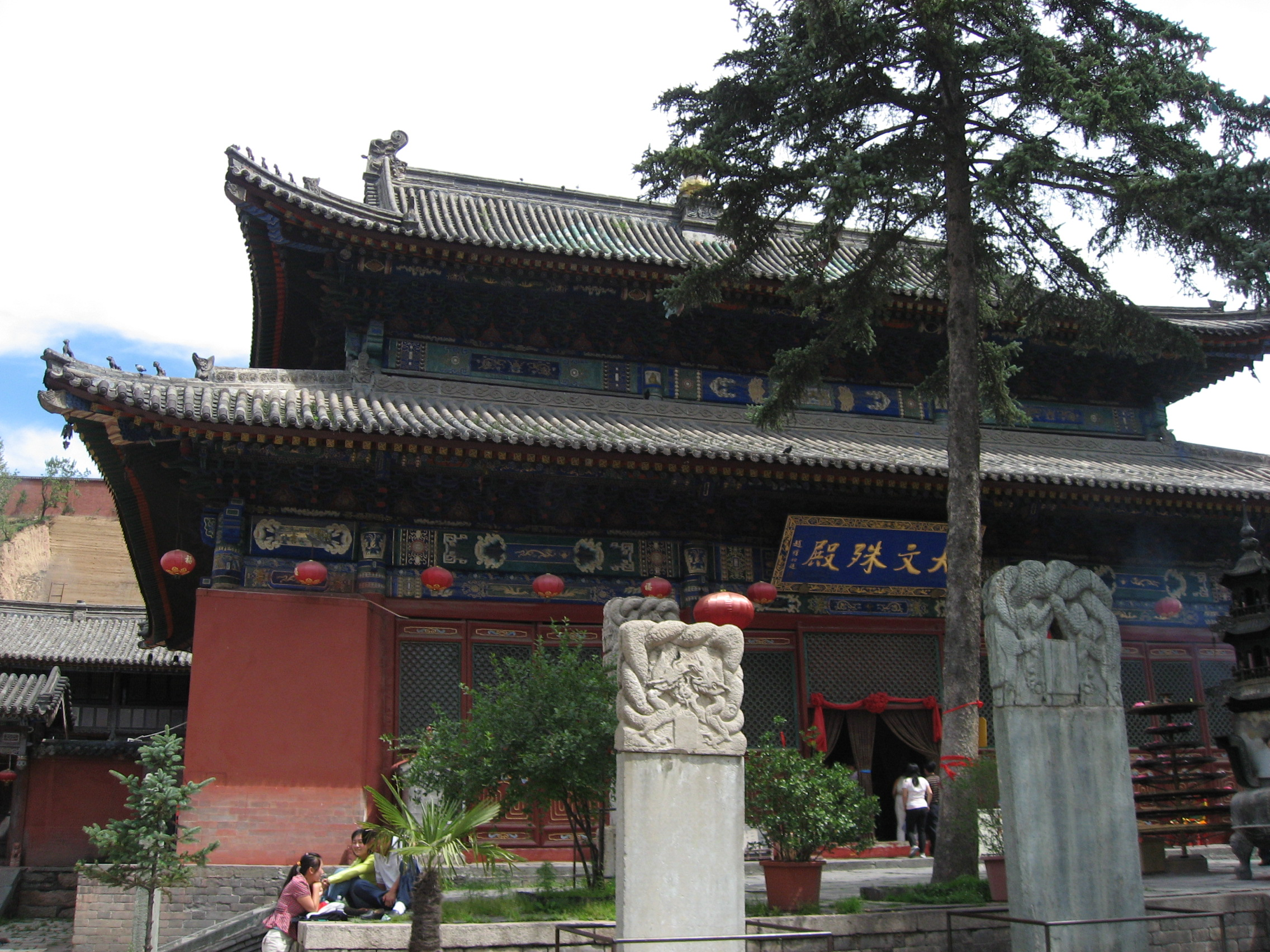
A palace hall at Mount Wutai

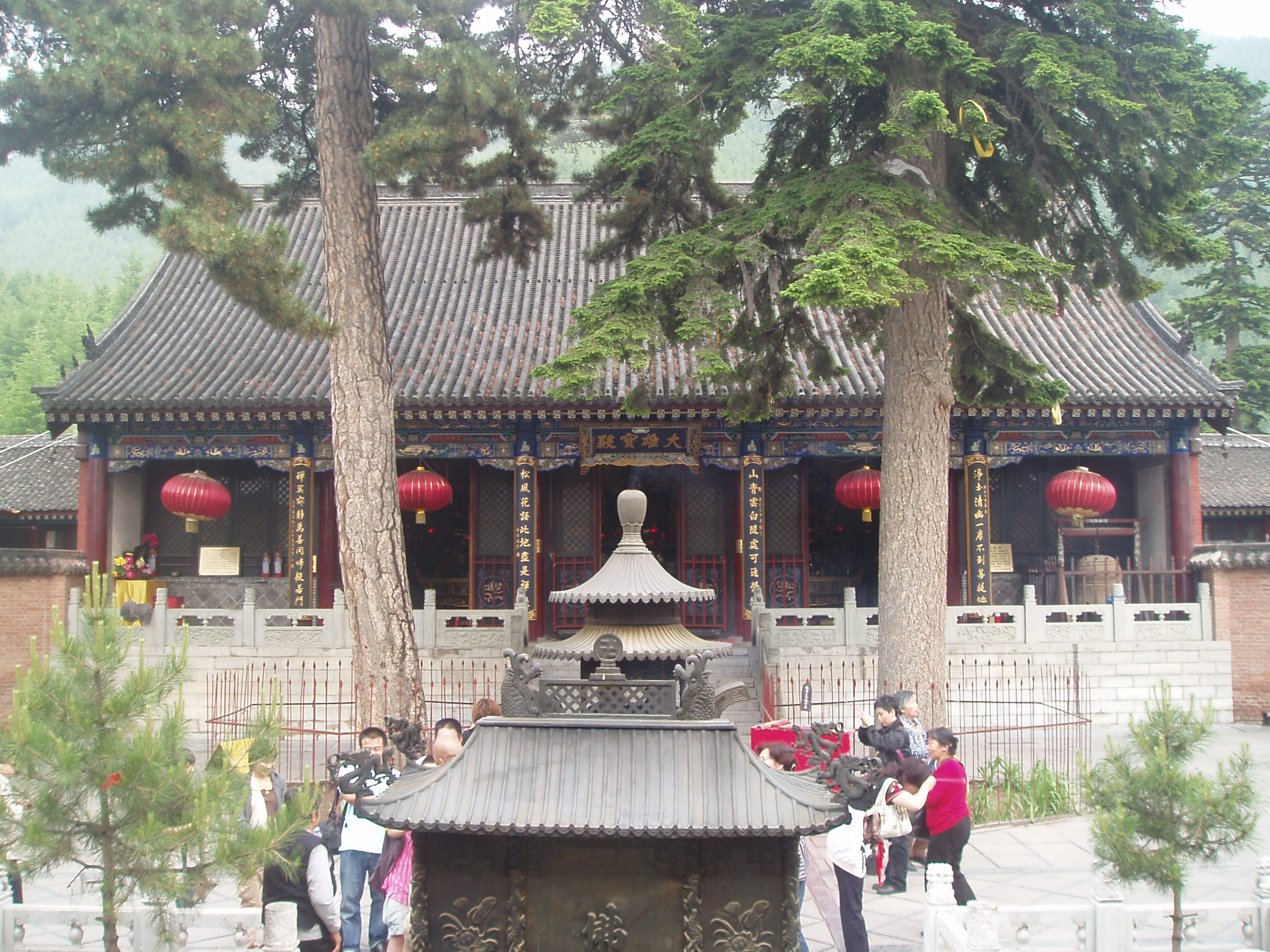
The Dailuoding Temple

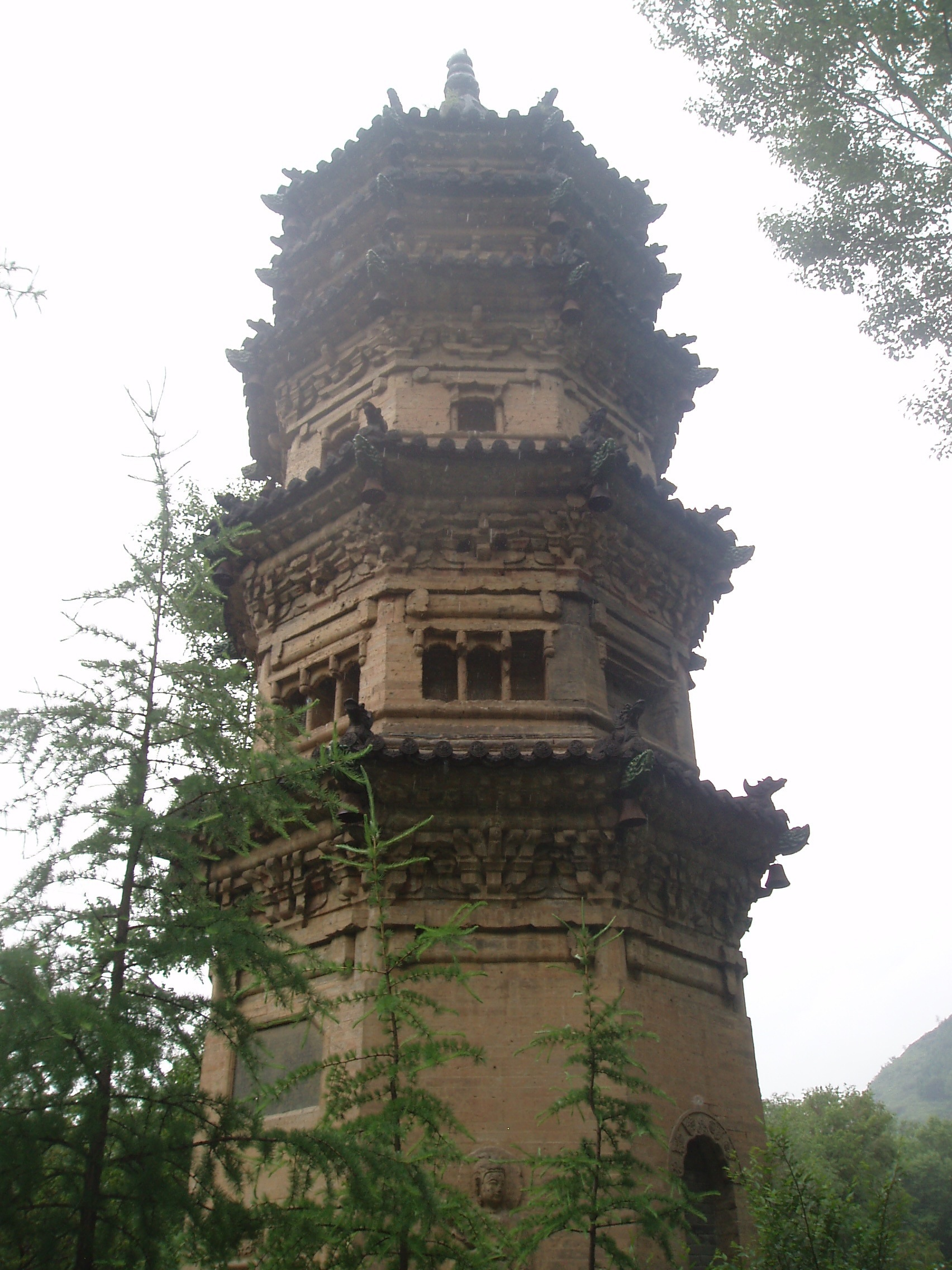
The Lingfeng Temple pagoda

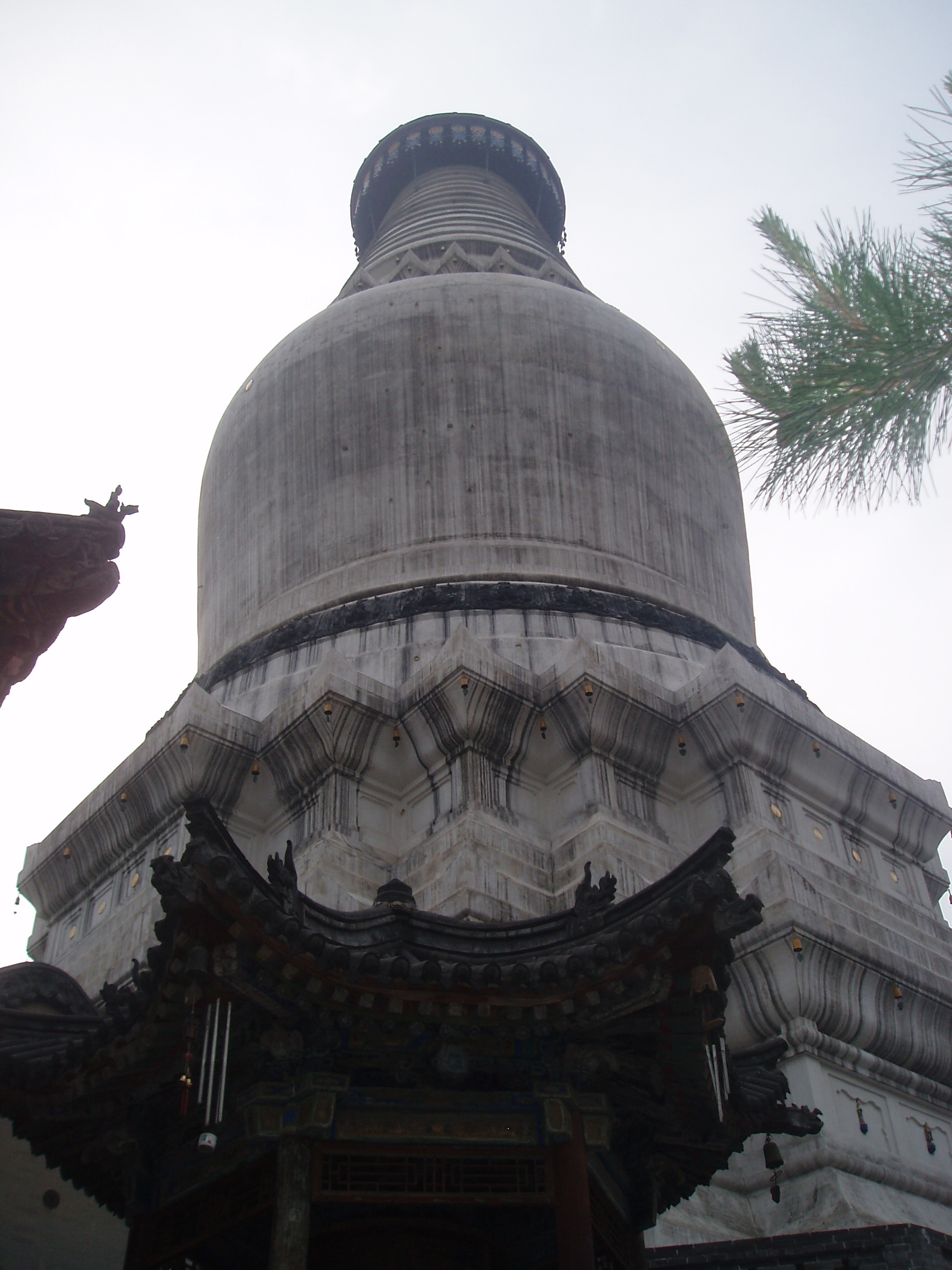
The Sarira Stupa of Tayuan Temple, built in 1582 during the Ming dynasty

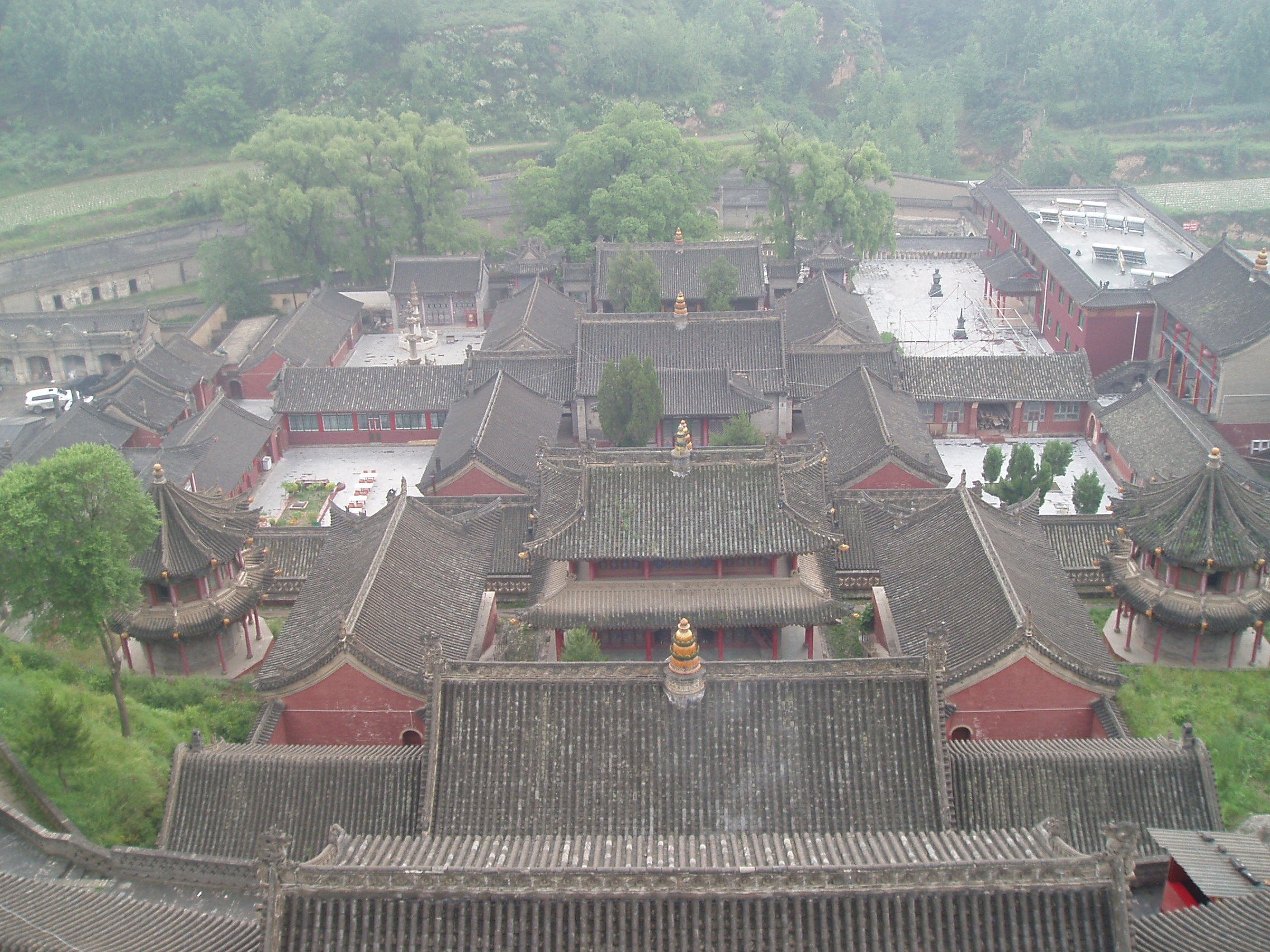
View of the Zunsheng Temple

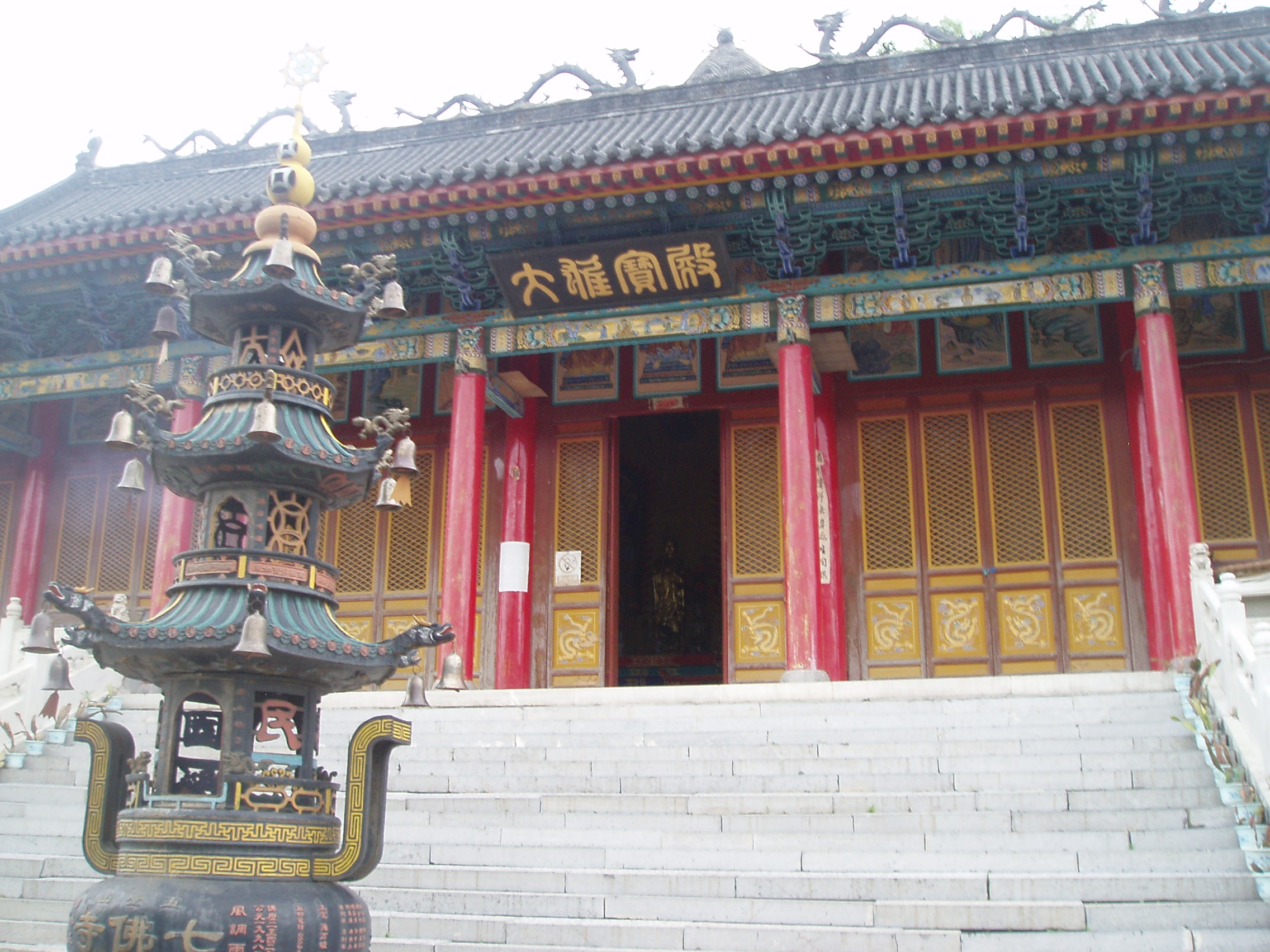
Qifo Temple

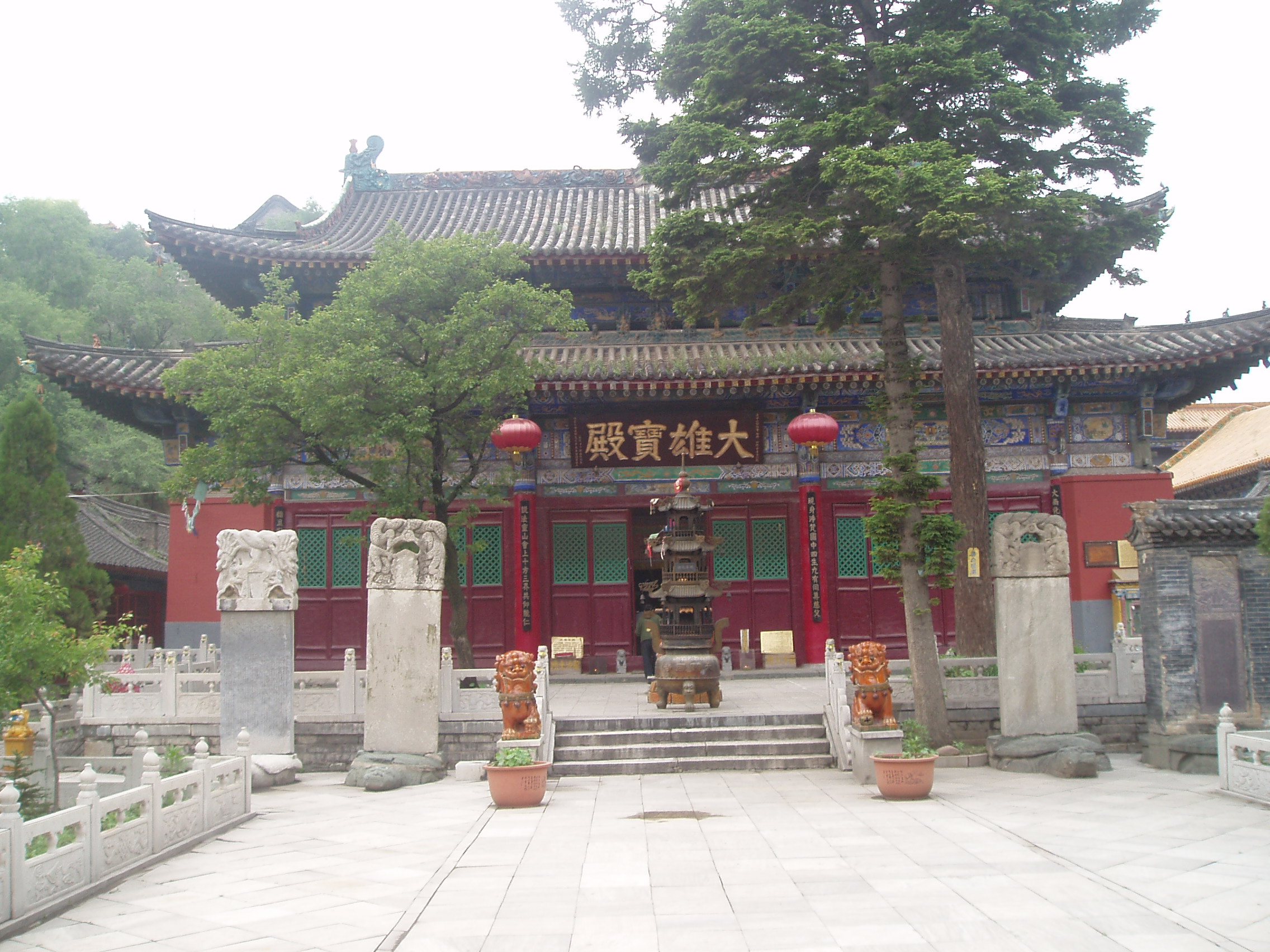
Yuanzhao Temple

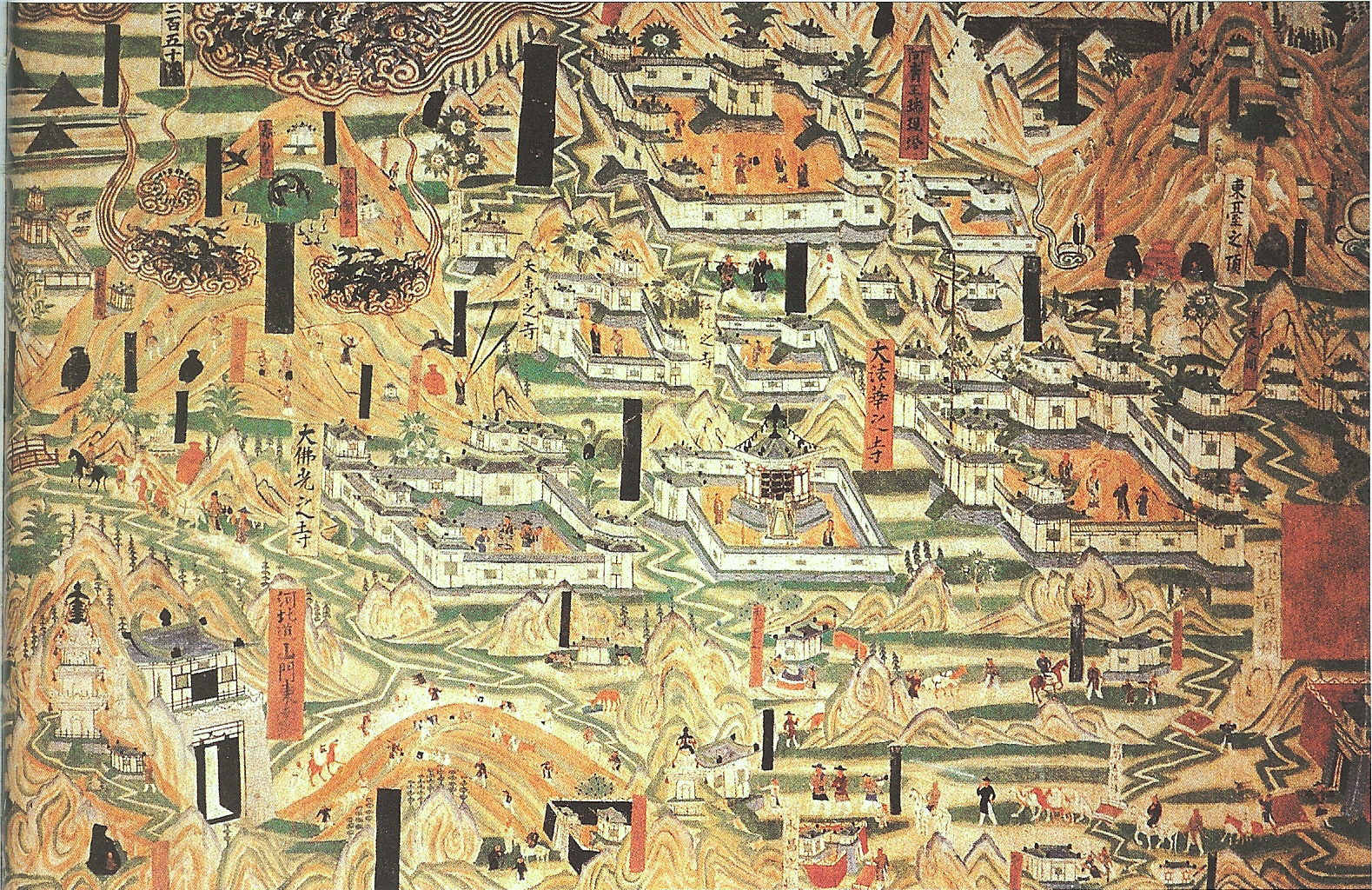
10th century mural of Mount Wutai. From Cave 61 of Mogao Caves in Dunhuang

1846, Qing dynasty map of Mount Wutai

== See also ==
- Chinese Buddhism
- Buddhism in China
- List of Major National Historical and Cultural Sites in Shanxi
- List of AAAAA-rated tourist attractions of the People's Republic of China
