= Qixian Temple (Mount Wutai) =

Buddhist temple in Taihuai, China

- 栖贤寺

- Location within Shanxi Location within China

Religion
- Affiliation: Buddhism
- Sect: Tibetan Buddhism
- Leadership: Yixi (益西)

Location
- Location: Mount Wutai, Wutai County, Shanxi
- Country: China
- Interactive map of Qixian Temple
- Coordinates: 38°59′39″N 113°35′56″E

Architecture
- Style: Chinese architecture
- Established: Kangxi era (1662–1722)

Qixian Temple (simplified Chinese: 栖贤寺; traditional Chinese: 棲賢寺; pinyin: Qīxián Sì), also known as Guanyin Cave (观音洞; 觀音洞; Guānyīn Dòng), is a Buddhist temple located on Mount Wutai of Taihuai Town, in Wutai County, Shanxi, China.

== History ==
The temple was originally built in the Kangxi era (1662–1722) of the Qing dynasty (1644–1911).

Legend said that the 6th Dalai Lama once settled at the temple.

The temple has been added to the list of National Key Buddhist Temples in Han Chinese Area by the State Council of China.

== Architecture ==
The existing main buildings include the Shanmen, Mahavira Hall, Hall of Guanyin and Meditation Hall.
