= Nanchan Temple =

Buddhist temple in Shanxi, China

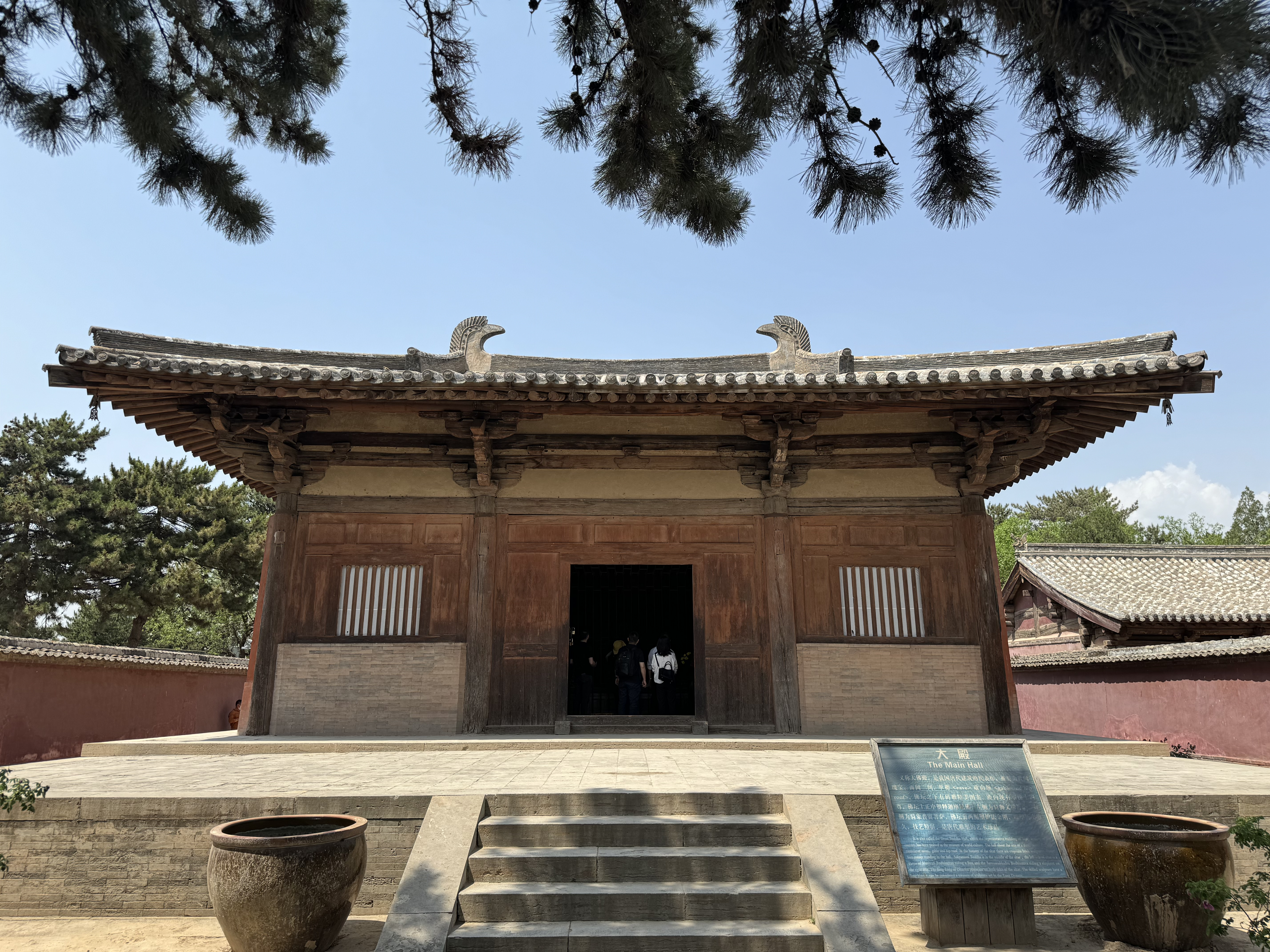
- The Great Buddha Hall of Nanchan Temple

- Location within Shanxi Location within China

Religion
- Affiliation: Buddhism
- Province: Shanxi

Location
- Location: Mount Wutai
- Coordinates: 38°42′04″N 113°06′50″E

Architecture
- Completed: 782; 1244 years ago Tang dynasty

Nanchan Temple (Chinese: 南禪寺; pinyin: Nánchán Sì) is a Buddhist temple located near the town of Doucun on Mount Wutai, Shanxi, China. Nanchan Temple was built in 782 during China's Tang dynasty, and its Great Buddha Hall is currently China's oldest preserved timber building extant, as wooden buildings are often prone to fire and various destruction. Not only is Nanchan Temple an important architectural site, but it also contains an original set of artistically important Tang sculptures dating from the period of its construction. Seventeen sculptures share the hall's interior space with a small stone pagoda.

== History ==
According to an inscription on a beam, the Great Buddha Hall of Nanchan Temple was first built in 782 CE during the Tang dynasty. It escaped destruction during the Buddhist purges of 845, perhaps due to its isolated location in the mountains. Another inscription on a beam indicates that the hall was renovated in 1086 of the Song dynasty, and during that time all but four of the original square columns were replaced with round columns. In the 1950s, the building was rediscovered by architectural historians and, in 1961, was recognized as China's oldest standing timber-frame building. Just five years later in 1966, the building was damaged in an earthquake, and during the renovation period in the 1970s, historians got a chance to study the building piece by piece.

== Great Buddha Hall ==
As the oldest extant timber-frame building in China, the Great Buddha Hall is an important building in the understanding of Chinese architectural history. The humble building is a three bay square hall that is 10 metres (33 ft) deep and 11.75 metres (38.5 ft) across the front. The roof is supported by twelve pillars that are implanted directly into a brick foundation. The hip-gable roof is supported by five-puzuo brackets. The hall does not contain any interior columns or a ceiling, nor are there any struts supporting the roof in between the columns. All of these features indicate that this is a low-status structure. The hall contains several features of Tang dynasty halls, including its longer central front bay, the use of camel-hump braces, and the presence of a yuetai.

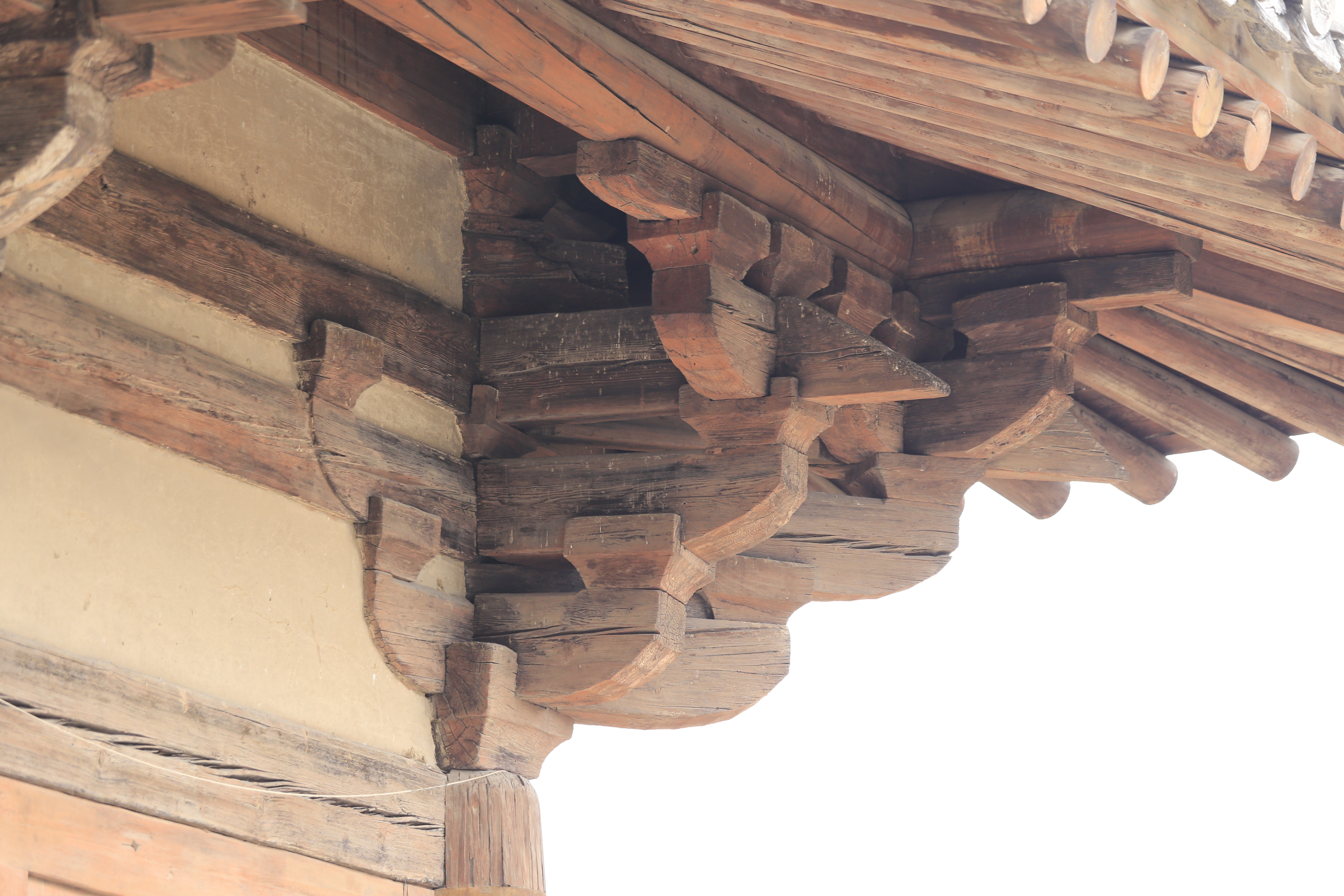
Dougong brackets closeup

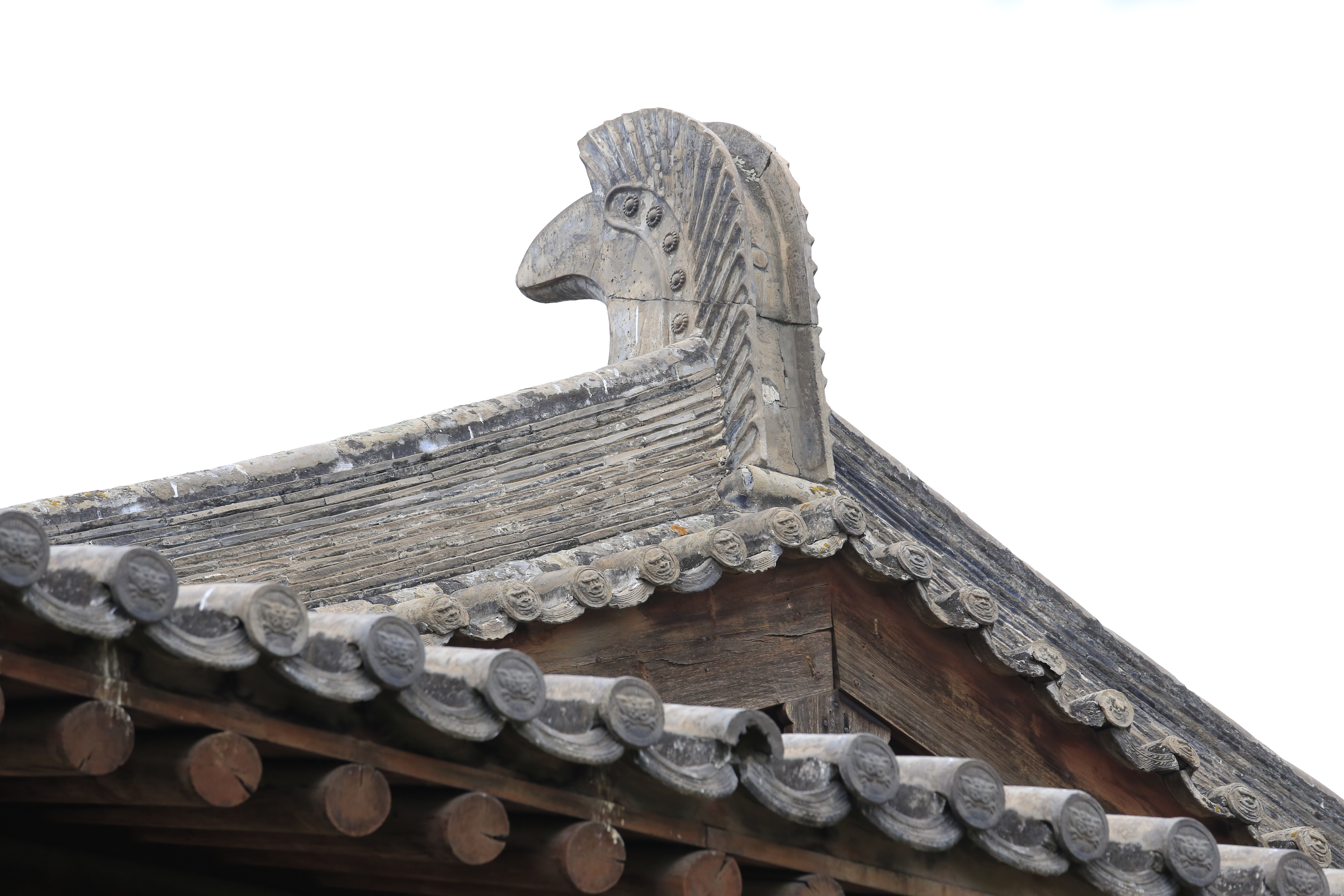
Chiwei-roof ornament

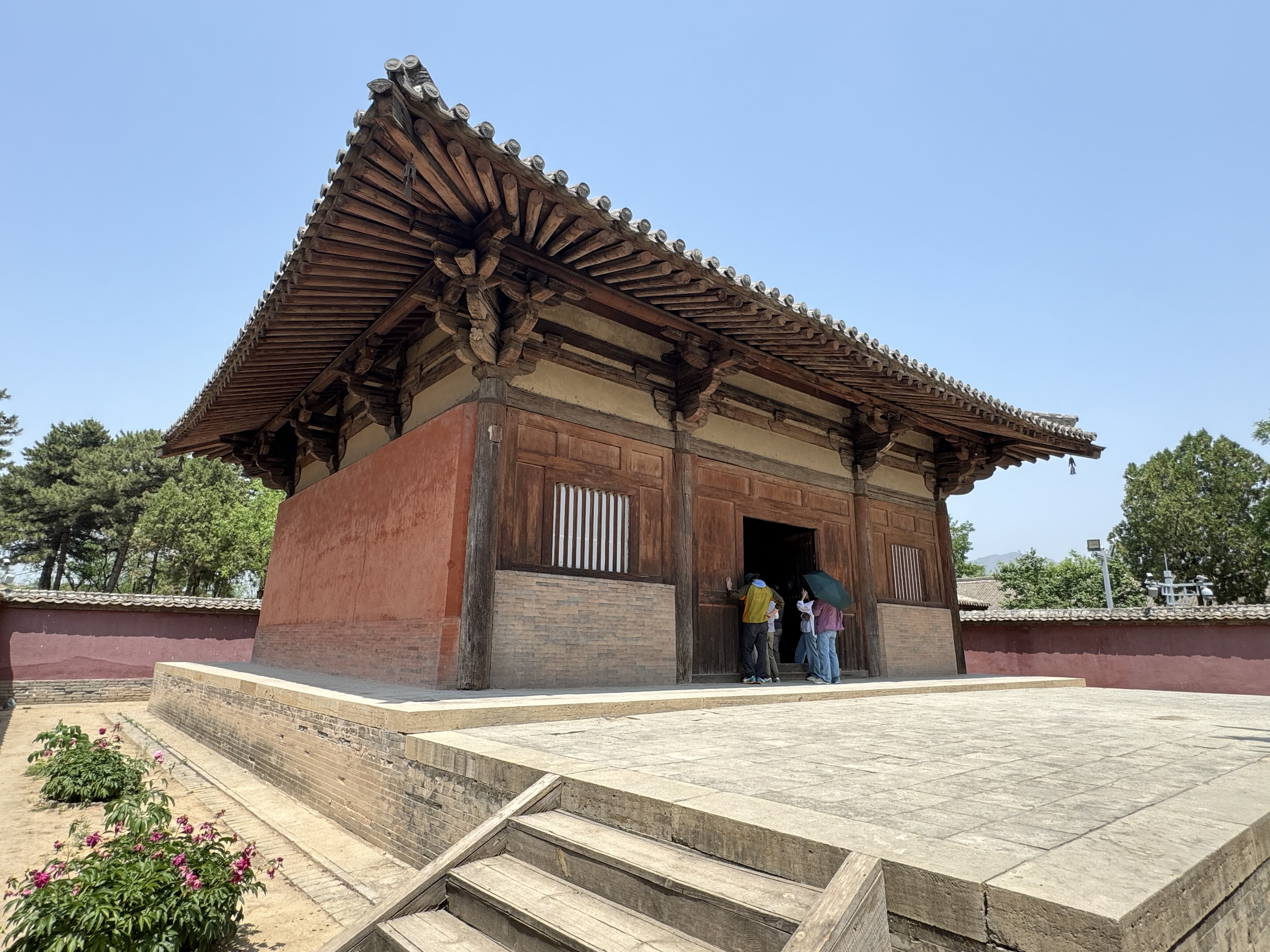
Sideview of the Great Hall

=== Sculptures ===
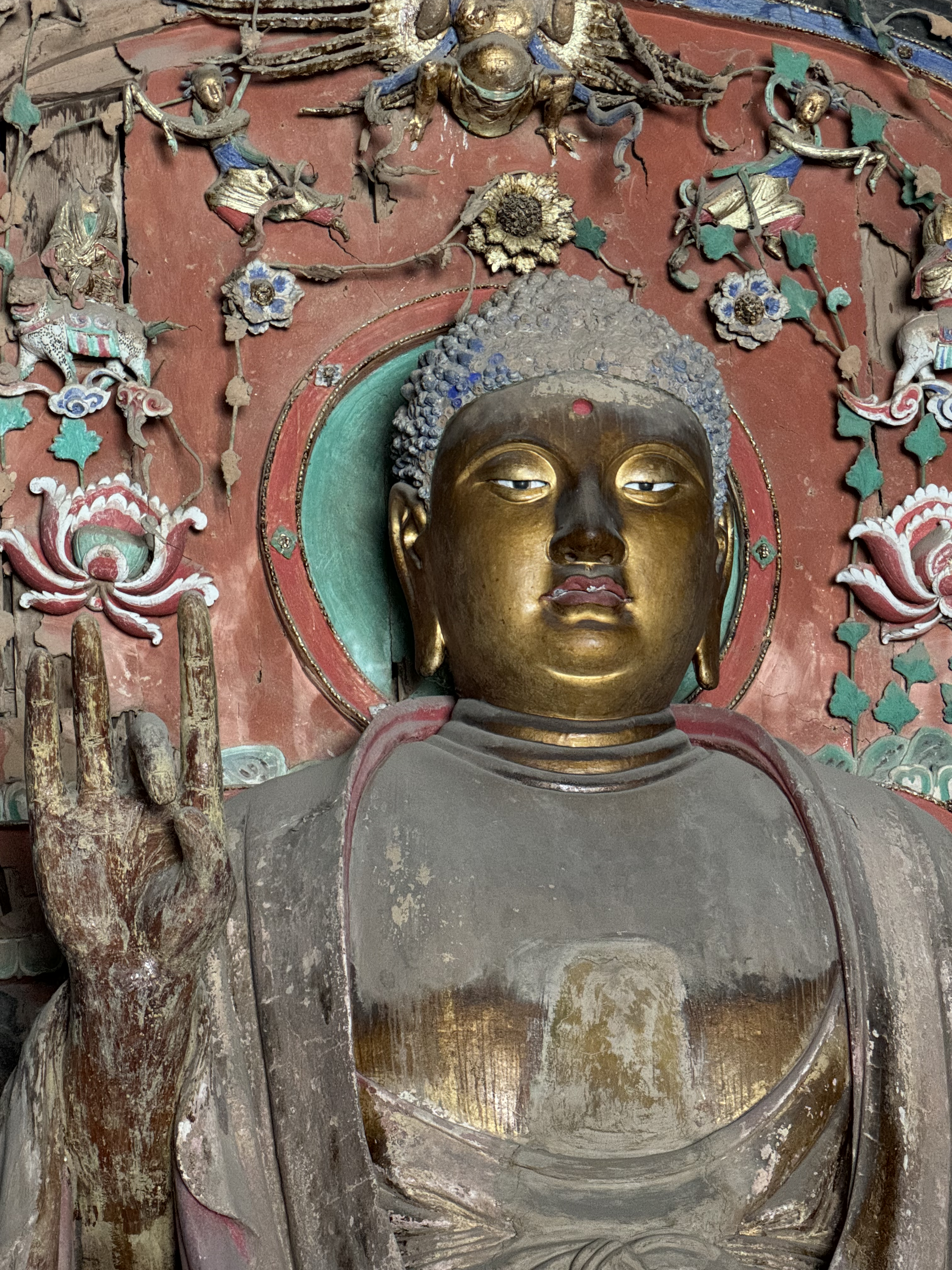
Tang Dynasty statue of Shijamounifo (Śākyamuni)

Along with nearby Foguang Temple, Nanchan Temple contains original sculptures dating from the Tang dynasty. The hall contains seventeen statues and are lined up on an inverted U-shaped dais. The largest statue is of Shijamounifo (Śākyamuni), placed in the center of the hall sitting cross-legged on a sumeru throne adorned with sculpted images of a lion and demigod. Above the large halo behind the statue are sculpted representations of lotus flowers, celestial beings and mythical birds. Flanking him on each side are attendant bodhisattvas with a knee placed on a lotus. A large statue of Puxian (Samantabhadra) riding an elephant is at the far left of the hall and a large statue of Wenshu (Manjushri) riding a lion is on the far left. There are also statues of two of Shijamounifo's disciples, Anan (Ānanda) and Mohejiashe (Mahākāśyapa), two statues of heavenly kings and four statues of attendants. Of the seventeen original Tang statues, three of them were stolen in 1999 and have not been recovered (left and right side attendant bodhisattvas on lotus, an attendant statue leading the lion).

The Great Buddha Hall also contains one small carved Northern Wei stone pagoda that is five levels high. The first level is carved with a story about the Buddha, and each corner contains an additional small pagoda. Each side of the second level is carved with one large Buddha in the center, flanked with four smaller Buddhas on each side. The upper three levels have three carved Buddhas on each side. The stone pagoda was stolen in 2011 and has not been recovered.

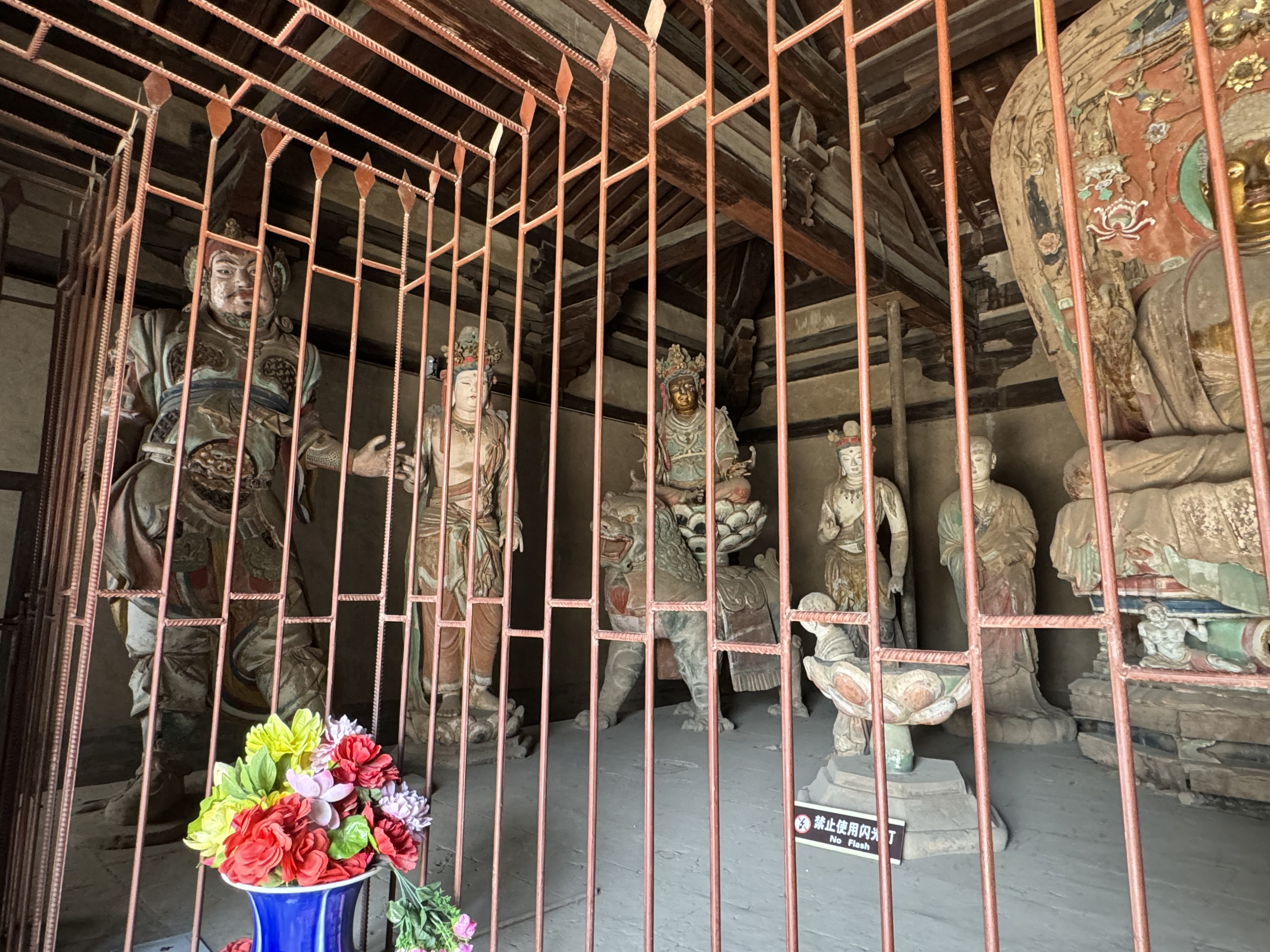
Left side of the altar

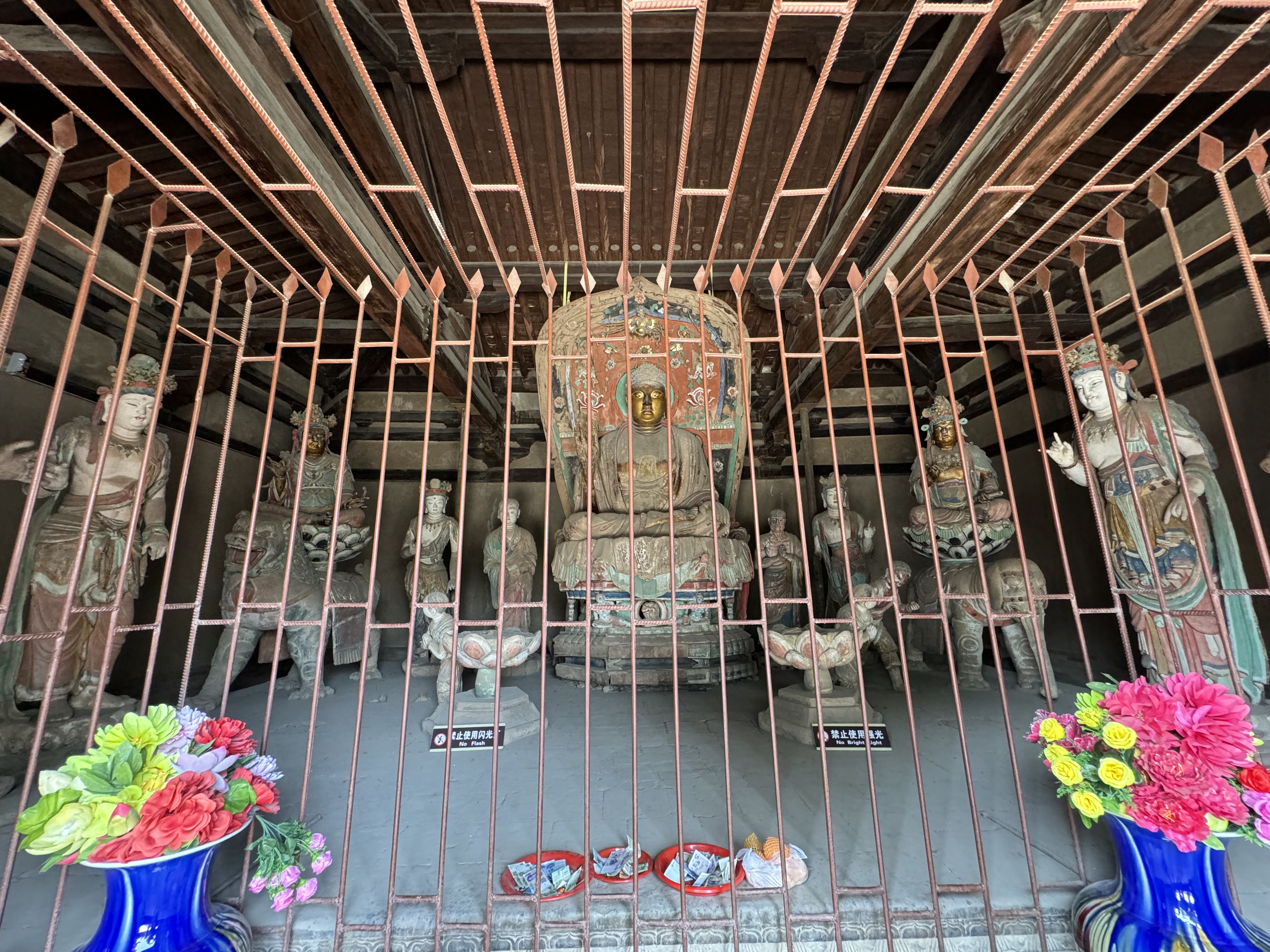
Center of the altar

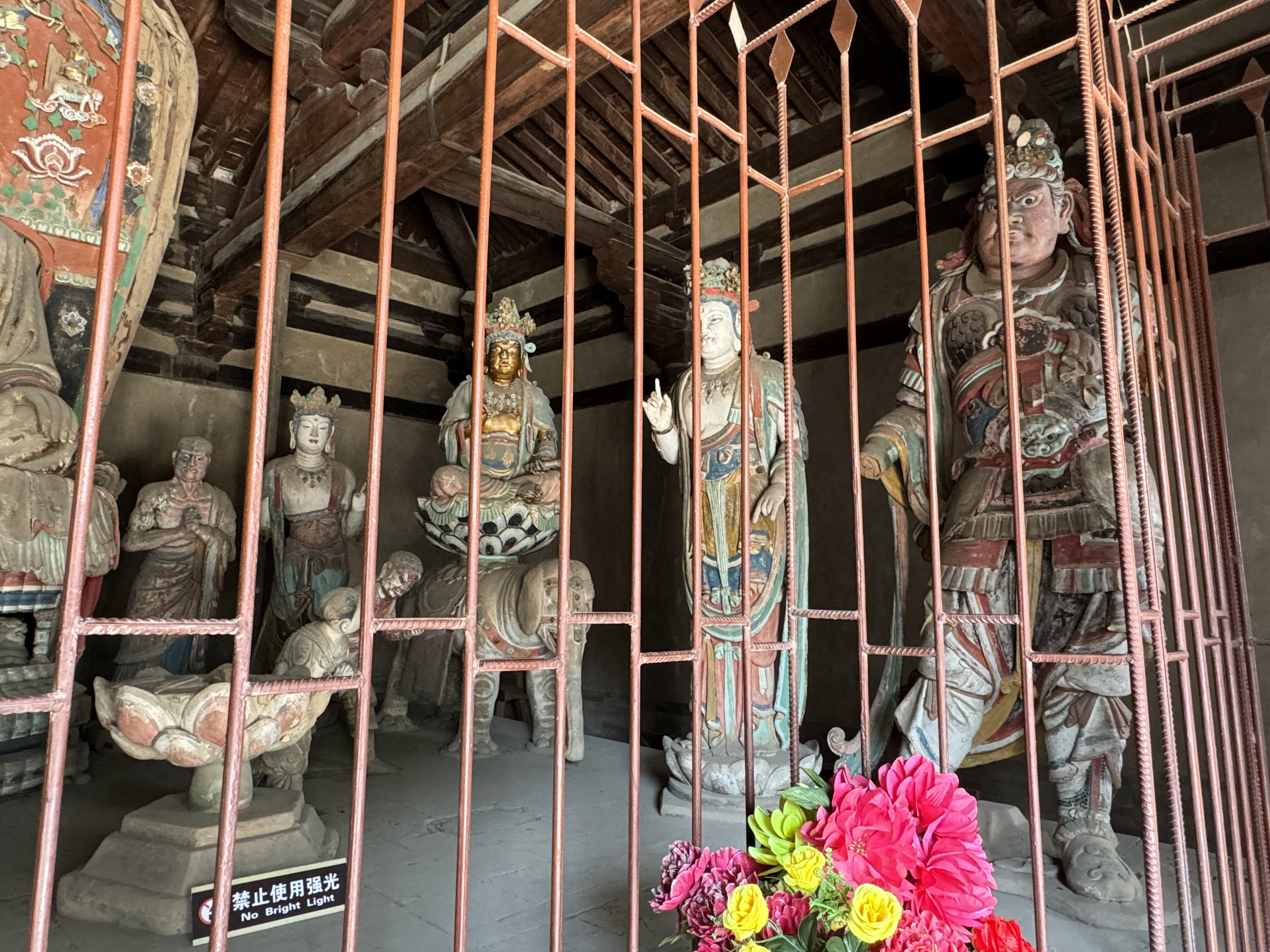
Right Side of the altar

== Restoration ==
In 1953, Nanchan Temple was discovered, and it was then—and remains today—the oldest existing wooden structure in China. At the time of its discovery, the temple was already in a state of severe disrepair, mostly due to the earthquake in 1966. Developing a restoration plan based on thorough investigation thus became an urgent task. Several restoration approaches were proposed by scholars, but suspended due to uncertainty and lack of consensus until 1973, when the restoration was officially approved and initiated the following year.

The 1974 restoration was defined as “Luo-Jia-Chong-Xiu (落架重修),” roughly translated as disassembling the entire structure and reassembling it, with the problematic parts fixed or replaced. The first part involved the reinforcement of fractured and split wooden components. The exposed sections of columns, beams, and purlins had mostly been weathered and cracked. In order to retain and continue using as many of the original wooden elements as possible, the traditional method—using metal hoops—was adopted. When splicing columns, in addition to mortise-and-tenon joints, two additional iron hoops were applied. During this restoration, alongside the continued use of traditional methods, chemical reinforcement techniques, such as the injection of epoxy resin into damaged timber, were also experimentally introduced. Preliminary inspections have shown promising results.

The dwarf pillar, which is part of the Chinese timber truss system that transfers the roof's load as compressive force to the first beam, was considered a later invention, according to studies on other buildings. In the Tang dynasty, the roof's load was initially transferred to a diagonal support called Cha-Shou, which distributed the load as tensile force to the first beam. In the case of the main hall of Nan-Chan Temple, scholars removed the dwarf pillar to reveal the structure as it was when originally built. As for the eaves, the pre-restored overhang length was quite small, which was clearly the result of later restorations, since the Tang style is known for its significantly larger overhanging eaves. Additionally, there was evidence that the eave rafters were trimmed or cut, leading scholars to calculate the original length of the rafters based on the size of the platform on which the main hall stands, and extended them to their original size.

Several methods were also adopted for strengthening the structure. The Lan-E (阑额, transverse beam) between the column heads is an original structural component used to connect and stabilize the eaves columns. Originally, the tenons at both ends of the Lan-E were straight and inserted into the columns, making them prone to dislodging during earthquakes. An iron connecting plate was nailed onto the top surface of the Lan-E at the column heads. The plate was widened where it passed through the center of each column. Both ends of the plate were firmly nailed to the Lan-E, thereby linking all the column heads around the perimeter into an integrated whole. In the original construction, there were no connecting components between the column bases. During restoration, ground beams were added inside the wall to serve as connecting elements for the column bases. Between each column, wooden supports were nailed diagonally inside the eaves wall to strengthen the frame between the columns and improve its resistance to strong seismic activity.

The most controversial aspect of the restoration project is the façade (doors and windows). The pre-restoration façade consists of two brick-arched windows and one brick-arched main entrance, a feature characteristic of later dynasties, as the use of brick in architecture was uncommon during the Tang dynasty due to the low production of bricks. According to scholarly research, parts of the wooden panels are original to the Tang dynasty, while some sections of the door show signs of saw marks, indicating that the original wooden elements were altered to accommodate the addition of bricks. Consequently, scholars decided to remove the entire brick façade and restore the original Tang-style façade, using the Fo-Guang Temple as a reference for guidance.
