= Gufo Temple =

Temple in Shanxi, China

Coordinates: 38.8815°N 113.676°E

Gufo Temple (Chinese: 古佛寺) is located on the bank of Qingshui River, Jingangku, Shanxi province, China and is the first temple to be seen if entering the Mount Wutai area from the south route. According to Mount Wutai's history, there are only records of the renovation of this temple, but nothing concerning its founding year. Thus, it is speculated "Old Buddha exists before the beginning of the world. Gufo Temple (Old Buddha Temple) exists before Mount Wutai."

== History ==
In the early 19th century, men from Jiajiang County installed a statue of Cai Lun in Gufo Temple.

== Legend ==
The bank of Qingshui River, Jingangku, is a remote area, with little burning incense. Due to lack of attention, only one clay figure of Buddha left as in Qing Dynasty, eroded by sunshine and wind, wearing away by rain and snow. As a result, the appearance of the figure was hardly recognizable, as an old saying tells "A clay idol fording a river is hardly able to save itself. " Thus, it was called Old Buddha. Then one day, Puji monk of Nanshan Temple passed by and was touched by the ruined scene. He was on his knees in front of the Old Buddha figure, saying, "Old Buddha, Old Buddha, you made me Buddha, and I'll refurbish you." Suddenly, a voice was heard, "Puji, Puji, you come to refurbish me, and I make you Buddha." Puji looked around only to see those ruins. He thought to himself, "it must have been the alive old Buddha." Then he ventured, "True Buddha is here. No need to go afar!" The voice answered again, "Yes, yes!" Therefore, Puji monk begged alms everywhere, and gathered more than 70,000 Lian silver in two years. He rebuilt this temple and named it "Gufo Temple".
