= Mimi Gurbst =

American news producer and guidance counselor

Mimi Gurbst served as the head of news coverage and vice president of the network for ABC News. In 2010, she resigned from ABC after almost 30 years of employment to become a high school guidance counselor.

== About ==
Gurbst joined ABC news in the early 1980s where she served as head of news coverage for more than two decades. In 2008, ABC promoted Gurbst to the post of Senior Producer for Diane Sawyer and World News with Charles Gibson, with responsibility for futures, features, and domestic news stories.

She left the network in 2010 to enroll in the Harvard School of Education, in the master's degree program for "Risk and Prevention," with the hopes of turning her counseling skills into a new career as a high school guidance counselor. Gurbst graduated from the Harvard in 2011 and served as a Teaching Fellow at the Harvard Graduate School of Education in 2012.

== Controversy ==
In May 2010 Gurbst became the focus of an online controversy. After ABC News announced that Gurbst was leaving the network to attend Harvard University's Graduate School for Education and pursue a career as a guidance counselor, Felix Gillette of the New York Observer wrote an article which Vanity Fair later called "somewhat fluffy."

A large number people spoke out about Gurbst's behavior and its impact on ABC News, claiming that Gurbst had been responsible for creating a toxic work culture at ABC News. Some identified themselves by name, but many posted anonymously.

=== Defense letter ===
In May 2010, Jessica Stedman Guff wrote a letter to the editor of The New York Observer in defense of Gurbst, speaking out against the negative commentary
