= Olaniyi R. Akindiya =

Nigerian visual artist

Olaniyi Rasheed Akindiya
- Born: Lagos, Nigeria
- Education: Federal University of Agriculture Abeokuta Nigeria, Institute of Textile Technology Art & Design Lagos
- Awards: Otis & Velma Davis Dozier Travel Grant Award, CORE Funding from the Cultural Art Division of Austin TX, the Innovative Artist Award from Mid America Artist Alliance (MAAA / NEA), the Pollock Krasner Foundation Award, the Cultural Initiative & Capacity Building Grant, Culture Alive Austin, The Santo Foundation Grant, and the Commonwealth Connection Award
- Website: https://www.artwithakirash.com

Olaniyi Rasheed Akindiya, also known as Akirash, is an artist from Lagos, Nigeria.

== Early life and education ==
He studied art at the Institute of Textile Technology, Arts, and Design in Oregun, Lagos State.

== Career ==
He founded the nonprofit ARTWITHAKIRASH in 2000, which invites the community to participate in his performance art.

He moved to Austin, Texas, in 2011. One example of his public performance art is his 2013 walk from CentralTrak to the Magnolia Hotel in Dallas wearing tape and water bottles. When he arrived at the Pegasus Plaza at the Magnolia Hotel: "[h]e was walking around a massive canvas covered in strips and piles of cloth and surrounded by little Ziploc bags of paint. Akirash picked one up, twisted it into the shape of an icing bag and bit the corner off, then held it about penis-level and pretended to pee color onto the canvas, swaying back and forth like a boy pissing into a lake." He then invited the crowd to participate in painting.

In 2018 Akirash installed a piece called "Masquerades Mythologies" at the Lawndale Art Center.
