= Mimi Lamote =

Belgian businesswoman

- Born: 27 April 1964 (age 62); Ostend
- Education: Master's in economics at the University of Antwerp; Master in Retail Management at the Tias University

Mimi Lamote (born Ostend, 27 April 1964) is a Belgian businesswoman. Since December 2006, she is the Chair of the Flemish Socio-economic Forum of Flanders in Action of the Flemish government. She is a member of the board of Belgacom. Mimi Lamote is married with Peter Otten and lives in Tielrode.

== Education ==
She obtained a master's in economics at the University of Antwerp and a master in Retail Management at the Tias University of Tilburg.

== Career ==
From 2001 until 2005, she was General Manager of the C&A Belgium-Luxemburg company of the Brenninkmeijer family. From 2001 until 2004, she was a member of the board of the Federation of Belgian Enterprises (VBO) and a member of the board of Fedis. From January 2005 to June 2006, she succeeded Etienne Kaesteker as CEO of the SCF retail group comprising E5-mode and Sportorama (Sint Niklaas (Belgium)) and ECG UAB/E5-Mode Baltic UAB/ Edvalda UAB (Kaunas (Lithuania)). Since 1 February 2007, she is a member of the management team of ZiekenhuisNetwerk Antwerpen (ZNA), an Antwerp hospital group. She is managing director of Eugenius BVBA.

On 2 November 2009 she starts as vice-president of Pearle Europe, working at its headquarters in Amsterdam.

2021 she is CEO of the 'slow-fashion' label Mayerline.
