= Mimi Temple =

Temple in Mount Wutai, Shanxi, China

Coordinates: 39.0778°N 113.3413°E

Mimi Temple (Chinese: 秘密寺) is located on Mimi Hill (秘密岩), Weiping Mountain, 38 kilometers southwest of Taihuai Town in Mount Wutai, Shanxi, China. It is named after the hill. Another name for the hill is Mimo (秘魔岩). So an alternative name for the temple is Mimo Temple (秘魔寺).

It was founded in the Tang dynasty.
