= Yanshan Temple =

Buddhist temple in Shanxi, China

Coordinates: 39.2291°N 113.6534°E

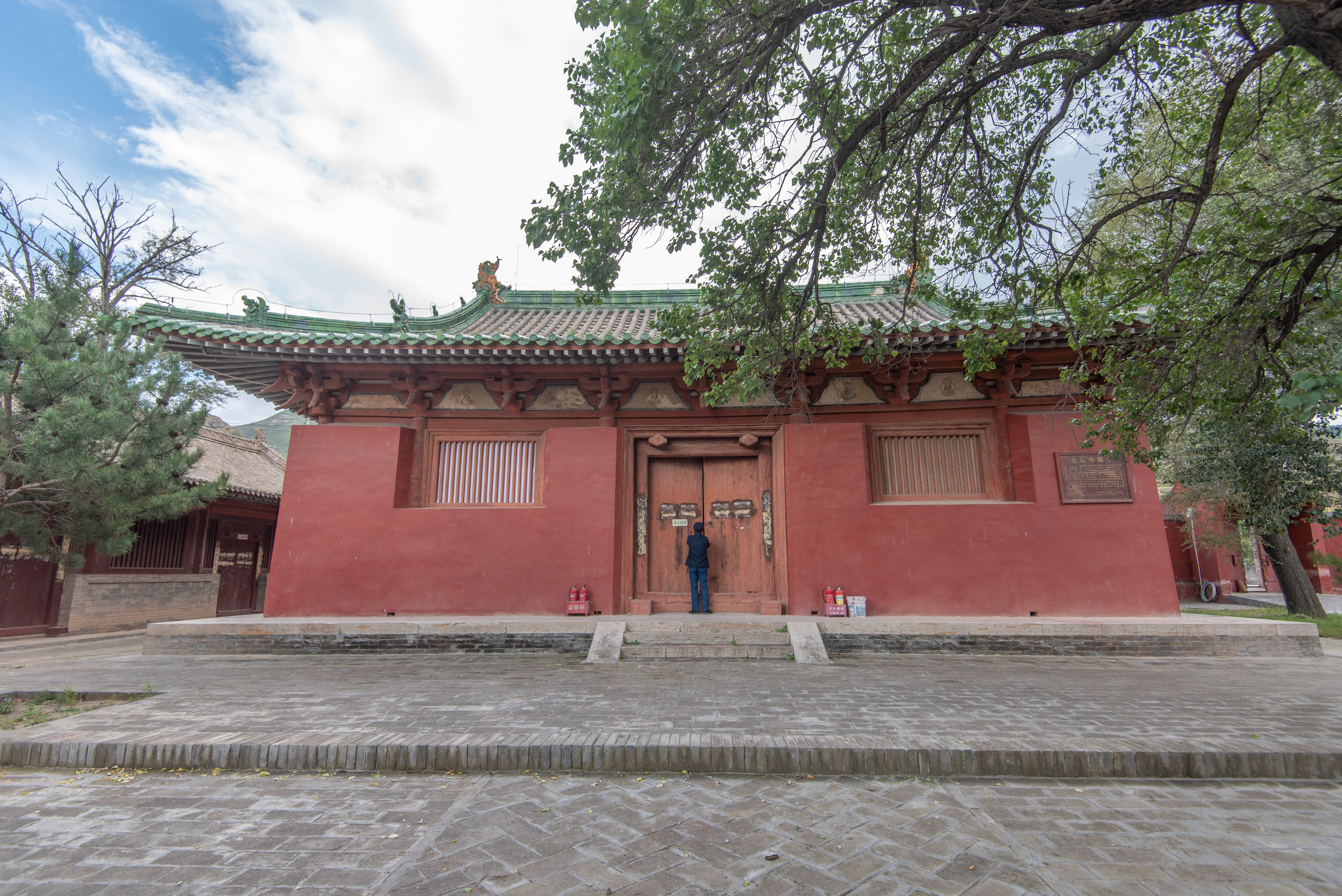

Religion
- Affiliation: Buddhism

Location
- Interactive map of Yanshan Temple

Yanshan Temple (Chinese: 岩山寺; pinyin: yán shān sì) is a preserved location of national historical and cultural relics. It used to be named Lingyan Temple (灵岩寺). It is located in Tianyan Village of north side of Mount Wutai, Yukou, south of Fanshi County, Shanxi Province of China.

It was founded in Zhenglong 3rd year (1158), Jin dynasty, and renovated in Yuan, Ming, and Qing dynasties.
