= Chaoyang Road (Beijing) =

Road in Beijing, China

Chaoyang Road 朝阳路
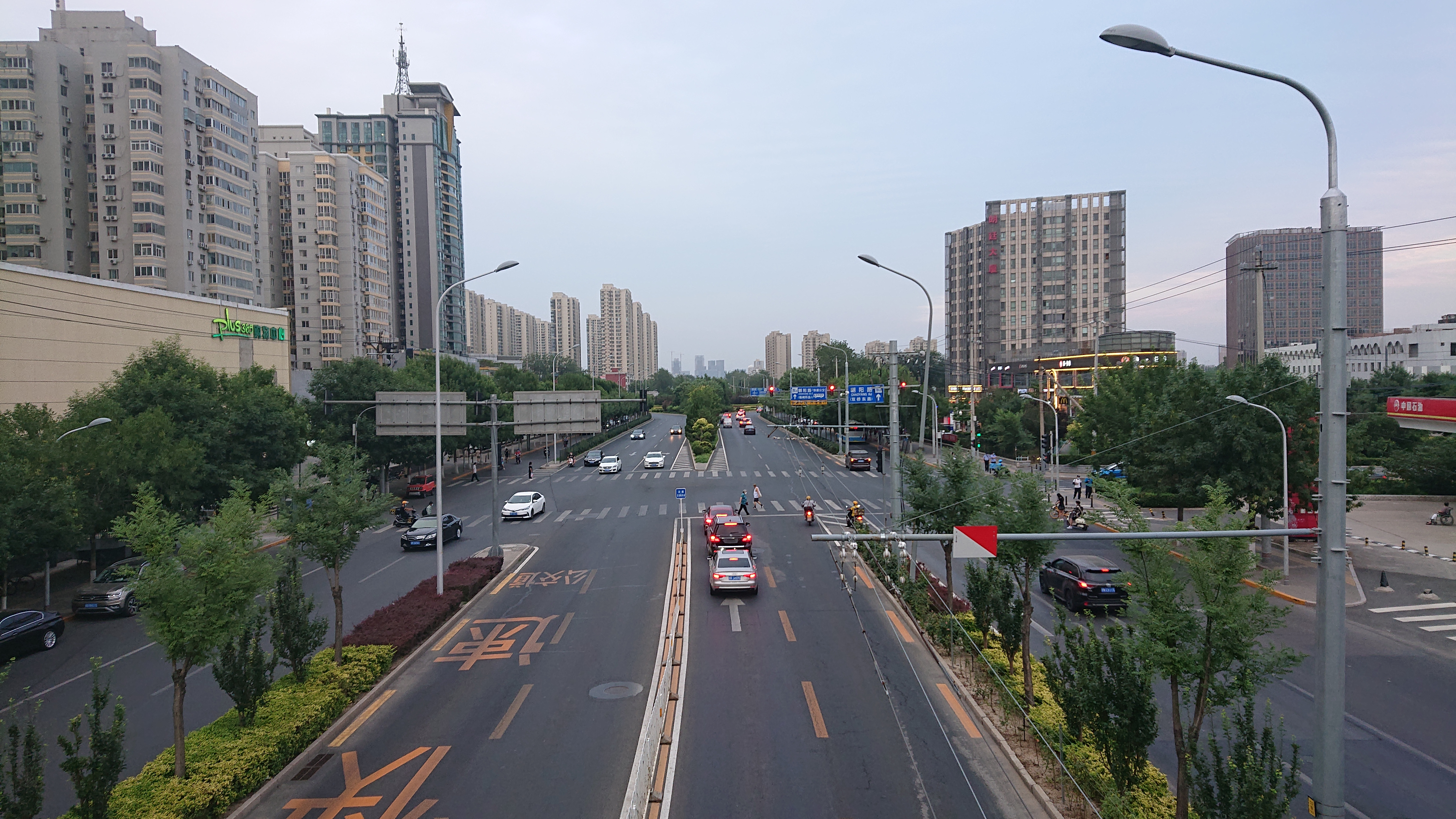
- Chaoyang Road in June 2020

Route information
- Length: 17 km (11 mi)

Major junctions
- West end: East 3rd Ring Road
- Chaoyangmen Outer Street; East 4th Ring Road; East 5th Ring Road; CCTV Building; People's Daily headquarters; Communication University of China; Beijing International Studies University; second expressway of Beijing Airport; Balizhuang; Shuangqiao
- East end: Tongzhou District

Location
- Country: China

Highway system
- Transport in China

Chaoyang Road (simplified Chinese: 朝阳路; traditional Chinese: 朝陽路; pinyin: Cháoyáng Lù) is a major east–west road in the east of the Beijing city. The road is circa 17 km long, stretching from the East 3rd Ring Road into the Tongzhou District as an auxiliary road to the Jingtong Expressway. It connects the Chaoyangmen Outer Street and the Jingha Expressway, crossing East 4th Ring Road, East 5th Ring Road and the second expressway of Beijing Airport. It also runs through Balizhuang, Guanzhuang and Shuangqiao regions. The CCTV Building, People's Daily headquarters, Communication University of China and Beijing International Studies University are alongside Chaoyang Road.

Chaoyang Road was historically a business street in Beijing. Due to transportation problems, it gradually lost the luster in modern times. Since the road conditions and related infrastructure have been improved in recent years, it starts to become once again attractive to investors.
