= Zhihua Temple =

Ming dynasty-era Buddhist temple in Beijing, China

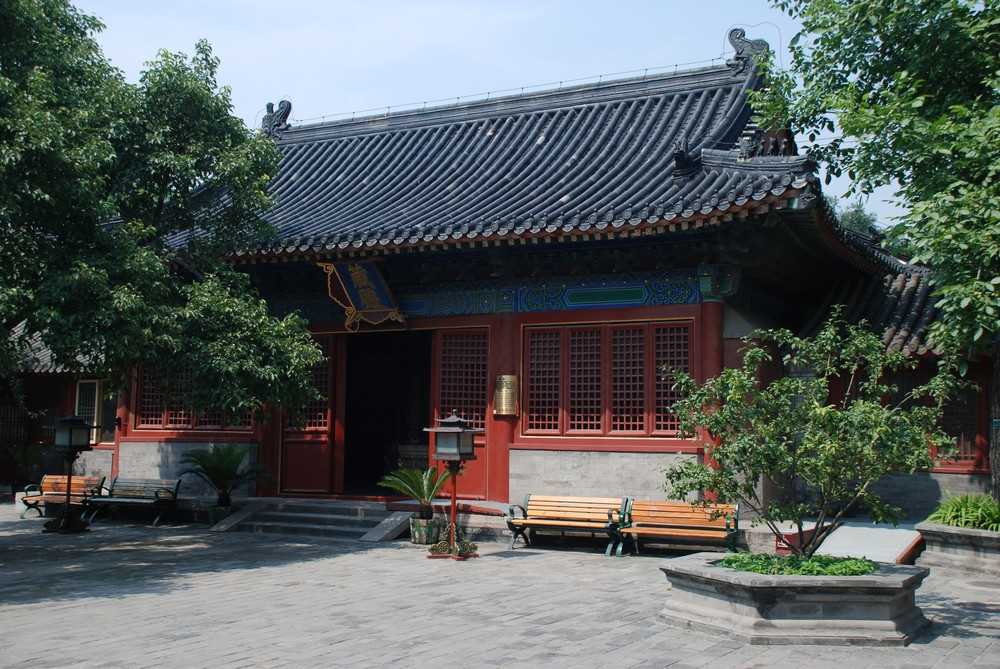
- Buddhist Texts Library of the temple

Religion
- Affiliation: Buddhism

Location
- Location: Beijing
- Country: China
- Interactive map of Zhihua Temple
- Coordinates: 39.9162°N 116.4259°E

The Zhihua Temple (Chinese: 智化寺; pinyin: Zhìhuà Sì; lit. 'Temple of Wisdom Attained') is a Ming dynasty-era Buddhist temple in Beijing, China. It is located in the Lumicang (禄米仓) hutong, in the Chaoyangmen area of Dongcheng District, within the Second Ring Road to the north of Jinbaojie Street, west of the Yabaolu area. The temple was built in 1443 at the order of Wang Zhen, a powerful eunuch in the Rites Supervising Office of the court of the Zhengtong Emperor (also known as Emperor Yingzong; reigned 1436-1449 and 1457–1464).

The temple, surrounding buildings, and grounds comprise approximately 2 hectares (4.9 acres). It is one of the most important original building complexes that has remained intact since the Ming dynasty period in the Old City area of Beijing. It is also striking for its extensive use of black roof tiles. The Beijing Cultural Exchange Museum, established in November 1992, is located in the temple compound; its principal aim is "as a centre for developing cultural exchange and for developing the study of cultural relics and museums."

At the temple, a group of musicians regularly performs centuries-old ritual music which has been handed down over 27 generations. The six-member group was led by the octogenarian Buddhist monk Zhang Benxing (张本兴, 1923–2009), the only surviving member of the 26th generation of musicians, and the last person to have learned the music in the traditional manner. In addition to singing voices, the instruments used include guanzi (oboe), dizi (bamboo flute), sheng (mouth organ), yunluo (a set of ten small tuned gongs mounted vertically in a frame), and percussion including drums and cymbals.

The Zhihua Temple became a nationally preserved cultural and historic relic in 1961. In 2005 the Chinese government undertook a renovation of the temple (which is now complete) in preparation for the numerous international visitors expected at the time of the 2008 Summer Olympics.

== Layout ==
The structures of the temple mostly date to the Ming dynasty.

=== Shanmen ===
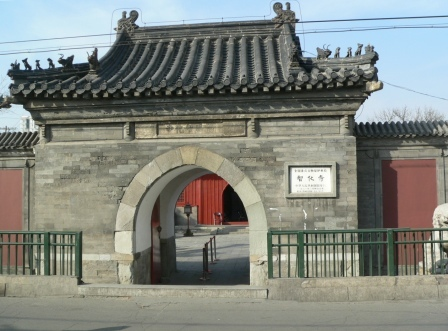
Shanmen of the temple

The shanmen (Chinese: 山門; Pinyin: Shānmén) of Zhihua Temple dates to the Ming dynasty. It consists of a single archways 7.10 meters wide and 5 meters long, with a single-eaved xieshan-style roof. A white marble plaque is embedded on the top of the gate, which is inscribed with the words "敕賜智化寺" in traditional Chinese characters, meaning "Gifted by the Imperial Court to Zhihua Temple". The left and right sides of the shanmen are also inscribed with Chinese characters; the left inscription reads "正九年正月初九日奉旨敕建", which means "Built under Imperial order on the 9th day of the 1st lunar month of the 9th year of the reign of the Zhengde Emperor", while right inscription reads "萬曆五年三月三日司禮監管監事兼掌內府供用庫印提督禮儀房太監鄭真等重修", which means "Rebuilt by the eunuch Zheng Zhen, the Master of Ceremonies who oversees the inner palace and the ceremonial room, as well as others in the 3rd day of the 3rd month of 5th year of the reign of the Wanli Emperor". Two Chinese guardian lions guard both sides of this gate.

=== Zhihua Gate ===
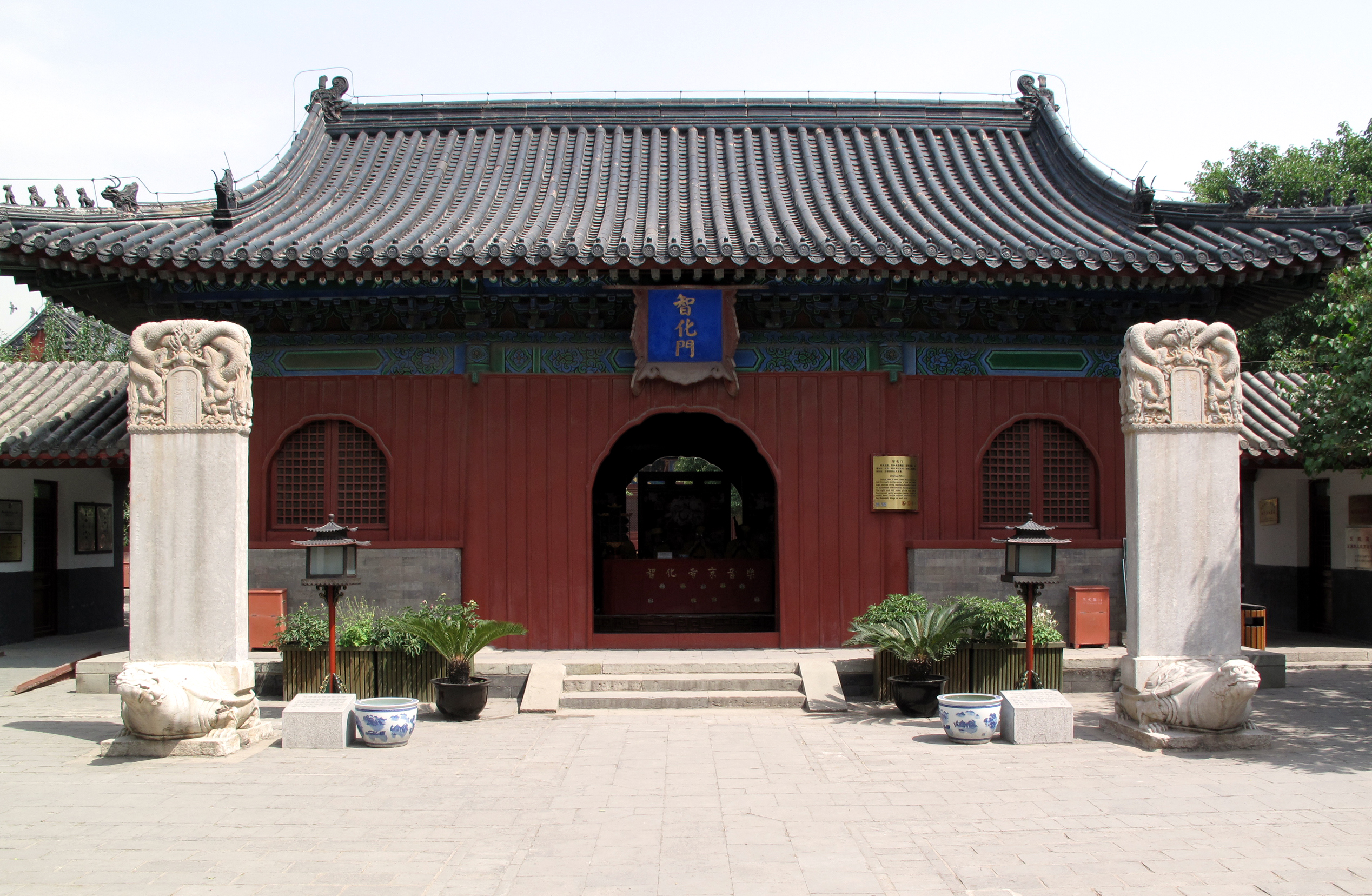
Zhihua Gate of the temple

The Zhihua Gate (Chinese: 智化門; Pinyin: Zhìhuàmén) of the temple is a building structure equivalent to the Tianwang Dian, or Hall of the Four Heavenly Kings, in most Chinese Buddhist temples. It has a width of 13 meters and a length of 7.8 meters. The building, which was built during the Ming dynasty, originally enshrined statues of Mi Le, the deva Weituo and the Four Heavenly Kings, but they are not extant now. It now houses an exhibition of the history of the Zhihua Temple, and the temple's ritual musicians regularly hold their performances within this building. Several steeles dating to the Ming dynasty which commemorates past donors of the temple are also housed within this building.

=== Bell Tower ===
The Bell Tower (Chinese: 鐘樓; Pinyin: Zhōnglóu) is located on the east side outside the Zhihua Gate and consists of two floors. It houses a bronze bell, which was cast during the Ming dynasty in the 9th year of the reign of the Emperor Yingzong (1444). The bell has a diameter of 1.05 meters, a height of 1.60 meters, and a thickness of 9 cm. The surface of the bell is inscribed with mantras written in the Sanskrit script.

=== Drum Tower ===
The Drum Tower (Chinese: 鼓樓; Pinyin: Gǔlóu) is located on the west side outside Zhihua Gate and also consists of two floors. It houses a Ming dynasty drum, which has a height of 1.45 meters and a diameter of 1.37 meters. The surface of the drum is inscribed with a lacquer pattern composing of 12 golden dragons prancing.

=== Zhihua Hall ===
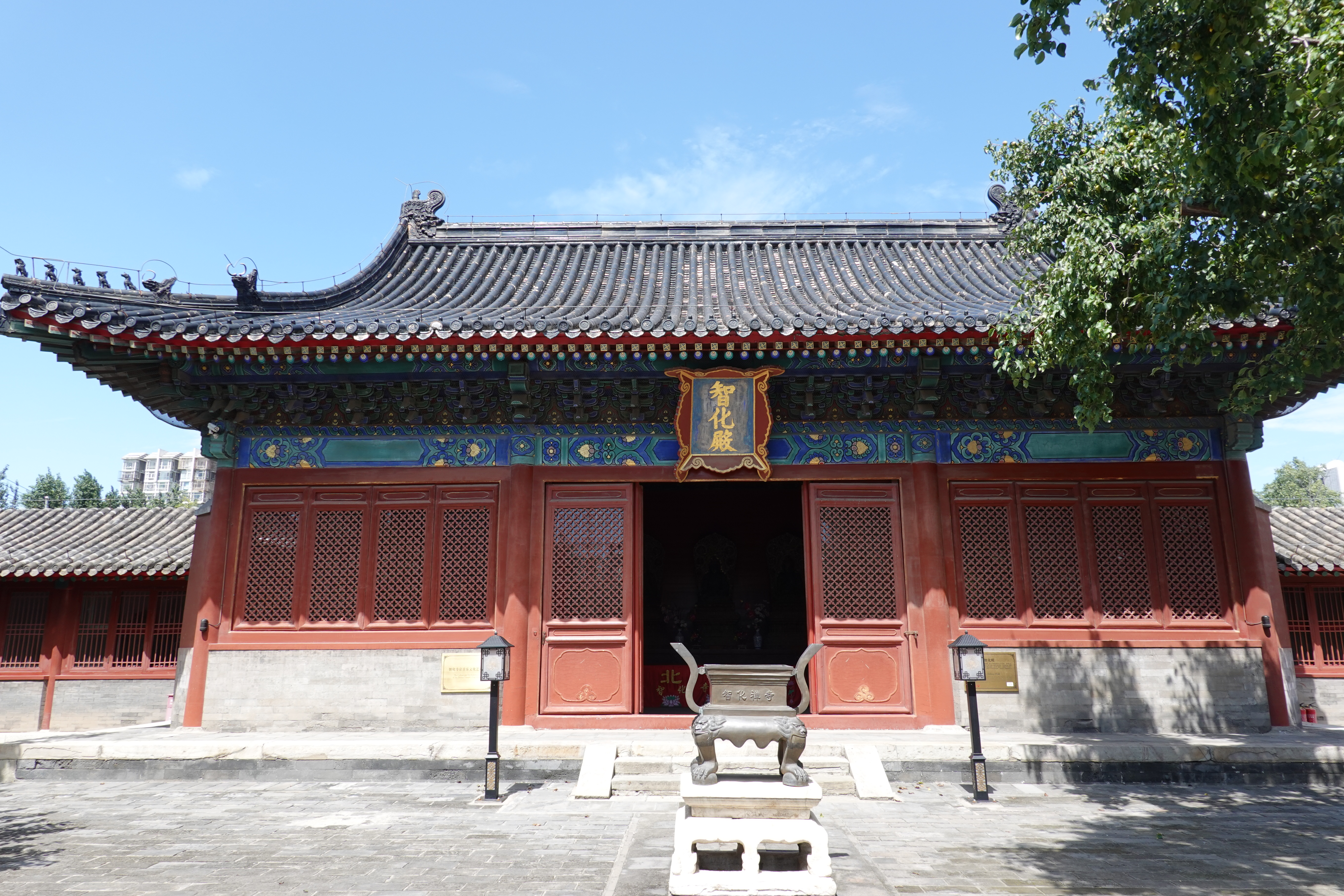
Exterior of the Zhihua Hall

The Zhihua Hall (Chinese: 智化殿; Pinyin: Zhìhuàdiàn) of the temple is a building structure equivalent to the Daxiongbao Hall in most Chinese Buddhist temples. It dates back to the Ming dynasty and enshrines numerous Ming dynasty statues of various Buddhas, Bodhisattvas and dharmapalas. In 1972, three wooden lacquered gold statues of the Buddhas Shijiamoni, Yaoshi and Amituofo (each seated on a marble lotus throne) as well as statues of the Eighteen Arhats which were originally enshrined in this hall were moved to the Daxiongbao Hall of Dajue Temple in Beijing (after the Buddha statues originally enshrined in the Daxiongbao Hall of Dajue Temple had in turn been moved to Guangji Temple).

In modern times, the temple enshrines another set of Ming dynasty statues of the Buddhas Shijiamoni, Yaoshi and Amituofo (which were originally enshrined in the Hall of Great Compassion), as well as various other Buddhist figures such as Weituo, Qielan and several arhats. The walls of the hall are also painted with Ming dynasty murals featuring the bodhisattva Dizang, Yanluo Wang, the Ten Kings of Hell and other Buddhist figures. The mural is 3.14 meters high, 4.7 meters wide, and occupies a total area of 14.76 square meters.

=== Tathagata Hall and Thousand Buddha Pavilion ===
The Tathagata Hall (Chinese: 如来殿; Pinyin: Rúláidiàn) and Thousand Buddha Pavilion (Chinese: 萬佛閣; Pinyin: Wànfogé) are located in a single building, with the Tathagata Hall making up the first floor and the Thousand Buddha Pavilion making up the second floor. The dimensions of the Tathagata Hall measures 19 meters by 12.6 meters wide. It enshrines a Ming dynasty statues of Shijiamoni in the centre, flanked by statues of Dishitian and Fantian. The Thousand Buddha Pavilion enshrines statues of the three bodies of the Buddha under the Trikaya doctrine: Piluzhena (Vairocana), Lushena (Rocana) and Shijiamoni (Shakyamuni). The walls of the pavilion are lined with niches enshrining small statues of a total of 9,999 Buddhas, which gives the pavilion its name. A Ming Dynasty copper incense burner is placed outside the gate of this building.

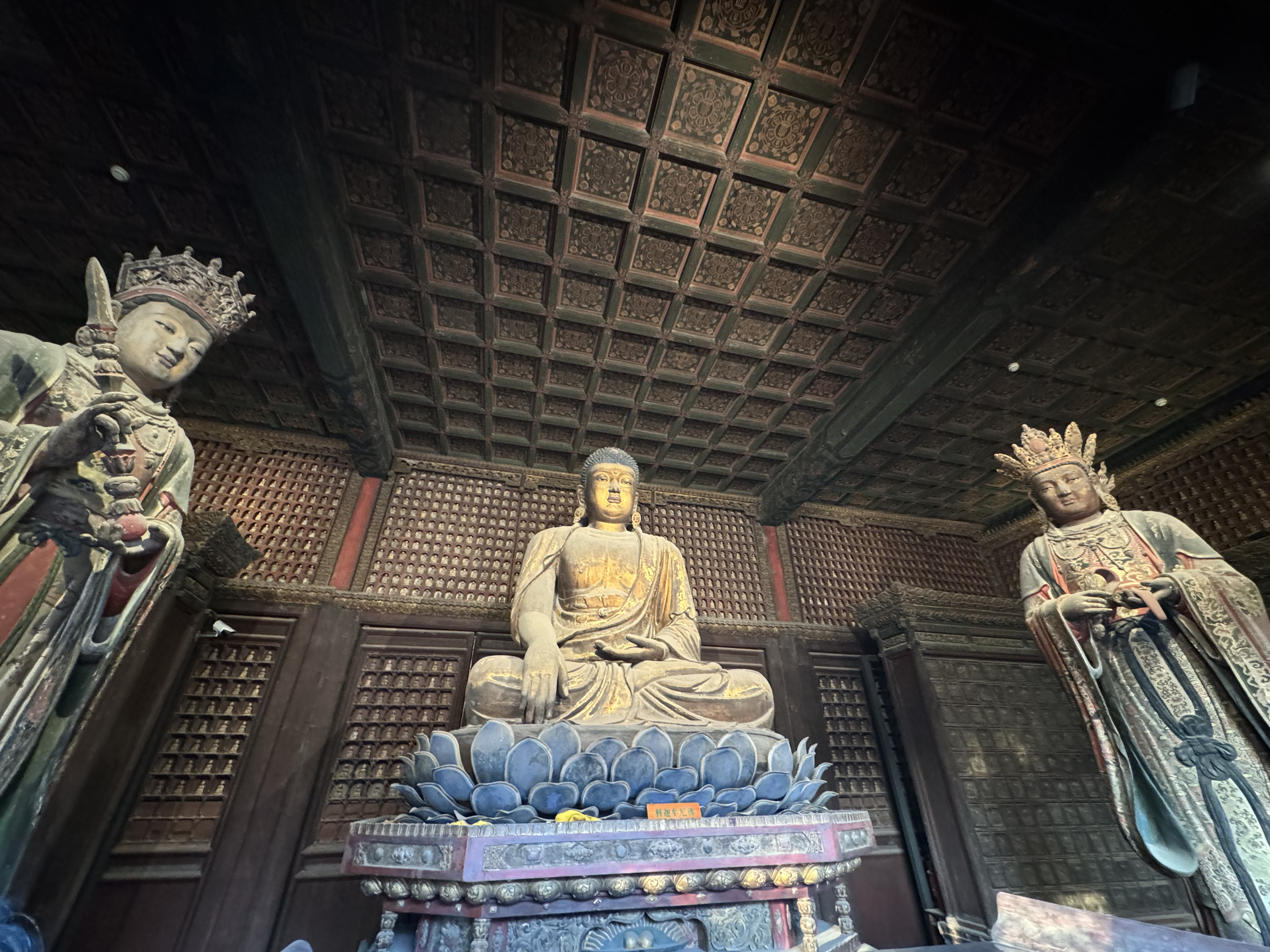
Interior of the building

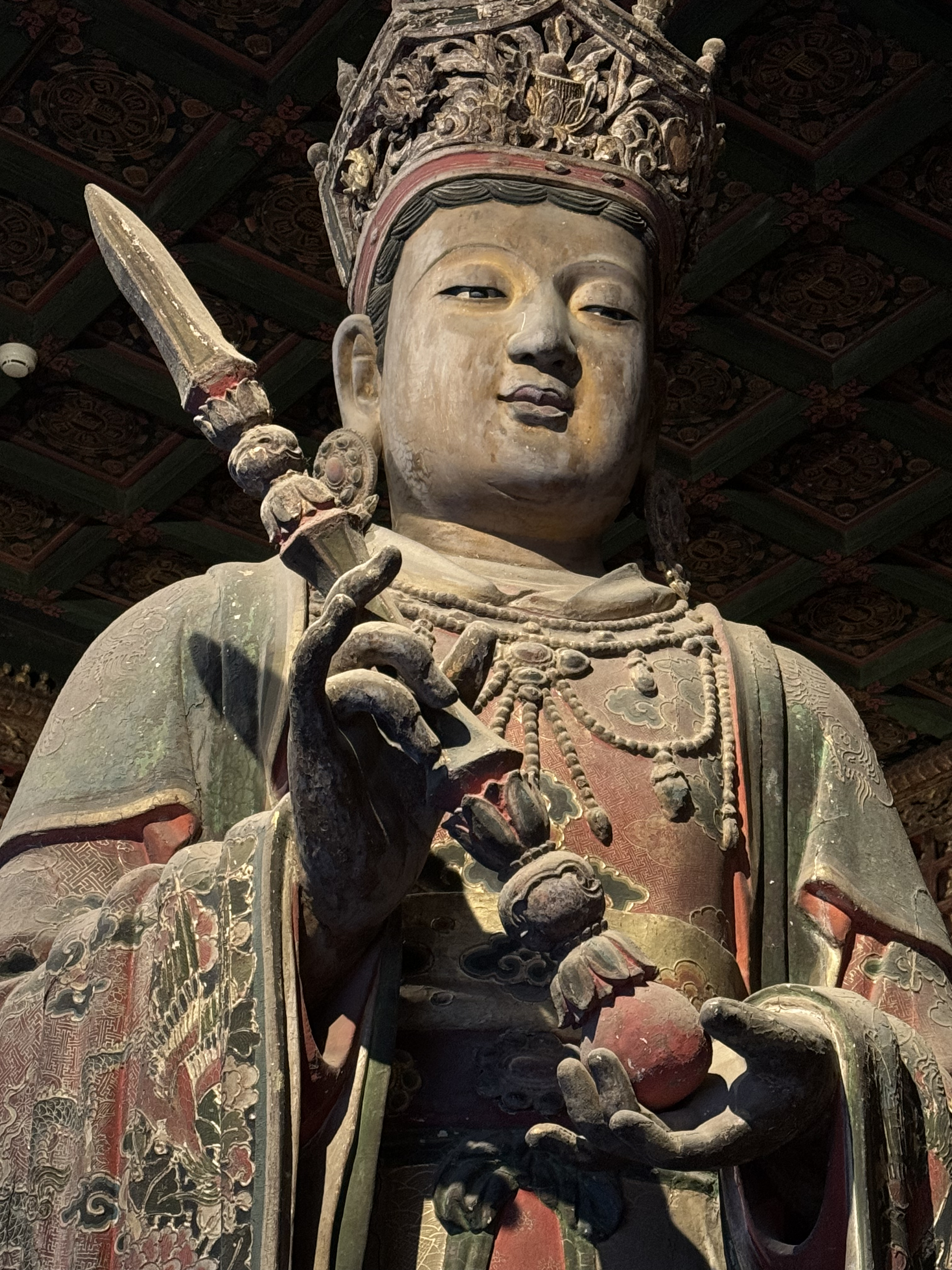
Close up image of Dishitian

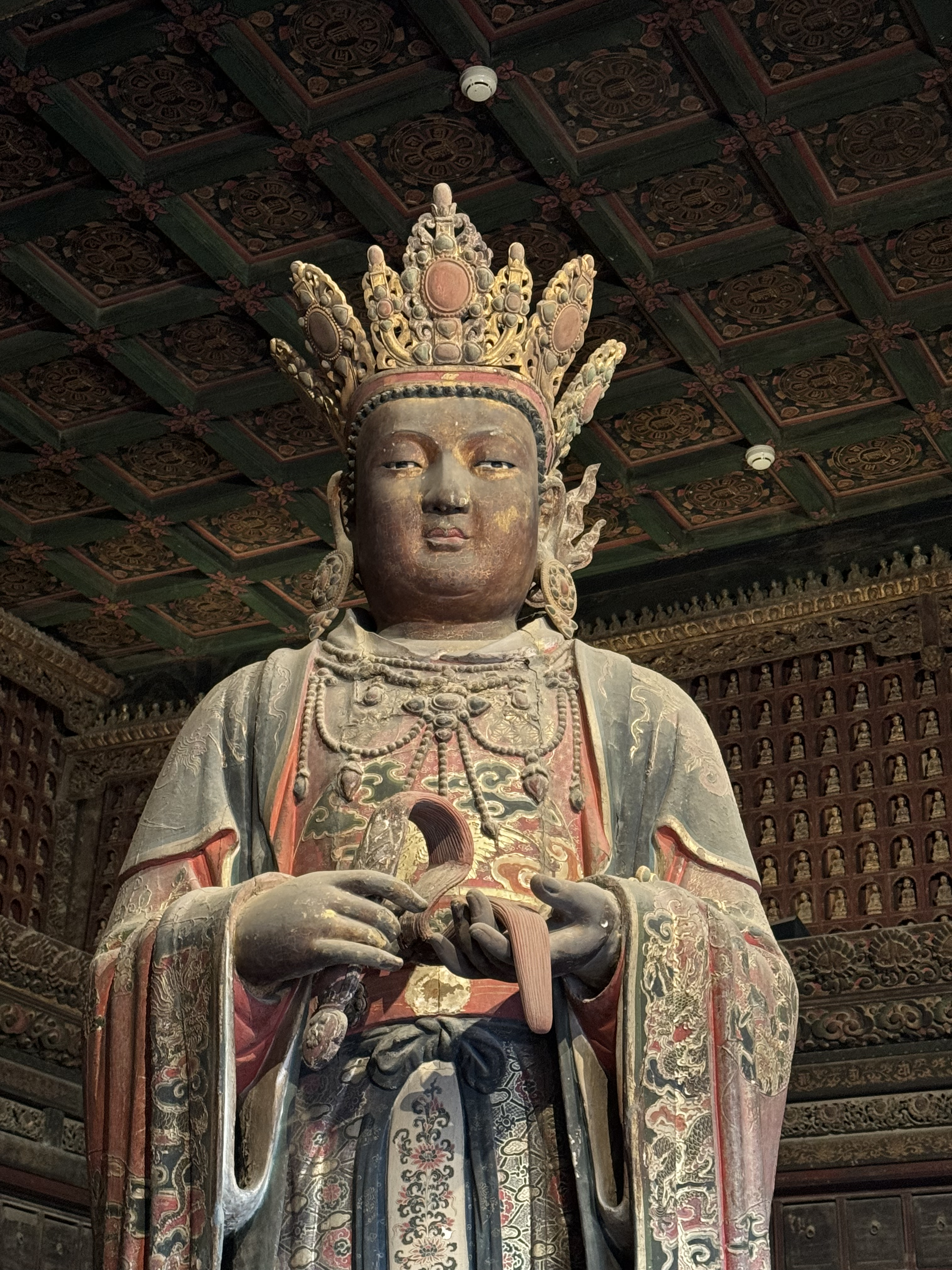
Close up image of Fantian

=== Zangjing Ge ===
The Zangjing Ge, or the Tower of Buddhist Texts (Chinese: 蔵經閣; Pinyin: Cángjīnggé), is located on the west side of the Zhihua Hall. It mainly houses a Ming dynasty Zhuanlunzang (simplified Chinese: 转轮藏; traditional Chinese: 轉輪藏; pinyin: Zhuànlúnzàng, a rotating wooden sutra cabinet). The Zhuanlunzang is octagonal in shape and measures more than 4 metres in height. The Zhuanlunzang's bottom portion is engraved with carvings of the Eight Legions, the middle portion is engraved with carvings of Bodhisattvas, the Four Heavenly Kings, Weituo and vajra-warriors and the top portion is engraved with carvings of Piluzhena, nagas and garuda.

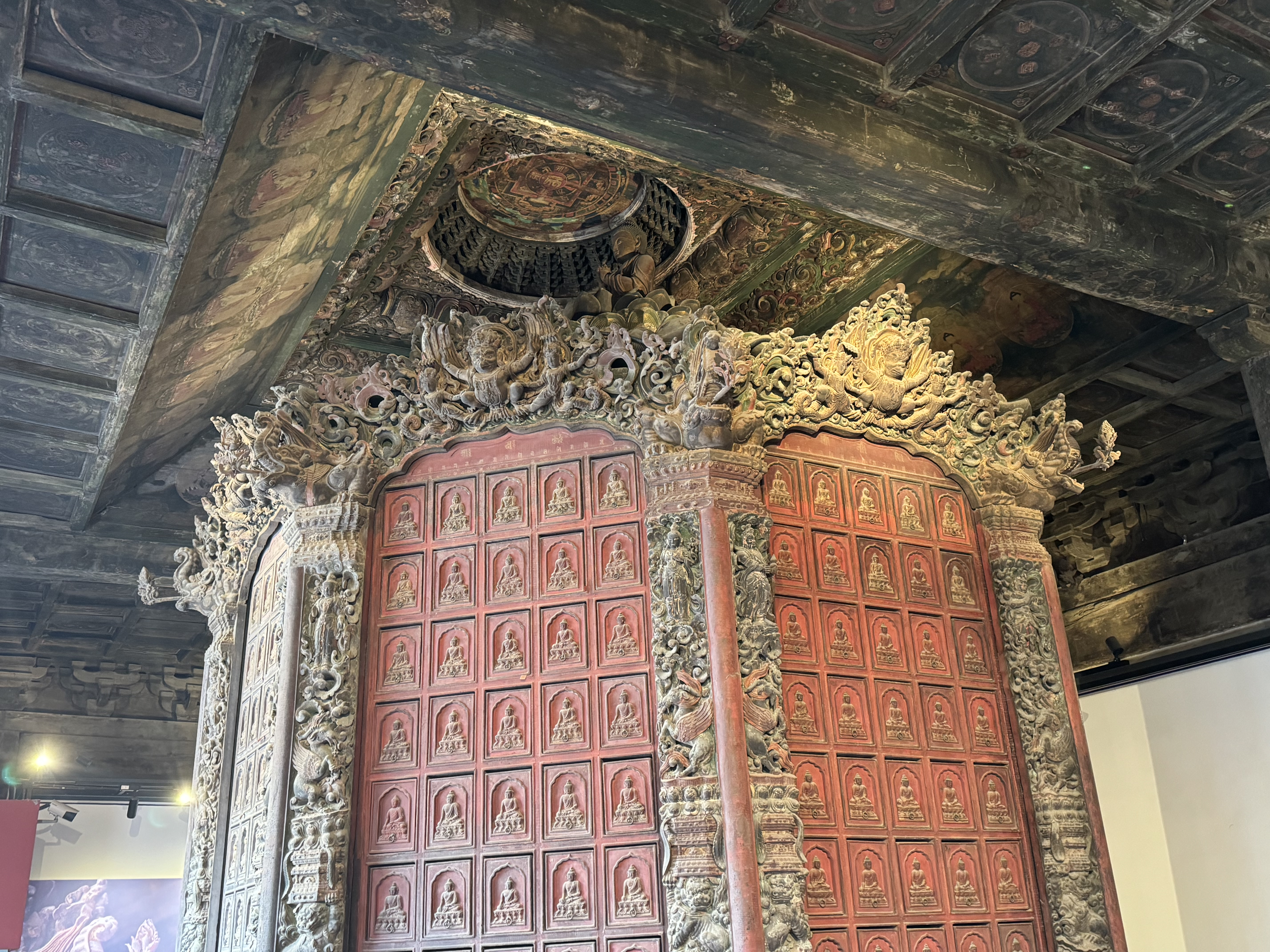
轉輪藏/Rotating wooden sutra cabinet

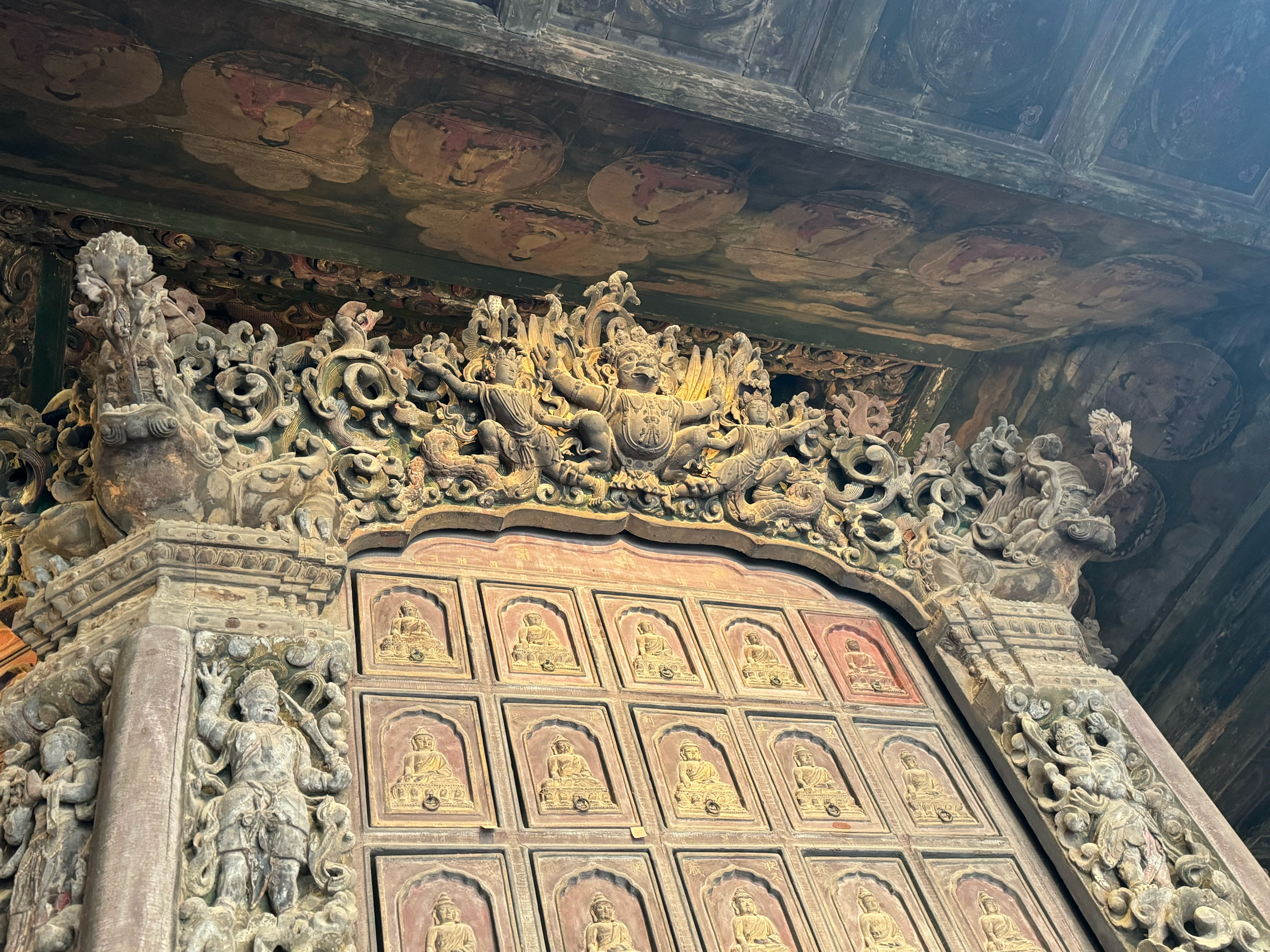
Close up image of the carving

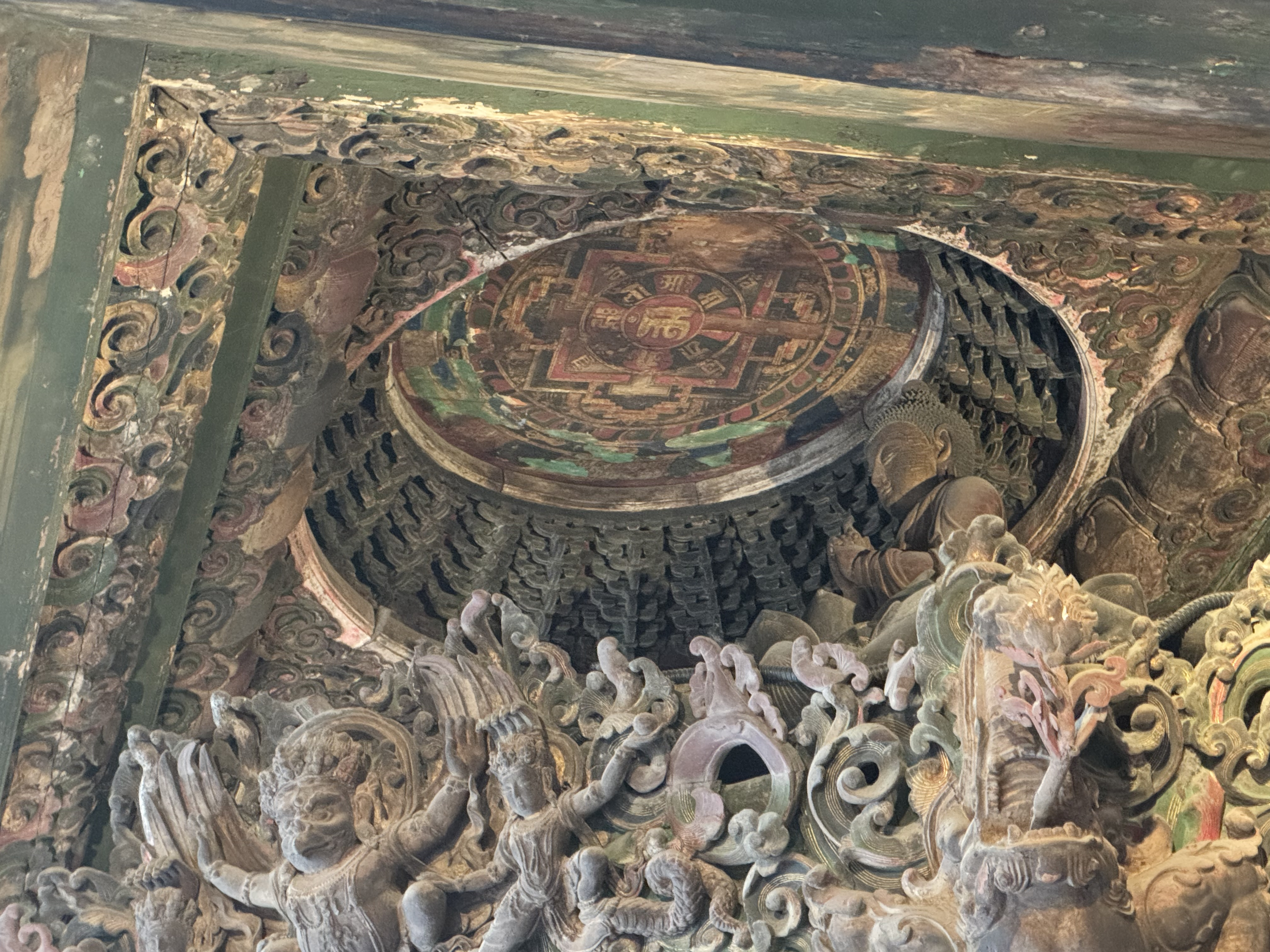
Piluzhena Buddha sitting on the top of the cabinet
