= Jianwai Subdistrict =

Jianwai Subdistrict 建外街道
- Subdistrict
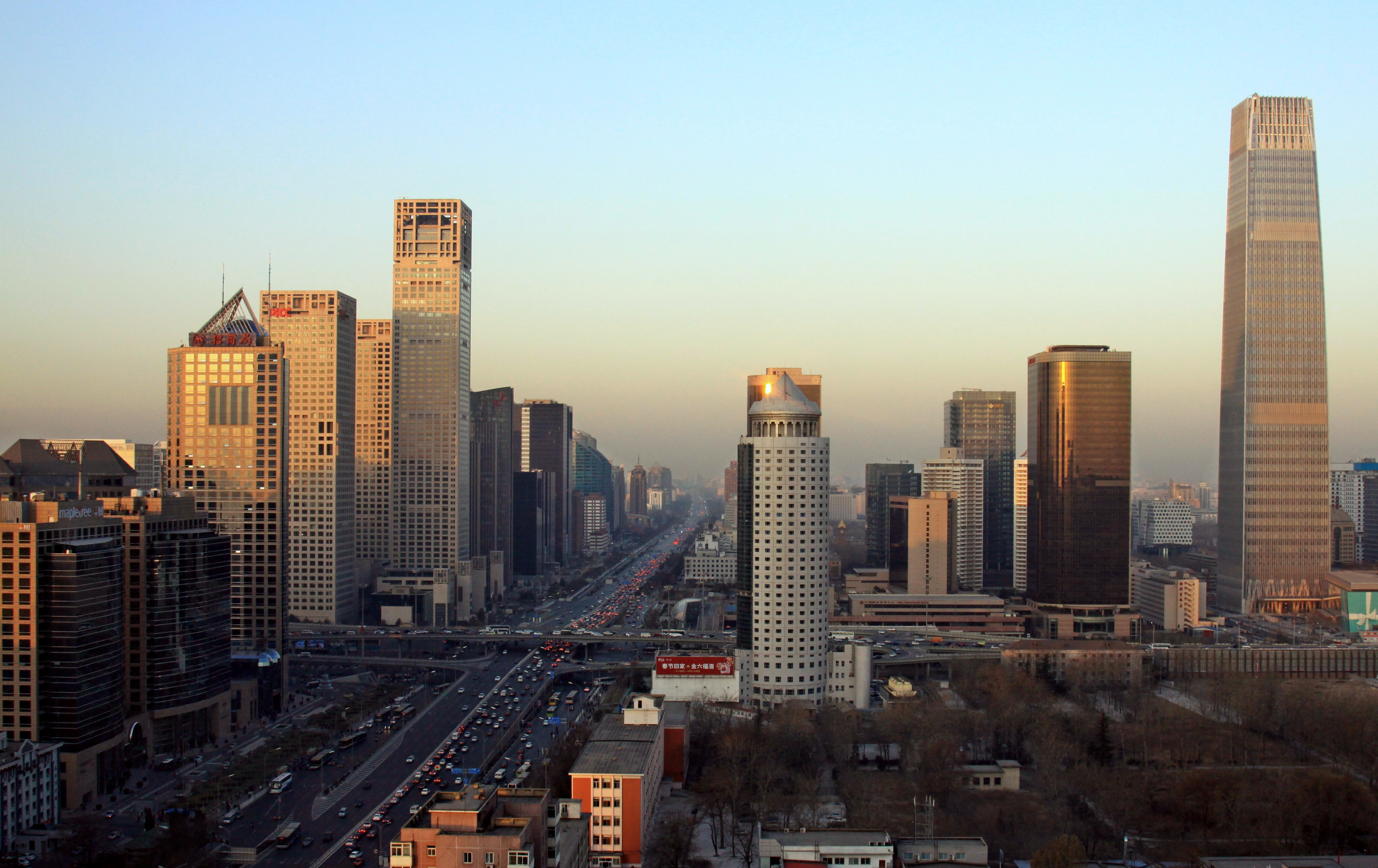
- Guomao Bridge, on the border of the subdistrict, 2009

- Location within Beijing Location within China
- Coordinates: 39°54′39″N 116°26′51″E
- Country: China
- Municipality: Beijing
- District: Chaoyang
- Village-level Divisions: 9 communities

Area
  - Total: 4.4 km^{2} (1.7 sq mi)

Population (2020)
  - Total: 36,414
  - Density: 8,300/km^{2} (21,000/sq mi)
- Time zone: UTC+8 (China Standard)
- Postal code: 100022
- Area code: 010

Jianwai Subdistrict (Chinese: 建外街道; pinyin: Jiànwài Jiēdào) is a subdistrict on the western side of Chaoyang District, Beijing, China. It borders Hujialou and Chaowai Subdistricts to the north, Balizhuang Subdistrict and Gaobeidian Township to the east, Shuangjing Subdistrict to the south, Jianguomen and Chaoyangmen Subdistricts to the west. As of 2020, it has a total population of 36,414.

The name of this subdistrict is an abbreviation of Jianguomenwai Subdistrict (Chinese: 建国门外街道; lit. 'District Outside of Jianguomen'), referring to its location outside of Jianguomen and the former Beijing city wall.

== History ==
Timeline of changes in the status of Jianwai
| Time | Status | |
|---|---|---|
| Ming and Qing dynasty | Part of Daxing County | |
| 1925 | Part of 2nd Suburban District | |
| 1949 | Part of 14th District, contained two subdivisions | |
| 1952 | Part of East Suburban District | |
| 1954 | Formally divided, western part became Dongbianmen Subdistrict | Formally divided, eastern part became Qishengmiao Township |
| 1955 | Transferred to Dongdan District | Transferred to Dongdan District |
| 1956 | Dongbianmen Subdistrict | Part of Xiaozhuang Subdistrict |
| 1959 | Incorporated into Chaowai Dajie Subdistrict | Part of Xiaozhuang Subdistrict |
| 1960 | Part of Chaowai commune | Part of Xiaozhuang commune |
| 1968 | Reverted to a subdistrict | Part of Dazhailu Subdistrict |
| 1976 | Merged into Jianwai Subdistrict, excluding land south of Guanghua Road. | |

== Administrative Division ==
At the end of 2021, there are a total of 9 communities under Jianwai Subdistrict:

| Administrative Division Code | Community Name in English | Community Name in Simplified Chinese |
|---|---|---|
| 110105001024 | Nanlang Jiayuan | 南郎家园 |
| 110105001025 | Beilang Jiayuan | 北郎家园 |
| 110105001026 | Yong'anli | 永安里 |
| 110105001027 | Guanghuali | 光华里 |
| 110105001028 | Jianguoli | 建国里 |
| 110105001029 | Xiushui | 秀水 |
| 110105001033 | Beilangdong | 北郎东 |
| 110105001034 | Yong'anlidong | 永安里东 |
| 110105001035 | Dabei Jiayuan | 大北家园 |
