= Chaowai Subdistrict =

Chaowai Subdistrict 朝外街道
- Subdistrict
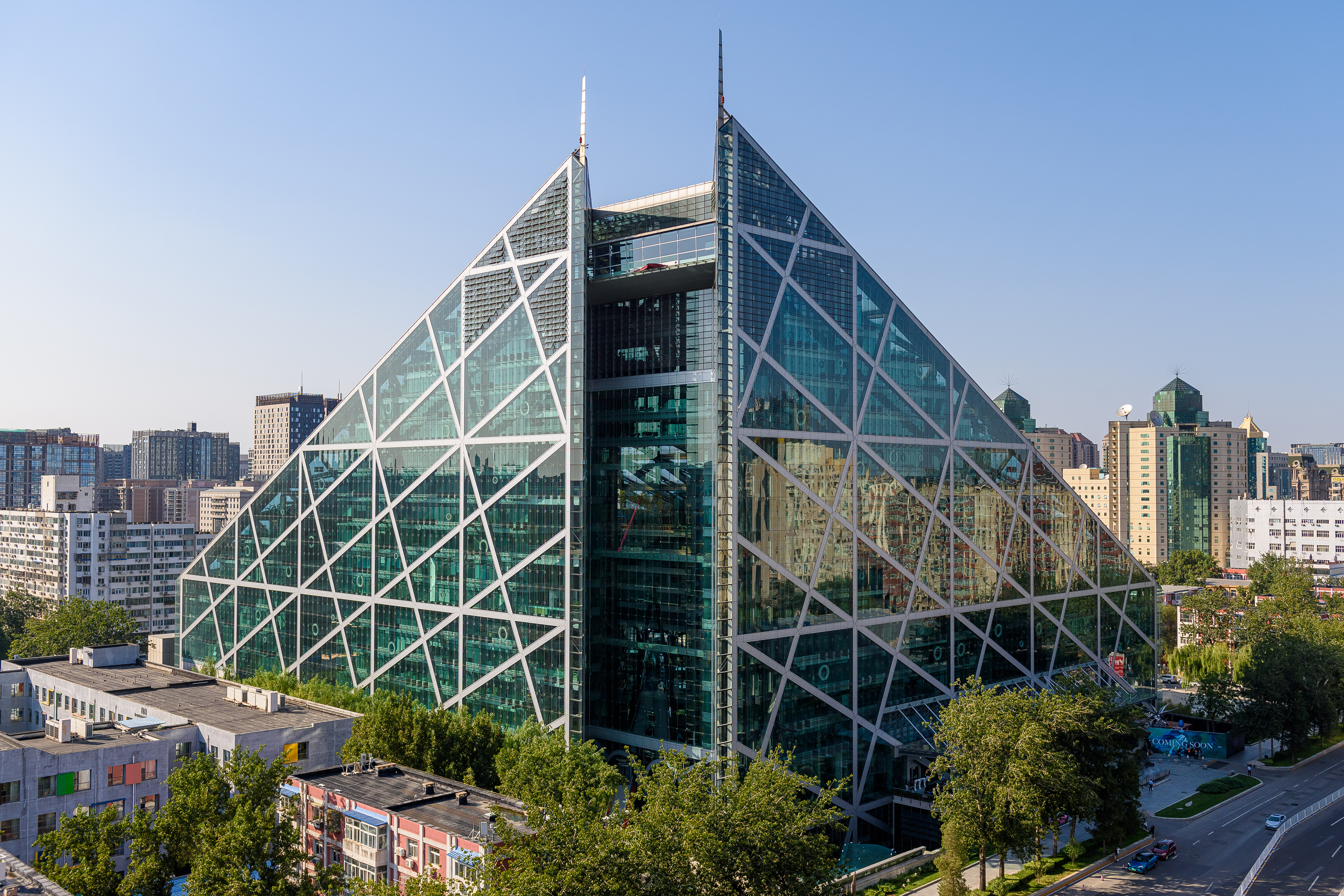
- Parkview Green in Fangcaodi Community, 2021

- Location within Beijing Location within China
- Country: China
- Municipality: Beijing
- District: Chaoyang

Area
  - Total: 2.2 km^{2} (0.85 sq mi)

Population (2020)
  - Total: 33,212
  - Density: 15,000/km^{2} (39,000/sq mi)
- Time zone: UTC+8 (China Standard)
- Postal code: 100020
- Area code: 010

Chaowai Subdisrict (Chinese: 朝外街道; pinyin: Cháowài Jiēdào) is a subdistrict inside Chaoyang District, Beijing, China. It is bordering Sanlitun Subdistrict and Dongzhimen Subdistrict to the north, Hujialou Subdistrict to the east, Jianwai Subdistrict to the south, Dongsi, Chaoyangmen and Jianguomen Subdistricts to the west. It has a total population of 33,212 as of the 2020 census.

The name of this subdistrict refers to the area to the east (i.e. "outside" of) Chaoyangmen Gate of Ming city wall.

== History ==
Timeline of the status of Chaowai Subdistrict
Time	Status
1949	Named Chaoyangmen Guanxiang Prefecture. Has the following subdivisions: Chaoyangmen Guanxiangjie; Shichangjie; Shenlujie
1954	The 3 prefectures became their own subdistricts
1955	Under administration of Dongdan District
1958	Under administration of Chaoyang District
1959	Chaowai Dajie, Shichangjie, Shenlujie, Dongbianmen and Xingfucun Subdistricts merged to form Chaowai Dajie Subdistrict. Changed to a commune at the end of 1959.
1966	The commune was disbanded and subdistrict status was restored.
1990	Name changed from Chaowai Dajie Subdistrict to Chaowai Subdistrict.

== Administrative Division ==
As of 2021, there are 7 communities within the subdistrict:

Administrative Division Code	Community Name in English	Community Name in Simplified Chinese
110105002024	Tidong	体东
110105002025	Jiqingli	吉庆里
110105002026	Jixiangli	吉祥里
110105002027	Sanfengli	三丰里
110105002028	Yabaoli	雅宝里
110105002029	Tianfuyuan	天福园
110105002030	Fangcaodi	芳草地

== Landmarks ==
Four massive buildings—the Fulllink Tower, Union Plaza, China Life Tower and Prime Tower—sit along the southwestern part of the area. This is matched with a lot of residential high-rises in the northwest.

The northern central area is home to Dongyue Temple at Shenlu Street. The southern central area is full of even newer modern high-rise buildings and office buildings.

The northeastern area is home to a smorgasbord of banks, including a sizeable building belonging to the Industrial and Commercial Bank of China. The southeastern part, meanwhile, is a technology hub, home to the Bainaohui complex, which has numerous PC-related shops. Next to Bainaohui is the well-known Landao Tower.

The Chaowai area overlaps with the Dongdaqiao crossing.

Chaowai is a hub for nightlife activity. Two KTVs, plenty of restaurants, and the decor, make this part of the city appear like night doesn't affect its activity. Meanwhile, the ongoing development continues throughout the night.

The Chaowai region has traffic problems of its own. Traffic on Chaoyangmen Outer Street is often congested, especially at peak times. Both ends of the Chaowai region are served by Beijing Subway.

Chaoyangmen Outer Street runs through the centre of the region.

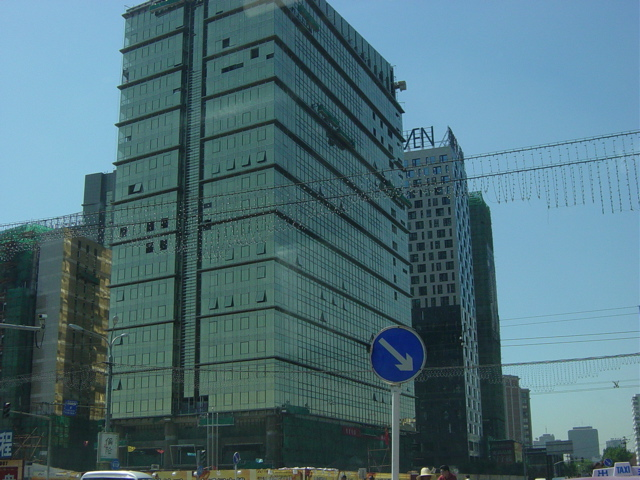
Development in 2004

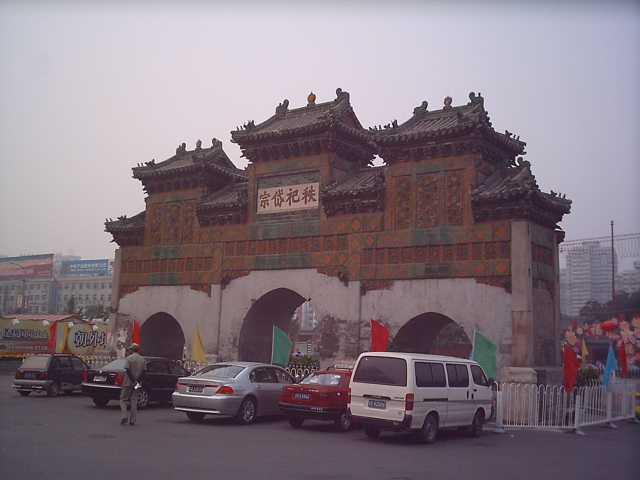
Area around Beijing Dongyue Temple

== See also ==
- List of township-level divisions of Beijing
