= Balizhuang Subdistrict, Chaoyang District, Beijing =

Balizhuang Subdistrict 八里庄街道
- Subdistrict
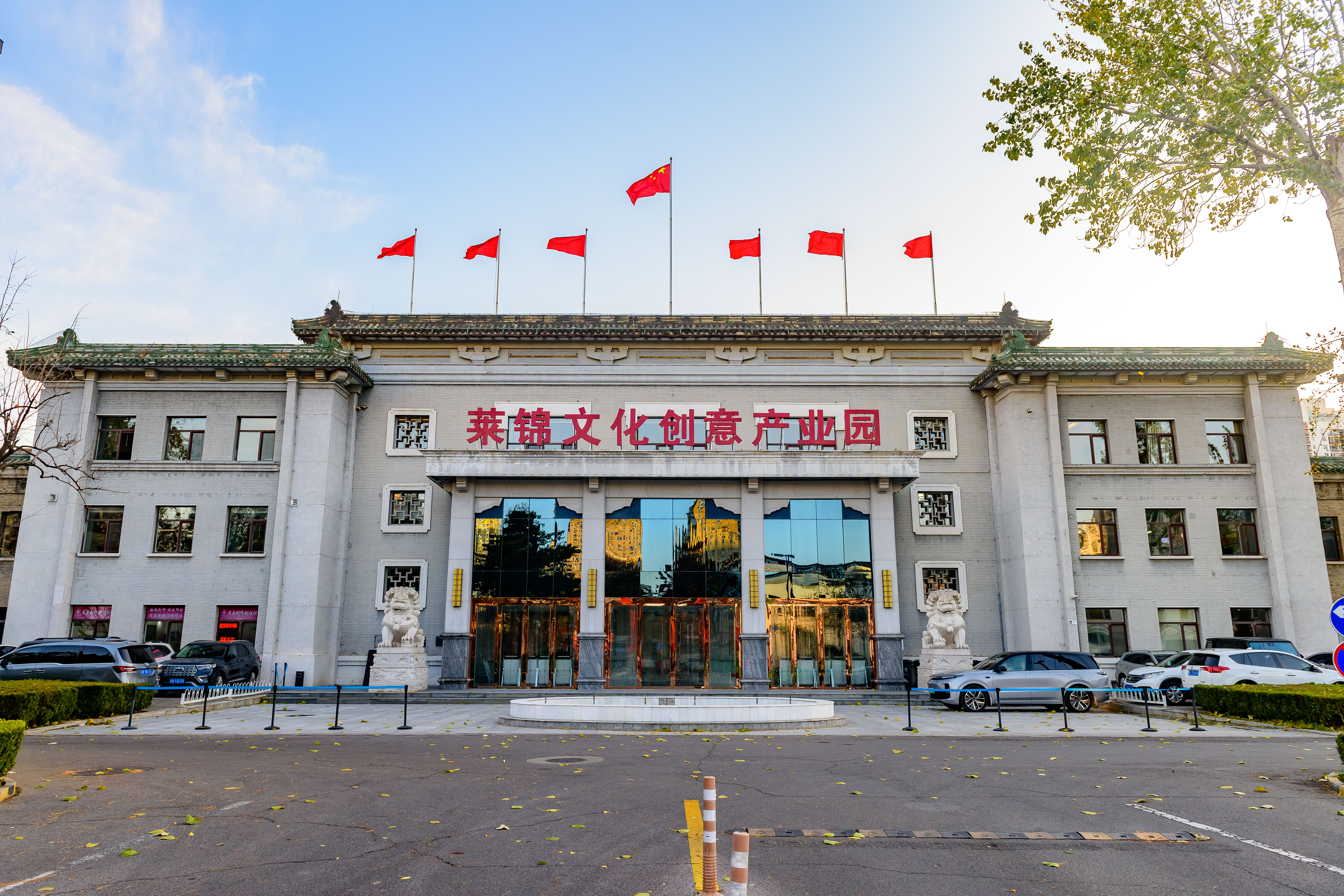
- Former Beijing No. 2 Cotton Textile Factory within the subdistrict, 2024

- Location within Beijing Location within China
- Coordinates: 39°54′50″N 116°28′22″E
- Country: China
- Municipality: Beijing
- District: Chaoyang

Area
  - Total: 4.4 km^{2} (1.7 sq mi)
- Elevation: 45 m (148 ft)

Population (2020)
  - Total: 98,084
  - Density: 22,000/km^{2} (58,000/sq mi)
- Time zone: UTC+8 (China Standard)
- Postal code: 100025
- Area code: 010

Balizhuang Subdistrict (simplified Chinese: 八里庄街道; traditional Chinese: 八里莊街道; pinyin: Bālǐzhuāng Jiēdào) is a subdistrict of Chaoyang District, Beijing, deriving its name from its location 8 Chinese li from Chaoyangmen and located within the 4th Ring Road. It borders Liulitun Subdistrict to the north, Pingfang Township to the east, Gaobeidian Township to the south, Hujialou and Jianwai Subdistricts to the west. As of 2020, it has a total population of 98,084.

== History ==
Timetable of changes in the status of Balizhuang Subdistrict
| Year | Status |
|---|---|
| 1949 | Created as Balizhuang Township, Part of 2nd Suburban District and later the 10th District |
| 1956 | Reorganized into Balizhuang Subdistrict, part of East Suburban District |
| 1959 | Incorporated into Xiaozhuang Subdistrict |
| 1960 | Separated from Xiaozhuang Subdistrict, and made into People's Commune of Balizhuang |
| 1979 | Restored as a subdistrict |

== Administrative Divisions ==
At the end of 2021, there are 16 communities within the subdistrict:

| Administrative Division Code | Community Name in English | Community Name in Simplified Chinese |
|---|---|---|
| 110105015033 | Shilipu | 十里堡 |
| 110105015034 | Ganluyuan | 甘露园 |
| 110105015035 | Balizhuang Dongli | 八里庄东里 |
| 110105015036 | Balizhuang Xili | 八里庄西里 |
| 110105015037 | Hongmiao | 红庙 |
| 110105015038 | Hongmiao Beili | 红庙北里 |
| 110105015039 | Yanjingli | 延静里 |
| 110105015040 | Yuanyang Tiandi | 远洋天地 |
| 110105015041 | Chengshi Huating | 城市华庭 |
| 110105015042 | Chaoyang Wuxian | 朝阳无限 |
| 110105015043 | Luoma Jiayuan | 罗马嘉园 |
| 110105015044 | Huamao Zhongxin | 华贸中心 |
| 110105015045 | Shilipu Nanli | 十里堡南里 |
| 110105015046 | Ganluyuan Zhongli | 甘露园中里 |
| 110105015047 | Shilipu Dongli | 十里堡东里 |
| 110105015048 | Balizhuang Donglibei | 八里庄东里北 |

== See also ==
- List of township-level divisions of Beijing
