= Yabaolu =

Street in Beijing, China

Coordinates: 39°54′50″N 116°26′00″E

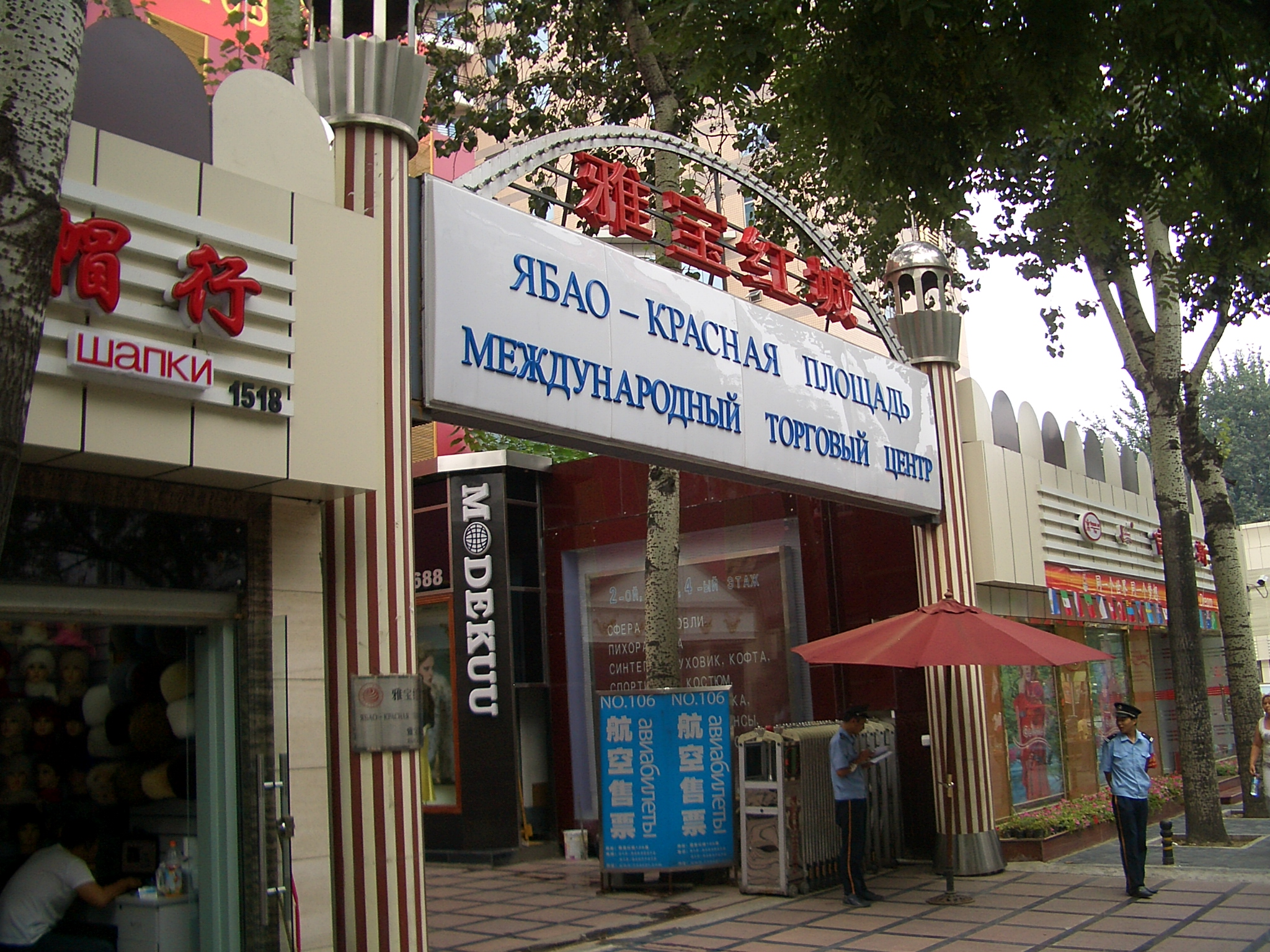
Yabaolu

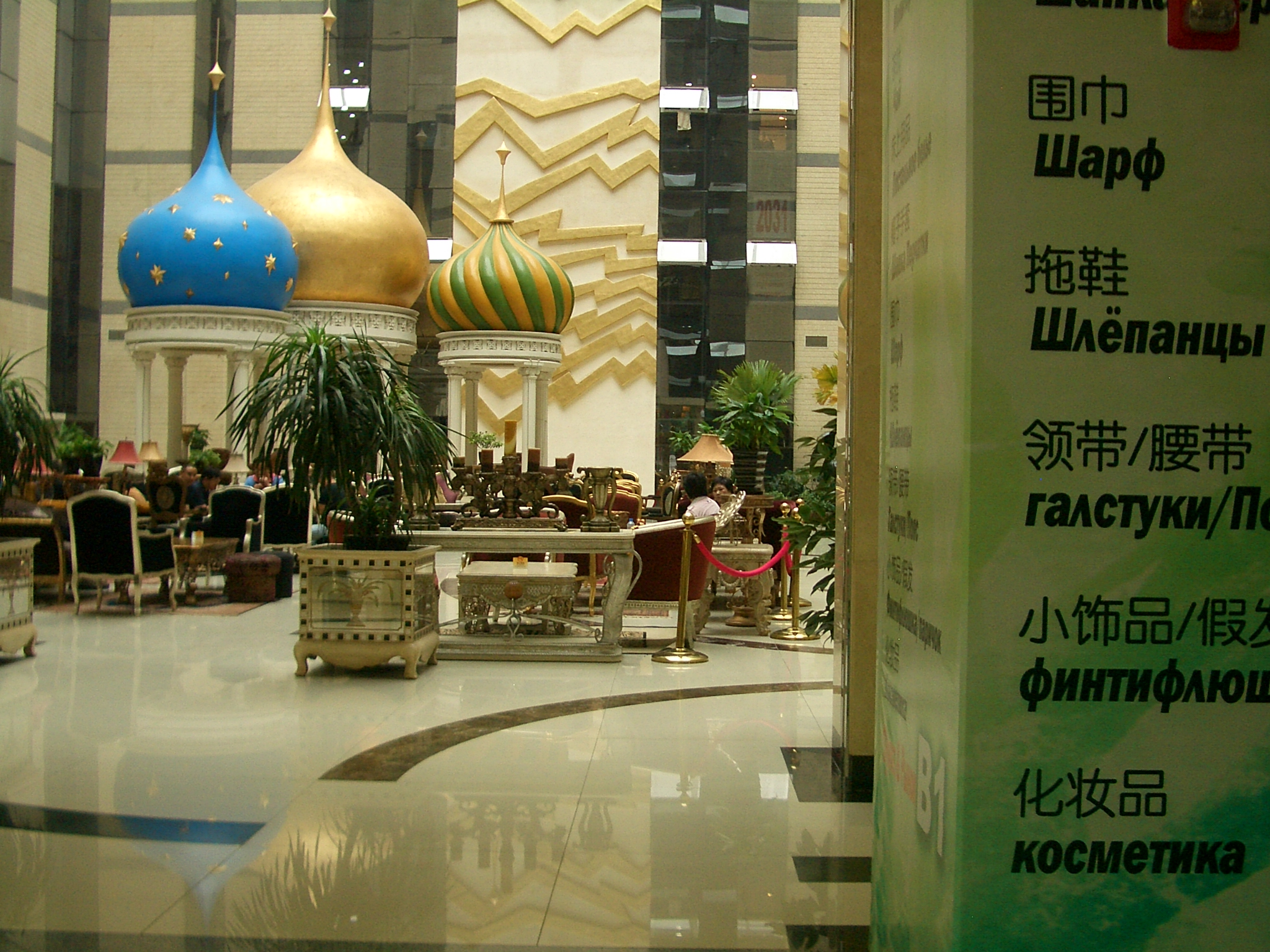
Inside one of Yabao Street shopping malls

Yabaolu (Chinese: 雅宝路; pinyin: Yǎbǎo Lù; lit. 'Yabao Road', Russian: Ябаолу) is a street and area in Beijing, China, running from Chaoyangmen Outer Street to Jianguomen Outer Street. The south part of Yabaolu is home to Beijing Children's Hospital. On the west side of Yabaolu lies Ritan Park.

As of 2011 the community has many high rise shopping malls and shops, is a major hub of trade. Previously it was a community of one story courtyards with little activity.

== Name ==
Yabaolu, "elegant treasure road," is one of the many Old Beijing place names to have been beautified. The original name was "Yaba Hutong" (Chinese: 哑巴胡同; pinyin: Yǎba Hútòng), lit. "mute man alley".

== Yabaolu markets ==
The northern area of Yabaolu is sometimes unofficially named Russiatown, since the clientele of the shops is mostly foreign, with most of that being Russian, and because the neighbourhood has a high population of Russian traders from Siberia, who are transient. Previously local Chinese people called the traders dà dǎoyé (大倒爷, "big trader"), while as of 2011 they now refer to them as hǎo péngyou (好朋友, "good friend"). In addition to Russian traders, Polish, Ukrainian, former Yugoslav, and other eastern European traders also do business in Yabaolu. Jaime FlorCruz of CNN said in 2011 that "Here bargaining is tough but business is good. The most successful, traders say, can resell their items for 20 times their investment."

The China-Russia-related trade in Beijing occurs in Yabaolu. Most of the businesses in Yabaolu cater to Russian customers. Many restaurant owners and shop keepers do business in Yabaolu. Some pedicab drivers speak pidgin Russian and charge the equivalent of two U.S. dollars for a ride. Like many ethnic enclaves, it has its own unique culture imported by its residents. The focal point of the district are several large clothing markets. Business signs are mostly in Russian and written in Cyrillic, a surprise to many tourists. For a former Russian area in Beijing, see Li-Fan Yuan.

FlorCruz said that around 1991 "loaded up scores boxes of goods -- mostly cheap clothes -- onto decrepit trailer trucks bound for train stations" while in 2011 traders "employ shipping companies to move various goods that include silk dresses and shirts, fur jackets, toys and handbags."

After the Beijing Olympics several large modern shopping centres, such as Chaowai-Men, You-Town, have been developed - some to cater more to retail shoppers than wholesale traders.

== References in popular culture ==
Appears and is described in the book Oracle Bones: A Journey Between China's Past and Present by Peter Hessler. Peter has a friend named Polat occupied as a money changer and clothing dealer. They sit on a platform of a Uyghur restaurant drinking beers and watching locals pass by.
