= Hujialou Subdistrict =

Hujialou Subdistrict 呼家楼街道
- Subdistrict
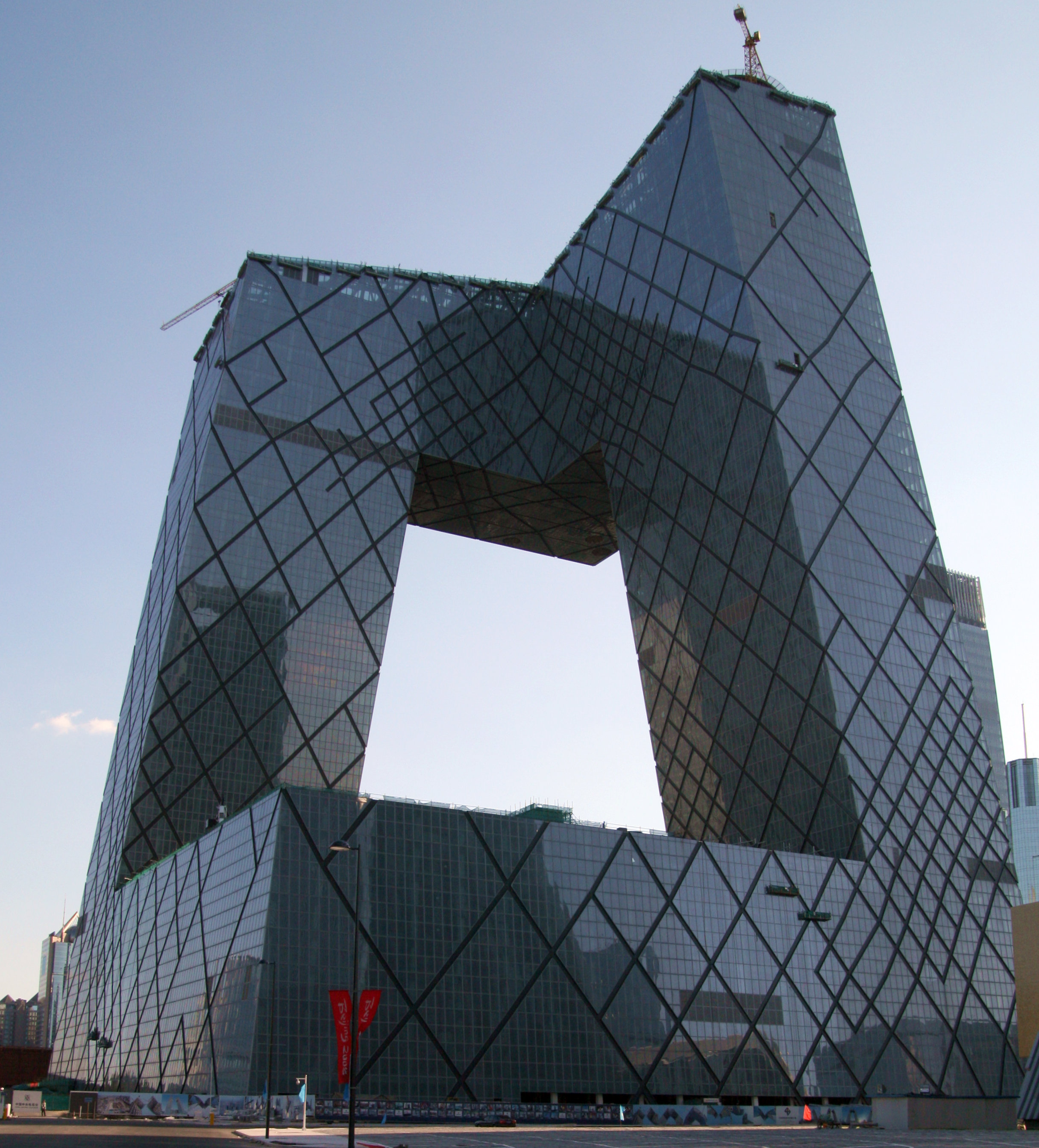
- China Central Television Headquarter within the subdistrict, 2013

- Location within Beijing Location within China
- Coordinates: 39°55′11″N 116°27′29″E
- Country: China
- Municipality: Beijing
- District: Chaoyang

Area
  - Total: 2.8 km^{2} (1.1 sq mi)

Population (2020)
  - Total: 53,018
  - Density: 19,000/km^{2} (49,000/sq mi)
- Time zone: UTC+8 (China Standard)
- Postal code: 100026
- Area code: 010

Hujialou Subdistrict (Chinese: 呼家楼街道; pinyin: Hūjiālóu Jiēdào) is a subdistrict of Chaoyang District, Beijing, China. It is located south of Sanlitun and Tuanjiehu Subdistricts, west of Balizhuang Subdistrict, north of Jianwai Subdistrict, and east of Chaowai Subdistrict. The 2020 population of the subdistrict was 50,318.

== Name ==
This area used to be called Huanggufen (Chinese: 皇姑坟; lit. 'tomb of royal aunt'), as for which royalty was buried here is unknown. Around the end of Qing dynasty, A family with the surname Hu constructed a prominent building that can be seen from afar, and as time went on, Hujialou (Chinese: 呼家楼; lit. 'Building of Hu family') became the name of this area.

== History ==
Timeline of changes in the status of Hujialou
Year	Change
1956	Xiaozhuang Subdistrict was established as part of East Suburban District
1959	Balizhuang Subdistrict was incorporated into Xiaozhuang
1960	Reorganized into a commune. Balizhuang Subdistrict was separated out and made into its own commune
1966	People's Commune of Xiaozhuang changed to People's Commune of Hujialou
1968	People's Commune of Hujialou was changed to Dazhailu Subdistrict
1975	Dazhailu Subdistrict was renamed Hujialou Subdistrict

== Administrative Division ==
As of 2021, there are a total of 11 communities within the subdistrict:

Administrative Division Code	Community Name in English	Community Name in Simplified Chinese
110105003041	Jintaili	金台里
110105003042	Xiaozhuang	小庄
110105003045	Guandongdian	关东店北街
110105003046	Hetaoyuan	核桃园
110105003047	Hujialoubei	呼家楼北
110105003048	Hujialounan	呼家楼南
110105003049	Jintai	金台
110105003050	Dongdaqiao	东大桥
110105003051	Guandongdian	关东店
110105003052	Xinjie	新街
110105003053	Jintong	金桐
