= Zangjing ge =

Chinese Buddhist Architecture

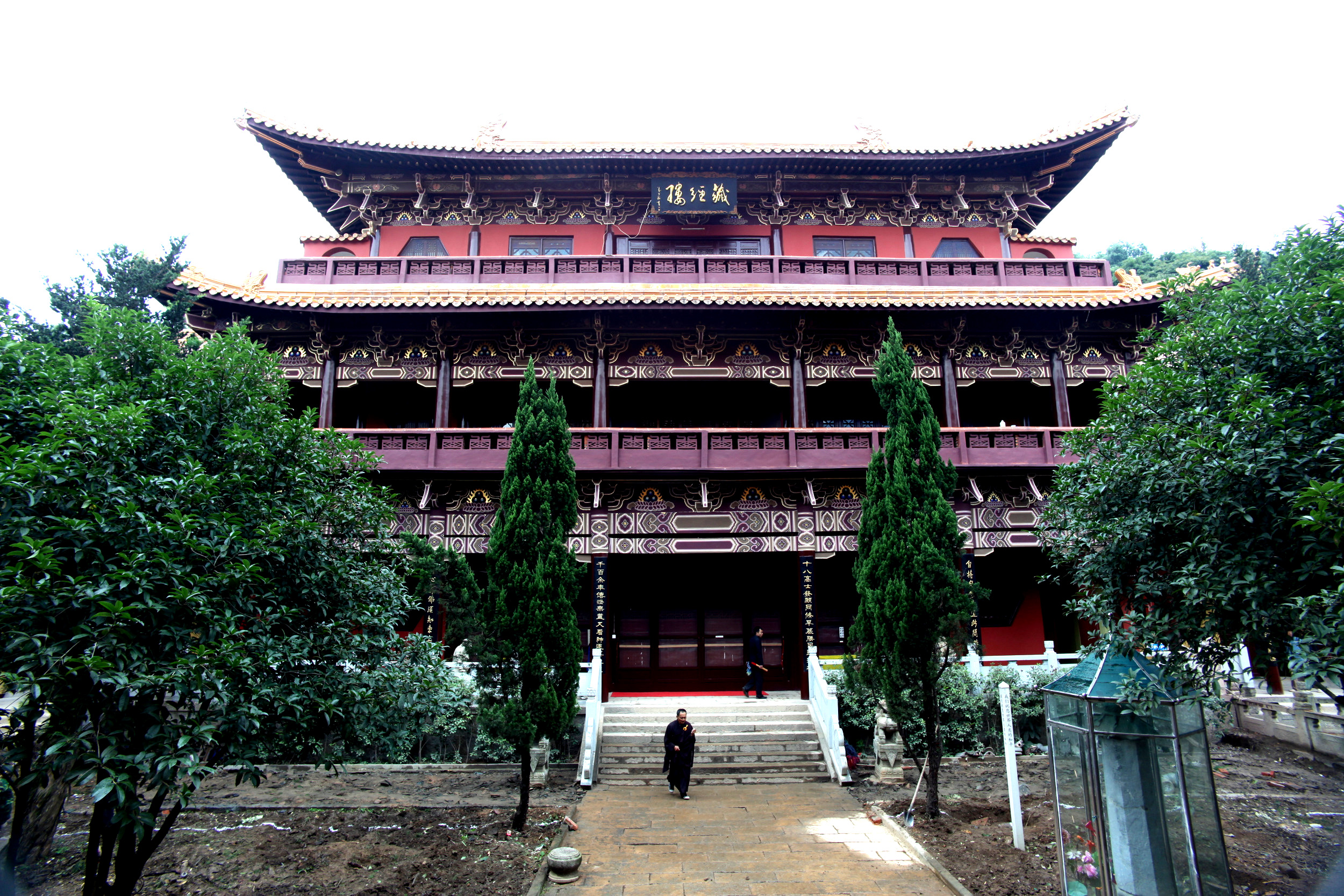
Zangjing ge of Donglin Temple in Jiujiang, Jiangxi, China.

A Zangjing ge (藏經閣, lit: "Repository sutra pavillion") in Chinese Buddhist architecture is a dedicated hall or repository within Buddhist temple complexes repository for sūtras, particularly the Buddhist canons, and sometimes also chronicles of the temple's history. It is also sometimes called a Zangjing lou (藏經樓, lit: "Repository sutra building"). Typically, the Zangjing ge is located at the far end of the central axis of the entire temple, at the highest point of the terrain. It often has two floors, with the top floor for storing scripture and the bottom floor being another hall called the Wanfo dian (千佛閣, lit: "Thousand Buddha Pavilion") which enshrines statues of the Buddhas.

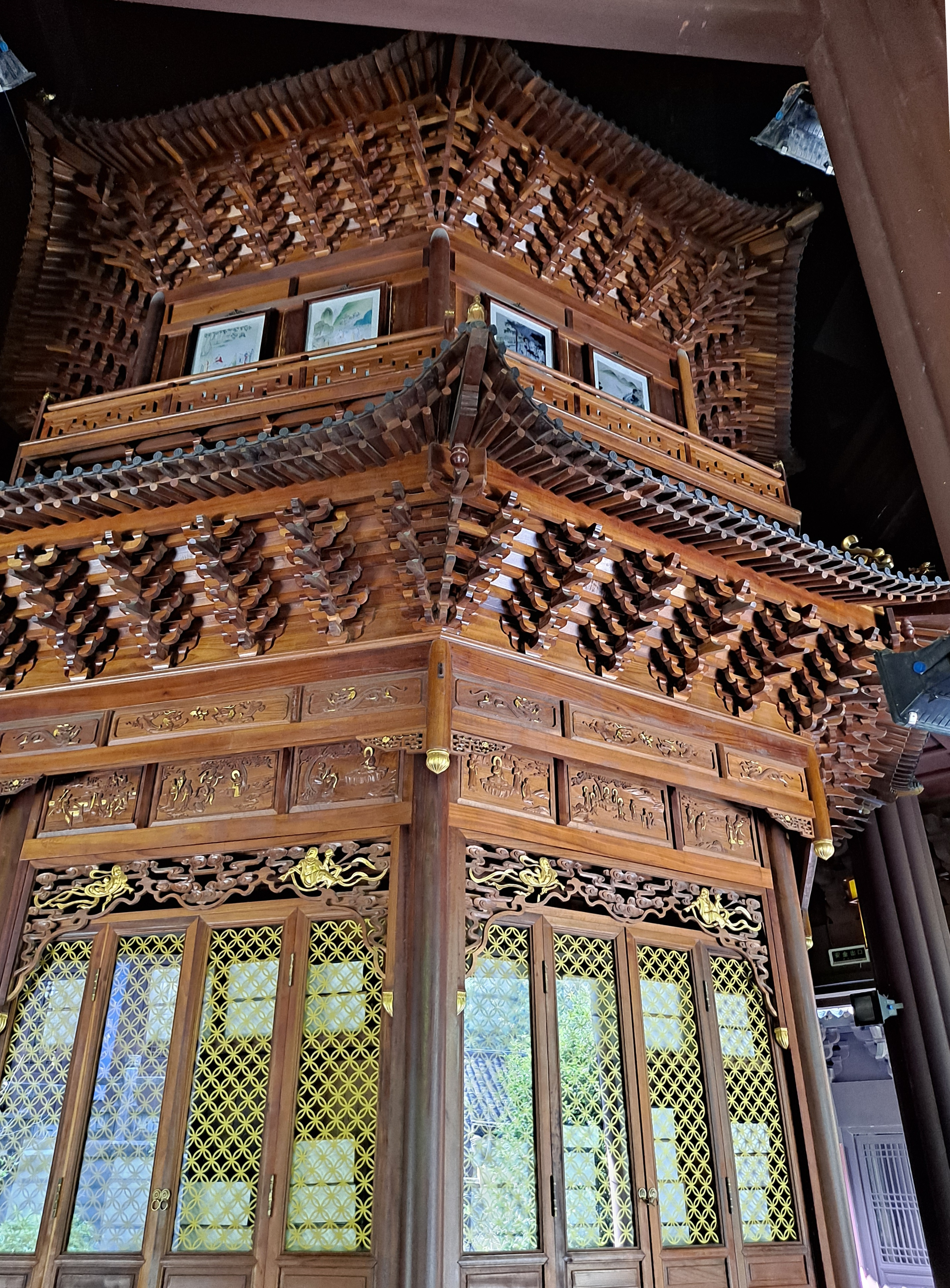
The zhuanlunzang at Gaoli Temple in Hangzhou, Zhejiang, China.

All Zangjing ge buildings are equipped with shelves and other storage equipment to store sūtras. Certain temples have a special octagonal revolving bookshelf for sūtra storage called a zhuanlunzang (轉輪藏, lit: "Rotating Wheel Repository"). It typically consists of a central pillar which revolves and acts like a vertical central axle, with octahedral tubes attaching to it, which allows the entire repository to rotate. Historical accounts indicate that zhuanlunzang were first invented by the eminent Buddhist layman Fu Dashi who lived during the Liang dynasty (502-557). According to the Song dynasty (960-1279) historiographical work Shimen zhengtong (釋門正統, "Orthodox Chronicle of the Śākya Gate"), Fu was motivated to create the zhuanlunzang in order to help both illiterate people and literate people who were too busy to read sūtras in their daily lives. According to this account, the zhuanlunzang that Fu invented could allow a person who rotated it to gain the same merits as a person who read the sūtras. By the Tang Dynasty (618-907), the structure of the zhuanlunzang had become increasingly elaborate, with additional shrines, painted decorations, and hanging mirrors placed on top, and a base surrounding the zhuanlunzang. The zhuanlunzang continued to remain a common element of Zangjing ge in Chinese temples, being recorded in works such as the Song dynasty architectural treatise, the Yingzao Fashi, by Li Jie. The earliest example of a zhuanlunzang in China is one located in the Zangjing ge of Longxing Temple in Hebei, which dates to the Song dynasty. To accommodate this zhuanlunzang, the Zangjing ge of this temple was built featuring some unique structural techniques, including columns that were shifted from their usual locations as well as curved beams. Another notable example is one located in the Zangjing ge of Zhihua Temple in Beijing, which is the only known existing example of a zhuanlunzang from the Ming dynasty (1358-1644).

== Gallery ==
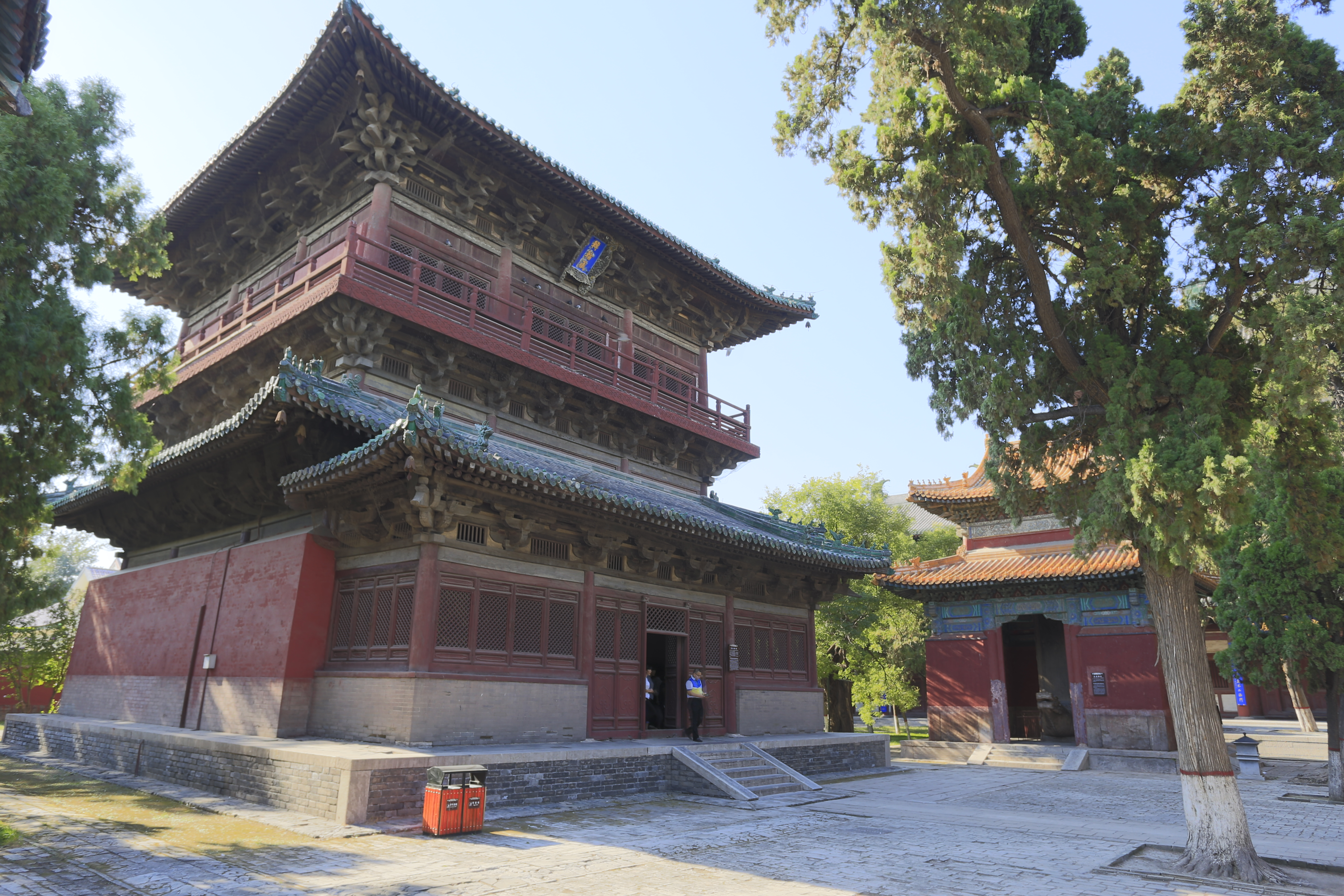
The Zangjing ge at Longxing Temple, 10th century

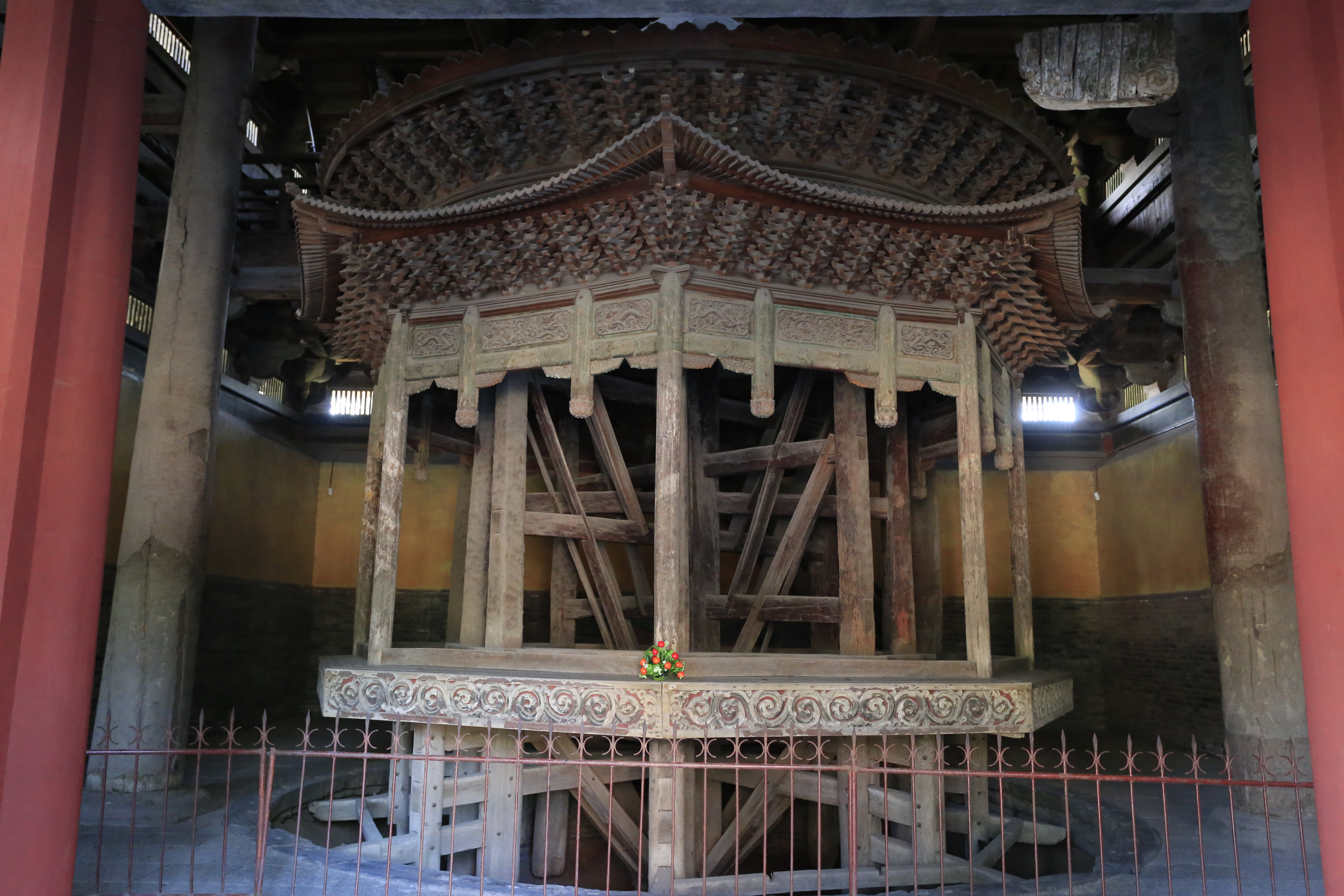
The zhuanlunzang at Longxing Temple, 10th century

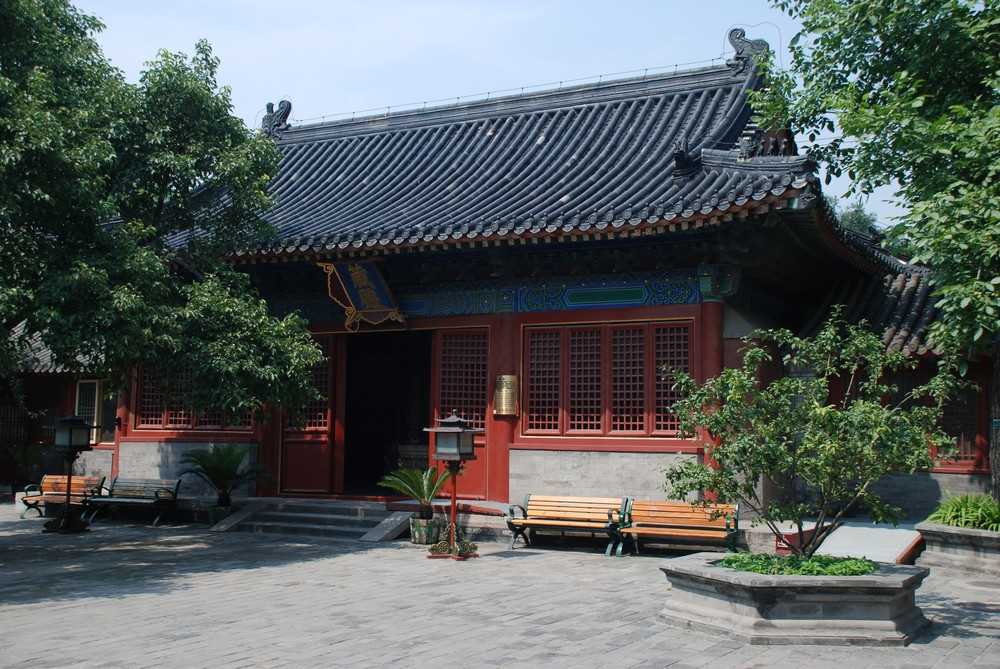
The Zangjing ge at Zhihua Temple

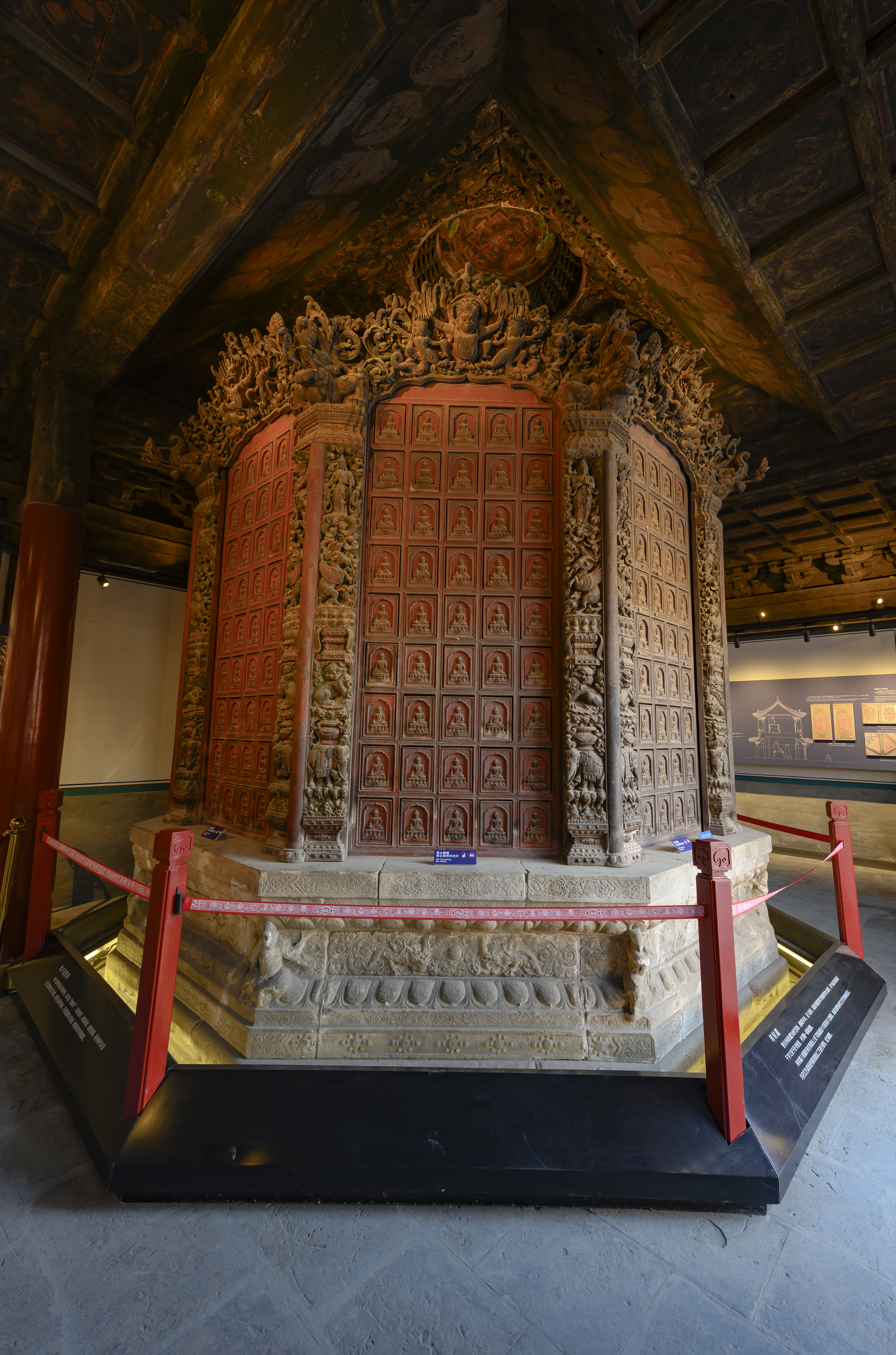
The zhuanlunzang at Zhihua Temple
