= Liulitun Subdistrict =

Liulitun Subdistrict 六里屯街道
- Subdistrict
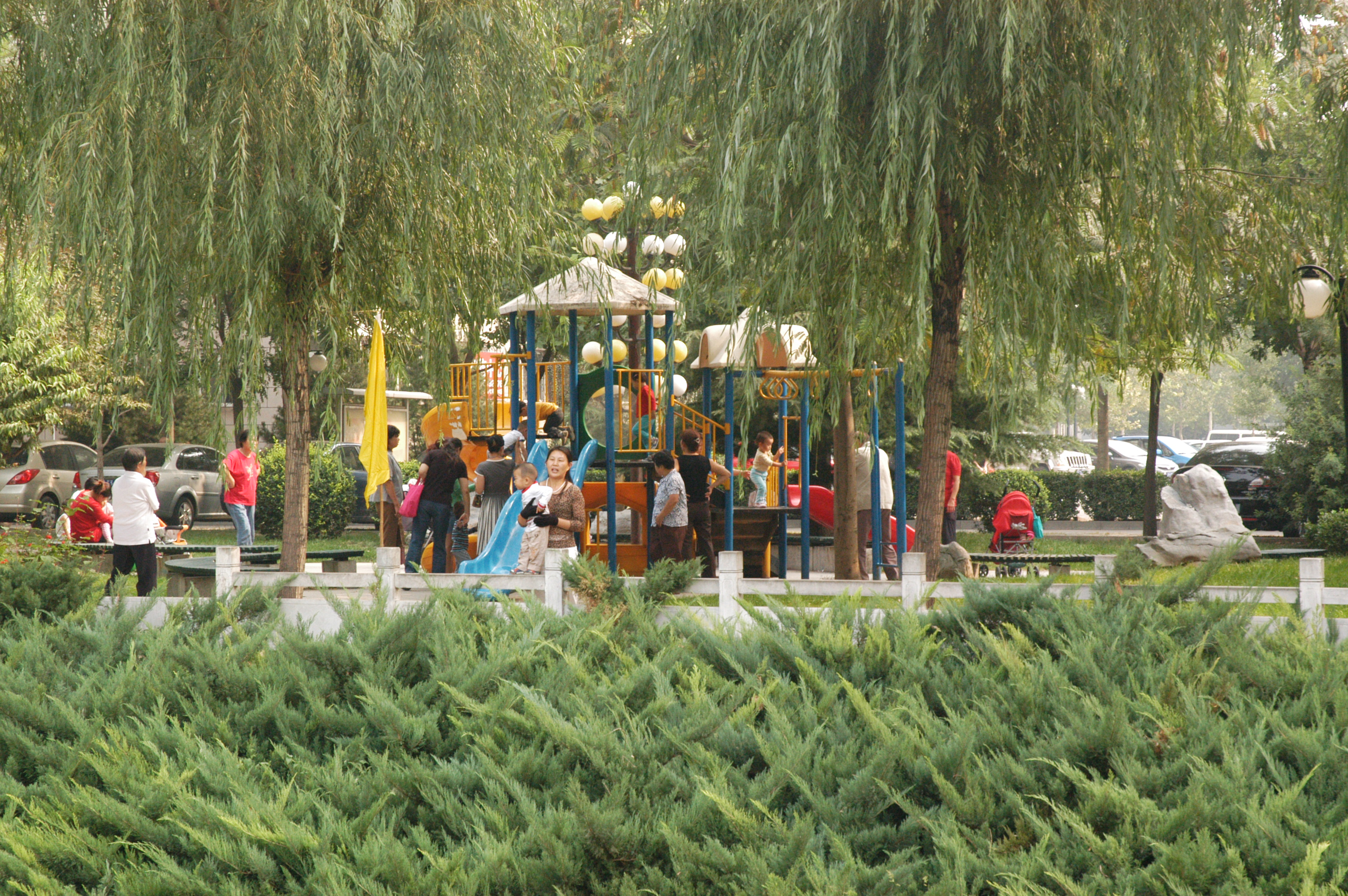
- Honglingjin Park within the subdistrict, 2009

- Location within Beijing Location within China
- Coordinates: 39°55′37″N 116°28′25″E
- Country: China
- Municipality: Beijing
- District: Chaoyang

Area
  - Total: 4.4 km^{2} (1.7 sq mi)

Population (2020)
  - Total: 75,229
  - Density: 17,000/km^{2} (44,000/sq mi)
- Time zone: UTC+8 (China Standard)
- Postal code: 100026
- Area code: 010

Liulitun Subdistrict (Chinese: 六里屯街道; pinyin: Liùlǐtún Jiēdào) is a subdistrict within Chaoyang District, Beijing, China. As of 2020, it has a total population of 75,226.

The subdistrict got its name from Liulitun (Chinese: 六里屯; lit. 'Six Li Village'), which was named so because during Qing dynasty, the village was six Li (3 km) away from Dongzhimen, a former city gate of Beijing city wall.

== History ==
The subdistrict was founded in 1987. In 1993, area east of Honglingjin Park was incorporated into Liulitun Subdistrict.

== Administrative Division ==
In 2021, Liulitun Subdistrict has 12 communities under it:

Administrative Division Code	Community Name in English	Community Name in Simplified Chinese
110105014053	Shilipu Beili	十里堡北里
110105014054	Balizhuang Beili	八里庄北里
110105014055	Balizhuang Nanli	八里庄南里
110105014056	Chenguang	晨光
110105014058	Daojiayuan	道家园
110105014059	Bishuiyuan	碧水园
110105014060	Tianshuiyuan	甜水园
110105014061	Xiushuiyuan	秀水园
110105014062	Liulitun Beili	六里屯北里
110105014063	Xuante Jiayuan	炫特家园
110105014064	Tianshuixiyuan	甜水西园
110105014065	Balizhuang Belidong	八里庄北里东
