= Chaoyangmen Subdistrict =

Chaoyangmen Subdistrict 朝阳门街道
- Subdistrict
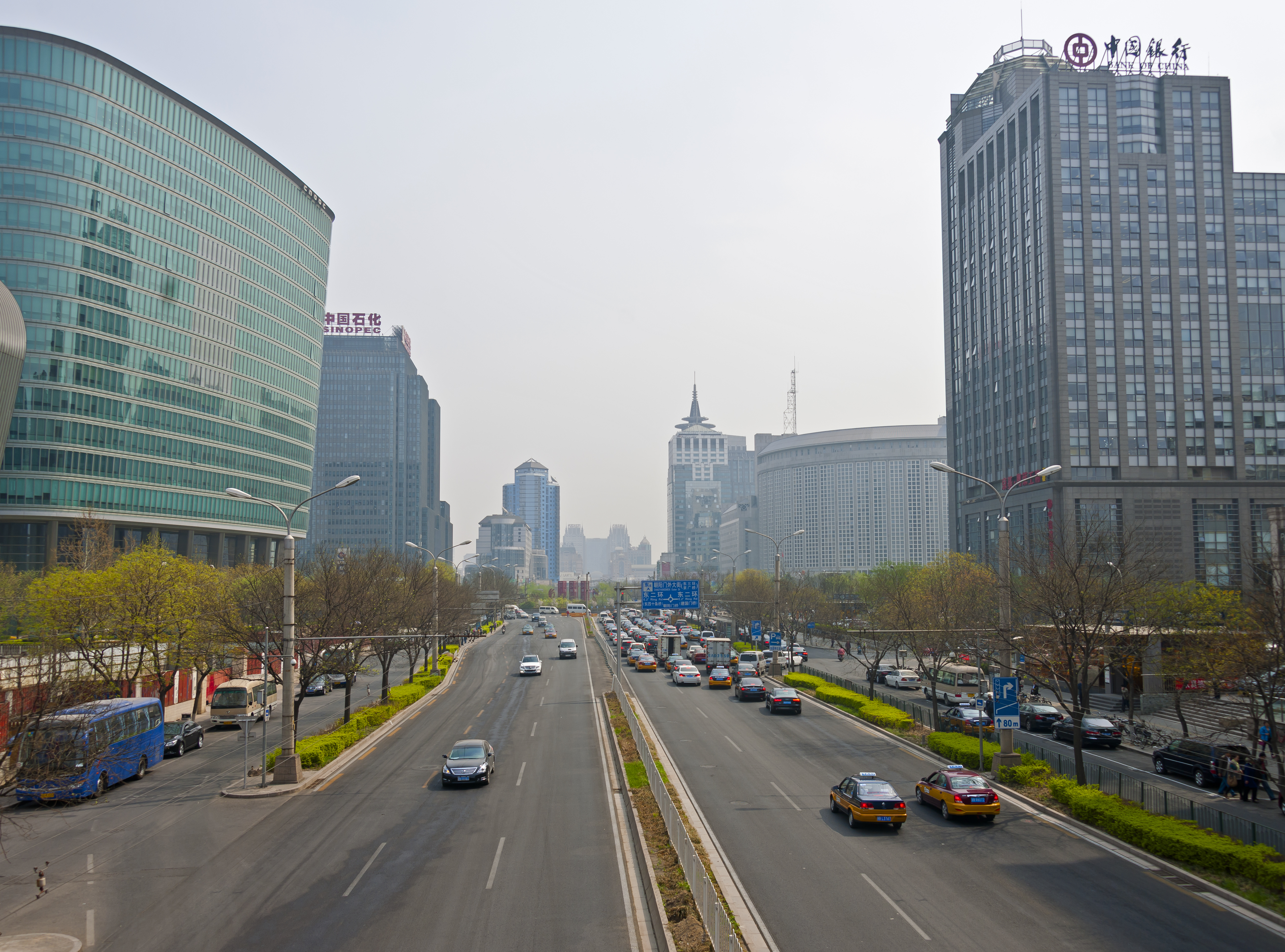
- A main road in Chaoyaomen Subdistrict

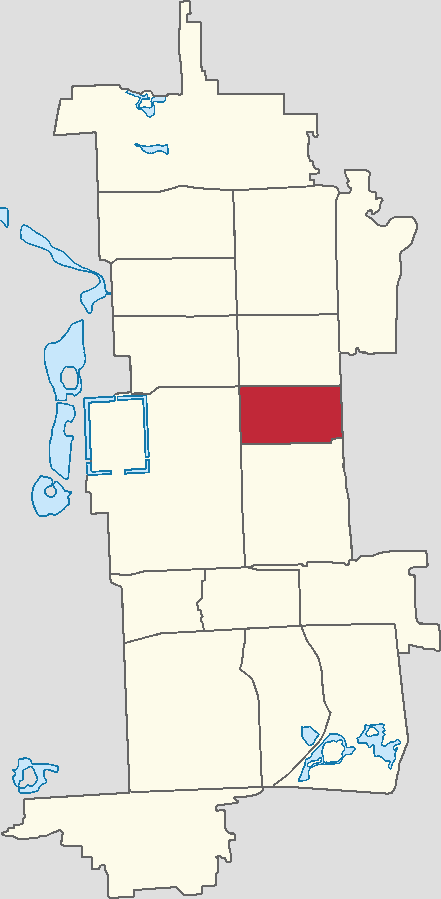
- Location of Chaoyangmen Subdistrict within Dongcheng District

- Location within Beijing Location within China
- Coordinates: 39.9192°N 116.3960°E
- Country: China
- Municipality: Beijing
- District: Dongcheng
- Village-level Division: 9 communities

Area
  - Total: 1.31 km^{2} (0.51 sq mi)

Population (2020)
  - Total: 30,473
  - Density: 23,300/km^{2} (60,200/sq mi)
- Time zone: UTC+8 (China Standard)
- Postal code: 100005
- Area code: 010

Chaoyangmen Subdistrict (Chinese: 朝阳门街道; pinyin: cháoyángmén jiēdào) is a subdistrict in eastern portion of Dongcheng District, Beijing, China. It consists of 9 communities. As of 2020, this subdistrict has a population of 30,473.

The subdistrict was named after Chaoyangmen (Chinese: 朝阳门; lit. 'Gate that faces the east'), a gate part of Beijing's city wall that once stood in the region.

== History ==
Timeline of changes in the status of Chaoyangmen Subdistrict
Year	Status
1912	Part of 1st Inner District
1949	Part of Dongcheng District. Following subdistricts were organized: Chaonei Dajie; Caijia Dayuan; Lishi Hutong; Qianchaomian Hutong; Shijia Hutong
1955	After redistricting there are three subdistricts left: Qianchaomian, Zhuganxiang and Dafangjia.
1958	The three subdistricts merged into Chaoyangmen Subdistrict
1960	Transformed into a commune
1990	Changed back to a subdistrict.

== Administrative Division ==
As of 2021, Chaoyangmen Subdistrict was divided into 9 communities, they are as follows:

Administrative Division Code	Community Name in English	Community Name in Simplified Chinese
110101007001	Shijia	史家
110101007002	Neiwu	内务
110101007003	Yanyue	演乐
110101007005	Lishi	礼士
110101007006	Chaonei Toutiao	朝内头条
110101007007	Chaoxi	朝西
110101007009	Zhugan	竹杆
110101007011	Dafangjia	大方家
110101007013	Xinxian	新鲜

== Famous Sites ==
- Chaoyangmen
- Dongsi Mosque

== See also ==
- List of township-level divisions of Beijing
