= Beijing Dongyue Temple =

Taoist temple in Chaoyang District, Beijing, China

- Temple of the Eastern Peak in Beijing
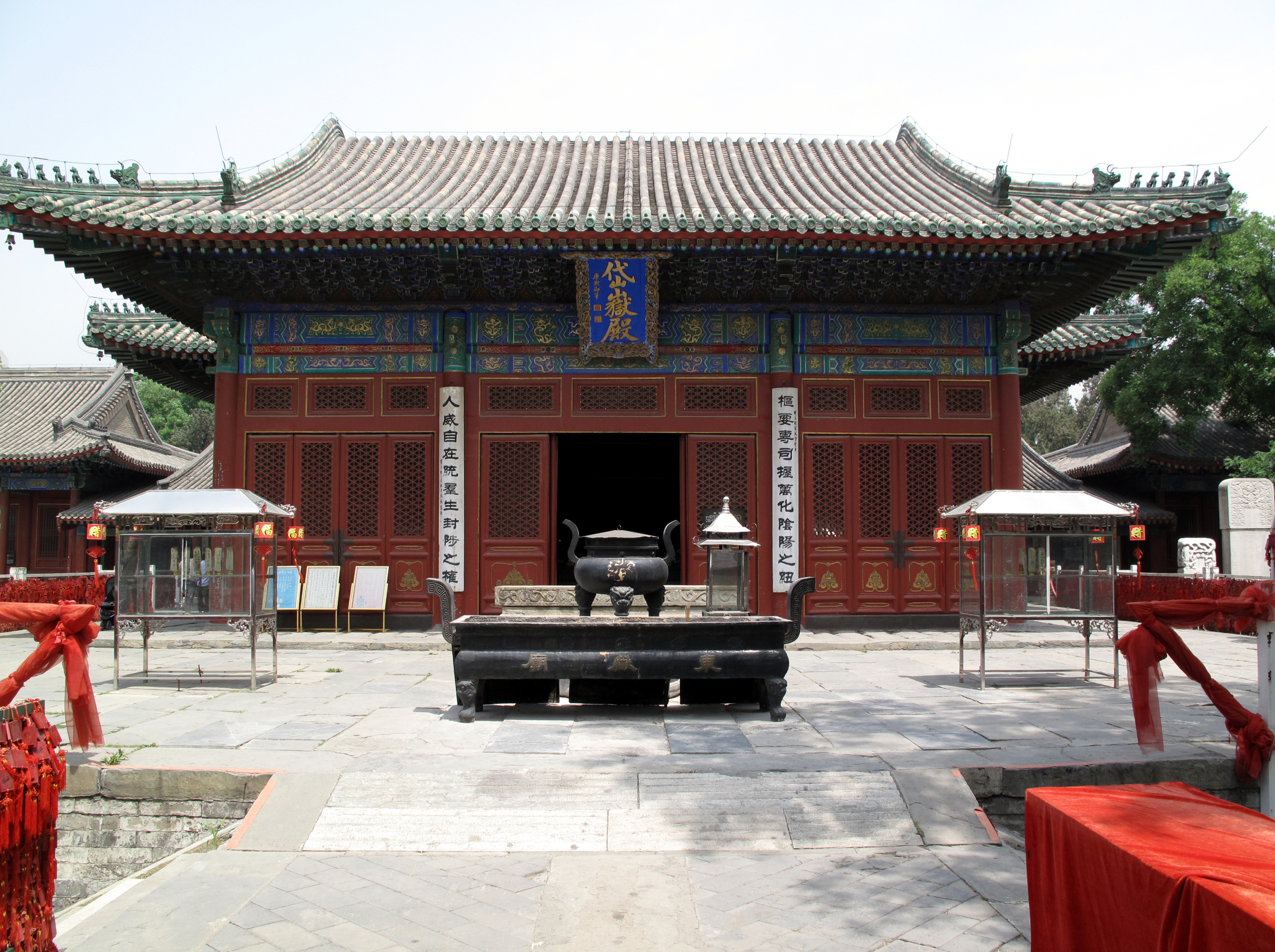
- Main shrine

Religion
- Affiliation: Taoism

Location
- Location: Beijing
- Country: China
- Interactive map of Beijing Dongyue Temple
- Coordinates: 39°55′25″N 116°26′16″E

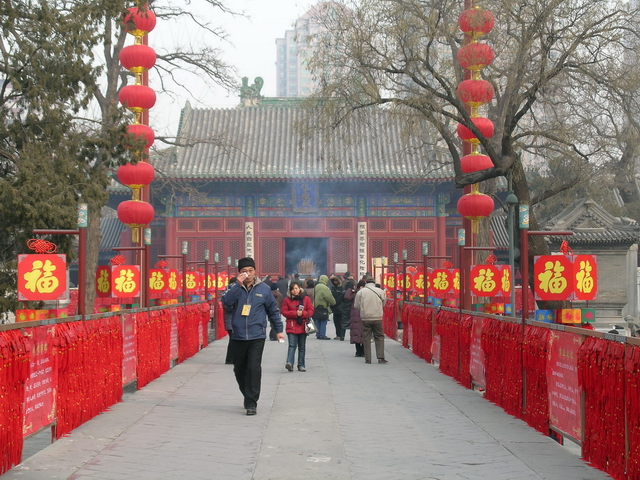
Main axis of the courtyard.

The Temple of the Eastern Peak in Beijing (simplified Chinese: 北京东岳庙; traditional Chinese: 北京東嶽廟; pinyin: Běijīng Dōngyuè Miào) is a Taoist temple in the Chaowai area, Chaoyang District, Beijing, China. The temple is dedicated to the Great Deity of the Eastern Peak (simplified Chinese: 东岳大帝; traditional Chinese: 東嶽大帝; pinyin: Dōngyuèdàdì). "Eastern Peak" is the cosmological name of Mount Tai, the easternmost and holiest of the Five Sacred Mountains of China. Founded during the Yuan dynasty, the Eastern Peak Temple is the largest temple of Zhengyi Taoism in Beijing and protected as a national cultural spot. The temple also hosts the Beijing Folk Customs Museum.

== History ==
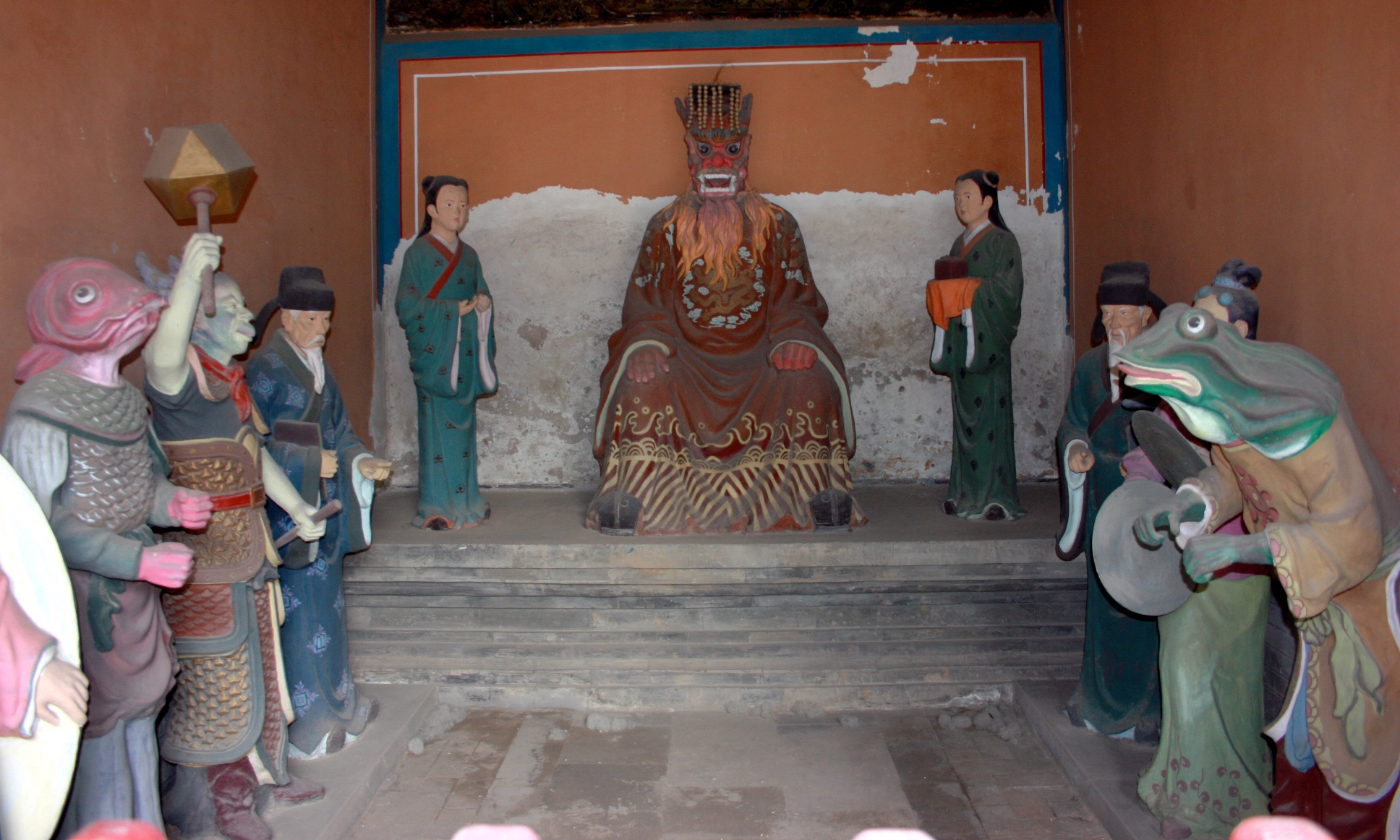
Statues representing the "Department of Rain Gods".

The Eastern Peak Temple was founded in 1319. Zhang Liusun (1248–1321), a Yuan dynasty official and descendant of the Daoist Zhang Daoling, raised money and acquired the land for the temple, but died shortly afterwards. His disciple, the Daoist master Wu Quanjie (1269–1346) continued the construction. In 1322, the main halls and the main gate were completed. The temple was repaired and given its present name in 1447 during the reign of the Zhengtong Emperor in the Ming dynasty. During the Qing dynasty, the temple was rebuilt twice, in 1698 during the reign of the Kangxi Emperor and again in 1761 during the reign of the Qianlong Emperor. The temple also underwent expansion during the Qing dynasty.

During the chaos that ensued during the Cultural Revolution, the temple was severely damaged – the insides were entirely gutted and the contents taken away and/or destroyed. The temples reopened in late 1970s. As the original statues had disappeared, all but five of the statues are replicas; the Eastern Peak Temple was given five statues from the Beijing Sanguanmiao (Three Officials Temple), which no longer serves as a temple. Three courtyards and buildings remaining occupy only part of the original site. The rest was taken for use by the Public Security Bureau until the 1990s, and was redeveloped into commercial real estate in the early 2000s after the PSB vacated. It served as a school, government offices, and housing for hundreds of people until 1996, when it was declared a national treasure (State Council resolution number 4-113 of November 20, 1996). The temple was restored in 2002 at a total cost of 5.8 million yuan.

== Layout ==
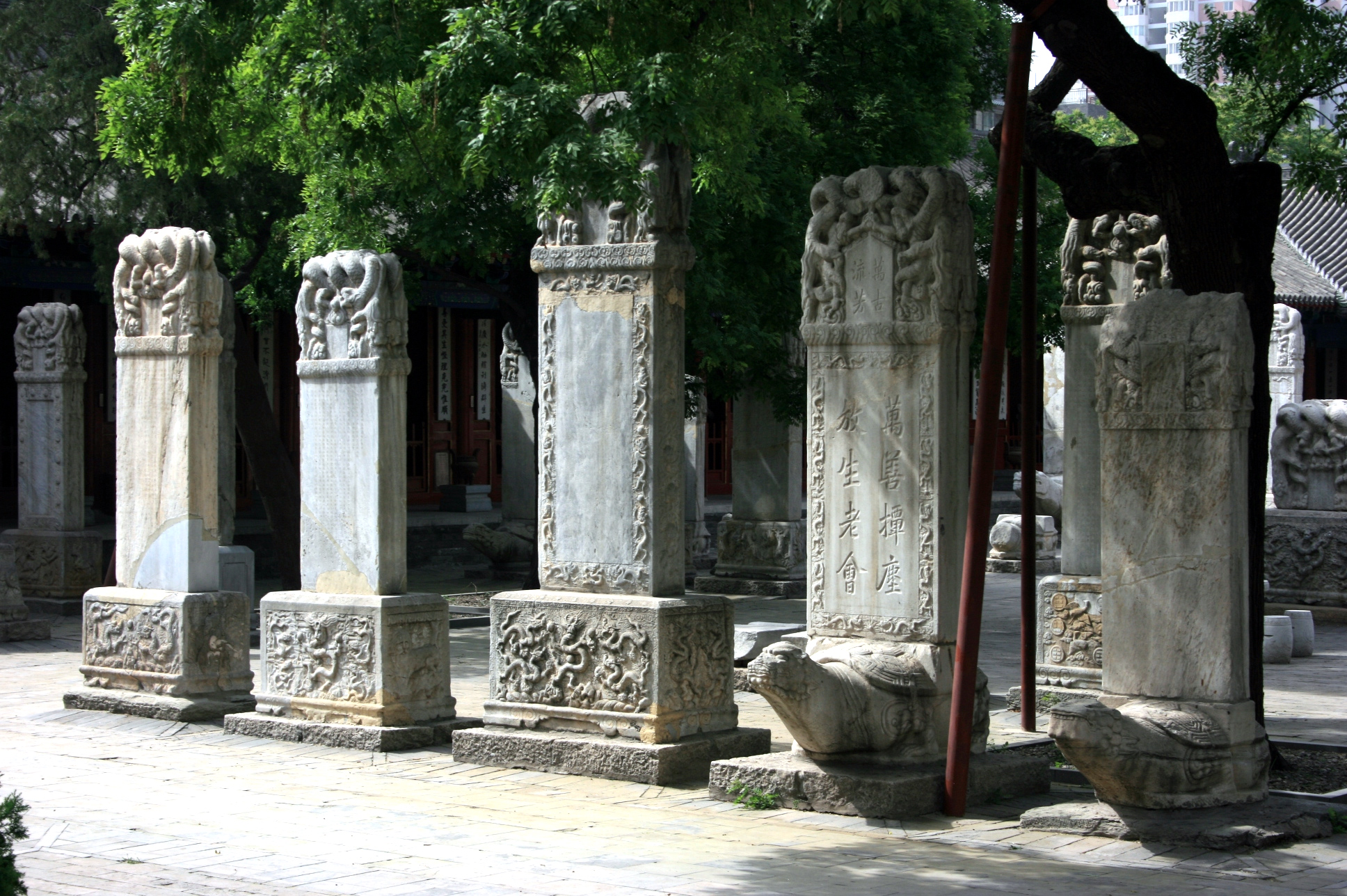
Stone tablets in the courtyard.

The temple is organized around three main courtyards, it has 376 rooms and covers 4.7 hectares. The courtyards hold a collection of stone tablets. About 140 stone tablets dating from the Yuan, Ming, and Qing dynasties as well as from the early republican era of China are thought to have once stood in the temple, 90 tablets remain today. Among the remaining tablets is a Yuan dynasty tablet with calligraphy by Zhao Mengfu. This tablet is the only remaining piece in a set of four, its inscription give an account of the life of the temple founder Zhang Liusun and consists of 2786 characters in total.

The three main halls of the temple are Yude Hall, Daizongbao Hall, and Yuhuang Hall. Yude Hall displays statues made from Jinsi Nanmu wood, among them statues of the gods of heaven, earth, and water. The temple once contained more than 3000 steles in total of which about 1000 have been preserved. Surrounding the central courtyard is a succession of small rooms that open to the courtyard and each display an ensemble of plaster statues depicting one of the "seventy-six wings" of the Taoist pantheon.

An archway with three gates and a cover of green and yellow glazed tiles that also belongs to the temple complex has been separated by the public road.

== Location ==
The address of the temple is Dongyue Miao, 141 Chaowai Dajie, Chaoyang District, Beijing (东岳庙朝阳门外大街141号). It is located about 500 meters east of the Chaoyangmen subway station.

== See also ==
- Other Dongyue temples
