= Chaoyangmen Outer Street =

Road in Beijing, China

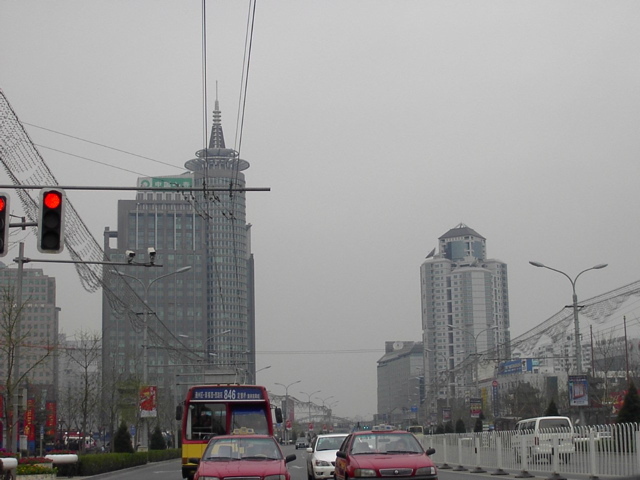
- Chaoyangmen Outer Street in 2003. To the left the China Life Tower and right the Guangyao Apartment Tower.
- Interactive map of Chaoyangmen Outer Street
- Location: Beijing, China

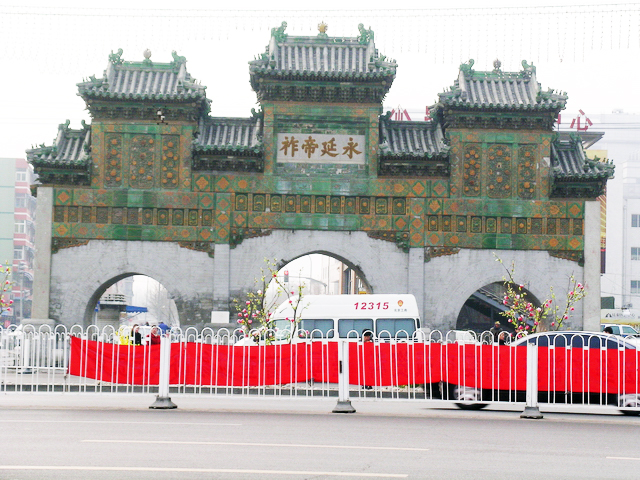
One of Beijing's few remaining archways, on Chaoyangmen Outer Street and Shenlu Street.

Chaoyangmen Outer Street (simplified Chinese: 朝阳门外大街; traditional Chinese: 朝陽門外大街; pinyin: Cháoyángmén Wài Dàjiē) is a major through route in Beijing, China, and runs through the Chaowai area near Chaoyangmen. Geographically, it is in the eastern urban area, and is still considered very close to the city centre even though it lies outside the 2nd Ring Road. It is north of a similarly significant area, the Beijing CBD.

Chaoyangmen Outer Street runs from Chaoyangmen Bridge through to the massive Dongdaqiao crossing. In its path lie office blocks, shopping areas, and technology stores (including Bainaohui), making it one of the busiest streets in Beijing. Traffic is often congested, especially near the nodal points Chaoyangmen and Dongdaqiao.

== History ==
=== 13th–19th century ===
Chaoyangmen was originally called "Qihuamen". Chaoyangmen Outer Street is the road to the Qiyangmen Gate during the Yuan dynasty, the Chaoyangmen Guanxiang area during the Ming and Qing dynasties and the Republic of China. During the Qing dynasty the road was paved.

Over the years, many temples were built along Chaoyangmen Outer Street, among them the Tianxian Temple (built during the Ming dynasty, destroyed), Jiutian Puhua Palace (built 1647 during the Qing dynasty), Dongyue Temple (built in the Yuan dynasty), and Cizun Temple (destroyed). Dongyue Temple is located in the central section of Chaoyangmen Out Street.

=== 20th–21st century ===
In 1942 the road was repaved. After the founding of the People's Republic of China, the asphalt pavement was widened and refurbished in 1953. In 1988, a large-scale expansion and reconstruction was carried out. In 1990 the street was extended eastward to the East Third Ring Road and was connected to Chaoyang Road.

In the 1950s, the east and west arches on Chaoyangmen Outer Street were demolished. Since the 1950s, Dongyue Temple was occupied by a unit of the Beijing Municipal Public Security Bureau. In 1988, the gates facing Chaoyangmen Outer Street were dismantled, thus making the bell tower, the drum tower and the two doors directly face each other. After renovation in 1998, it was opened as a Beijing Folk Museum. In 2008, Dongyue Temple was restored as a place of religious activity. Since then, it has the dual functions of museum and Taoist temple.

Office buildings and retail along Chaoyangmen Outer Street received a major boost in 1996 when China opened its Ministry of Foreign Affairs on this arterial. Other high rises that were built along Chaoyangmen Outer Street include: China Life Tower, Chaoyangmenwai Soho, Guangyao Apartment Tower, Guoan Mansion, Jingguang Center, and the World Financial Center. Beijing's CBD is developing to the south of Chaoyangmen Outer Street.

== Attractions ==
- The famous Beijing Dongyue Temple (built and developed 1319 and onwards) is located along Chaoyangmen Outer Street. It is a national cultural spot of China and hosts the Beijing Folk Customs Museum.
- Pfidang or Memorial archway, a glazed tile archway opposite Dongyue Temple's Sun Gate, on the south side of Chaoyangmen Outer Street and at the entrance of Shenlu Street.
