= Chaoyangmen =

Location in Dongcheng District, Beijing

Coordinates: 39.9238°N 116.4336°E

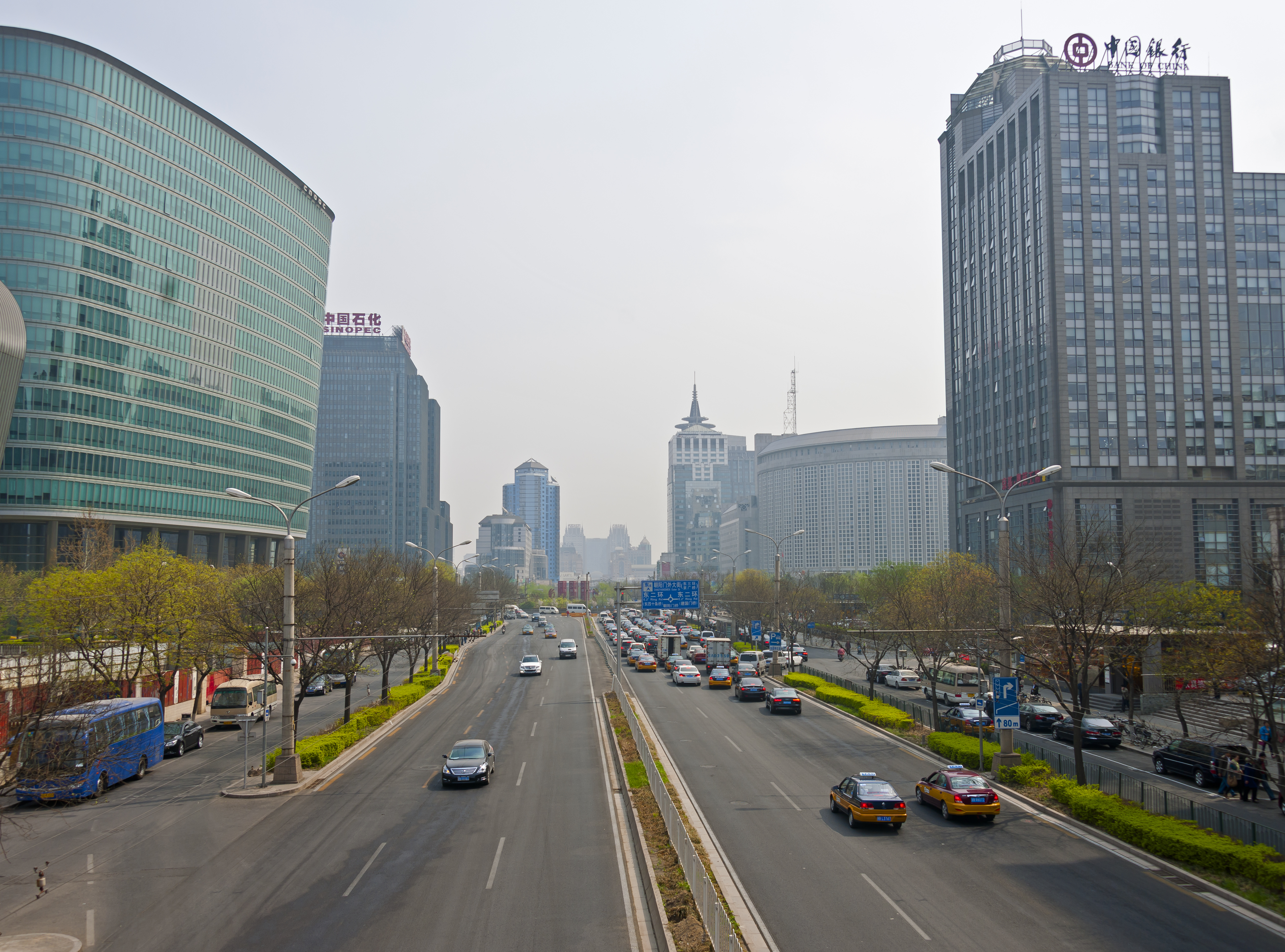
Chaoyangmen from the west

Chaoyangmen (traditional Chinese: 朝陽門; simplified Chinese: 朝阳门; pinyin: Cháoyángmén; Manchu: ᡧᡠᠨ
ᠪᡝ
ᠠᠯᡳᡥᠠ
ᡩᡠᡴᠠ; Möllendorff: šun be aliha duka) was a gate in the former city wall of Beijing. It is now a transportation node and a district border in Beijing. It is located on the border of Chaoyang District and Dongcheng District, Beijing. Running from north to south is the eastern 2nd Ring Road. The Beijing Subway (Line 2 and Line 6) has a station at Chaoyangmen.

== History ==
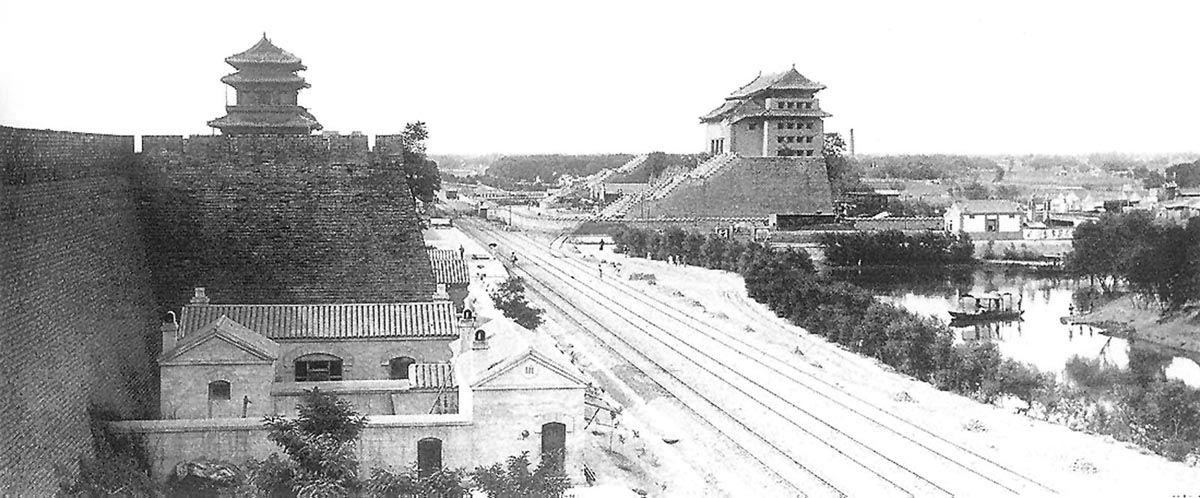
Chaoyangmen in 1905

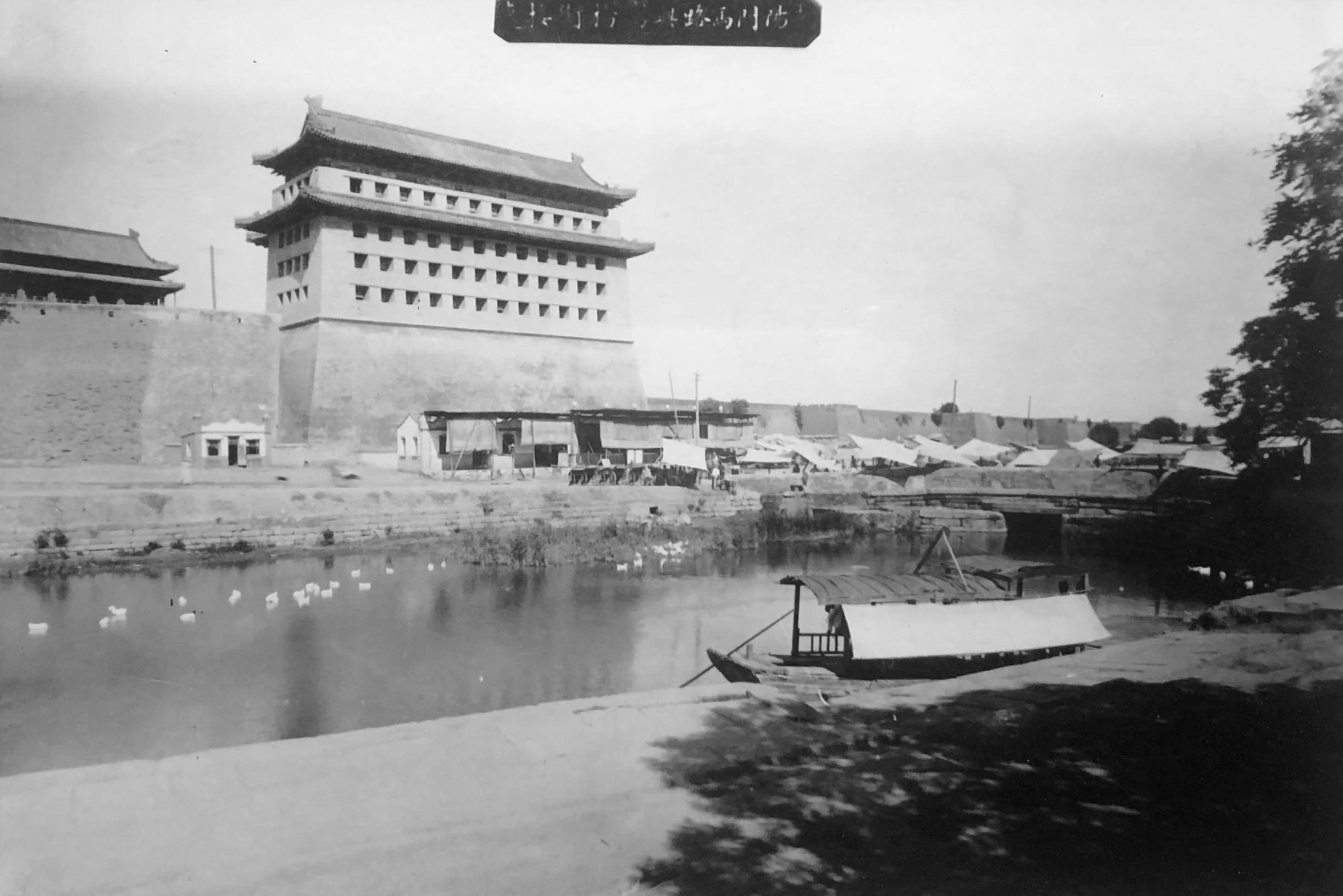
Chaoyangmen and hanging bridge in 1917

The Chaoyang Gate (the Gate Facing the Sun) was the main gate of the East City. The gate was demolished, along with the walls and moat of the East City in the 1950s and replaced with the 2nd Ring Road (Beijing) where the moat and walls had been, and an elevated roundabout-bridge where the gate had been.

== Chaoyangmen today ==
West of Chaoyangmen Bridge is Chaoyangmen Inner Street (Chaoyangmen Nei Dajie), which heads toward the Wangfujing, Dongdan and Dongsi areas. The first building north west of Chaoyangmen Bridge is the headquarters of CNOOC Group. The second building westwards is Beijing's most famous "haunted houses", two French-style villas at 81 Chaoyangmen Nei. The main villa was formerly the residence of the French manager of the Pinghan Railway Company until 1947, thereafter it became the offices of various government works until closed pending demolition in the 1990s. However, due to the architectural value of the two villas they were preserved and passed to the Beijing Diocese of the Catholic Church for restoration and use as a church.

East of Chaoyangmen Bridge is where Chaoyang District begins. Chaoyangmen Outer Street also begins east of the overpass, leading to the Chaowai area. The first building northeast of the Chaoyangmen Bridge and exit of Chaoyangmen station is the headquarters of Sinopec Group. Further along Chaoyangmen Outer Street (Chaoyangmen Wai Dajie) is the Zhihua Temple (Zhihua Si), a Buddhist temple constructed during the Ming Dynasty. China's Foreign Ministry building is situated to the southeastern part of the Chaoyangmen Bridge and roundabout.
