= Chen Yupeng =

Chinese composer and music producer

Chen Yupeng 陈宇鹏
- Also known as: Yu Peng; Chen Zhiyi
- Born: Chen Yupeng; January 15, 1984 (age 42); Changsha, Hunan, China
- Origin: Shanghai
- Genres: Film score; orchestral; traditional Chinese music; guofeng; indie; video game music
- Occupations: Composer; music producer
- Instruments: Piano; guitar; clarinet; tin whistle; xiao; vocals
- Years active: 2004–present
- Labels: Knok-Knok Music; Click Music; Deutsche Grammophon; Yupeng Music Studio; Intree Music; HOYO-MiX
- Education: Shenzhen Arts School; Shanghai Conservatory of Music
- Notable work: The Last Tycoon; The Founding of an Army; Moonlight Blade; Genshin Impact
- Children: 1 (b. 2015)

Birth name
- Simplified Chinese: 陈宇鹏
- Traditional Chinese: 陳宇鵬
Transcriptions
Standard Mandarin
- Hanyu Pinyin: Chén Yǔpéng
Yue: Cantonese
- Jyutping: Can4 Jyu5-paang4

Stage name
- Simplified Chinese: 陈致逸
- Traditional Chinese: 陳致逸
Transcriptions
Standard Mandarin
- Hanyu Pinyin: Chén Zhìyì
Yue: Cantonese
- Jyutping: Can4 Zi3-jat6

Chen Yupeng (Chinese: 陈宇鹏; pinyin: Chén Yǔpéng; born January 15, 1984), also known by his stage name Chen Zhiyi (Chinese: 陈致逸; pinyin: Chén Zhìyì), is a Chinese composer and music producer best known for writing the soundtrack of Genshin Impact, an open-world action role-playing video game by HoYoverse. His work is known for its style of integrating traditional Chinese musical instruments with Western orchestral arrangements. From 2019 to 2023, he was a music producer at HOYO-MiX, the in-house music studio of miHoYo, and led the music production of the game.

Chen was educated at Shenzhen Arts School and the Shanghai Conservatory of Music, and studied under the tutelage of experienced musicians who influenced his work later in his career. While he studied in college, he was already involved in composing and producing film and television music. Even before his career, his musical works won awards at various events. Chen established the Yupeng Music Studio in 2014, which had cooperative relations with many recording studios and music groups in Beijing and Shanghai, and produced works for companies, including Click Music Ltd., Tencent, and NetEase.

In the early 2010s, Chen collaborated with the accoladed composer Chan Kwong-wing to produce scores for veteran film directors. Their score for Wong Jing's The Last Tycoon (2012) earned them a nomination for the "Best Original Film Score" at the 32nd Hong Kong Film Awards. The duo would not win an award until their work for The Founding of an Army (2017), which earned the Golden Deer Award for the "Best Original Music Score" at the 14th Changchun Film Festival. They also produced the score for Andrew Lau's The Captain (2019), one of the all-time highest-grossing films in China. Chen had scored several films by Raymond Yip, most being horror or thrillers.

== Early life and education ==
There is no doubt [that] my anticipation for the future actually manifested when I was a child. I remember that time, during solfeggio classes in art school, the teacher asked everyone what they wanted to become. At that time, I volunteered and stood up, saying that I wanted to become a top composer in China. I remember it was when I was in my teens in art school when I already had such an ambition. This should be my pursuit for the future; I must strive to be the best. I want to become the most famous composer in China.

毫无疑问，我对未来的憧憬，其实在我小时候就体现出来。我记得那个时候，上视唱练耳课还是在艺校的时候，老师就问大家想做什么。那个时候，我就自告奋勇站起来，我要做中国第一流的作曲家。我记得那是我在艺校，十几岁的时候，我就已经有这样的一个抱负了。这应该是我对未来的一个追求，我一定要做到最好。我要做中国最有名的作曲家。

— 不急TV interview, Chen Zhiyi: Music That Truly Has a Soul, Will Be Ingrained Deep Into Your Bones

Chen was born on January 15, 1984, in Changsha, Hunan. His mother was a vocalist. To raise Chen, she stopped her career. His father majored in mathematics. The first musical inspiration came to Chen at age six, when he watched the Japanese animated film Nausicaä of the Valley of the Wind (1984) by Hayao Miyazaki. Though he did not understand the story, he was deeply moved by the soundtrack and "felt the power of music" for the first time. During his childhood, he also discovered his musical talent as he was sensitive to pitch.

In 1996, at the age of twelve, Chen enrolled at Shenzhen Arts School and studied under clarinet educators Jiang Baocheng (姜宝成) and Tao Ran (陶然). Tao Ran, a Clarinet associate professor at the school, had performed solo clarinet and chamber music concerts. He received several awards for his excellent instruction and musicianship. Tao, like Chen, also studied under Jiang Baocheng. When Chen was 16, he learned basic theories of composition under Ju Zongze (居宗泽), a teacher and assistant lecturer at Shenzhen Arts School. He taught music theory, solfeggio, etc.

In 2002, Chen permanently moved to Shanghai and was admitted to the Shanghai Conservatory of Music with the Fu Chengxian Memorial Scholarship (傅成贤纪念奖学金). He first studied the clarinet, but Ju Zongze, who discovered Chen's strong interest in composition, suggested that he transfer to a Composition major. Chen later majored in Music Design and Production in the Department of Music Engineering, which was established in 2003. Around the same time, the Shanghai Conservatory of Music invited Japanese musician Tanimura Shinji to join the department as a resident professor. When Chen attended Tanimura's master class in 2005, he noted that Tanimura's work combined Japanese folk music, oriental pentatonic melodies, and Western orchestral music. The learning experience gave much inspiration, especially Tanimura's concepts of "music has no borders" and "spread the positive energy of love". Shortly after that, Chen was one of the eight students from the department to join Tanimura for a concert performance at Expo 2005. He was responsible for the arrangement and production of the musical works, and performed as a pianist. It was also during that year, in November, when he won an award during a song activity organized by Tanimura and the Shanghai Federation of Literary and Art Circles (上海市文联组织) for the opening of the Yangshan Port and Donghai Bridge.

Other than Tanimura, Chen also studied under the tutelage of An Dong (安栋), Chen Qiangbin (陈强斌), Wu Yuebei (吴粤北), Hu Taoyuan (胡桃源), Xu Jianqiang (徐坚强), and Qin Shile (秦诗乐). The different styles, composition philosophies, and approaches to music taught by the first three teachers greatly influenced Chen's work later in his career. While he studied, he also assisted An Dong in producing film and television music.

In September 2006, Chen's work "GAMES OF FANTASIA" won the first prize at the annual concert of the Department of Music Engineering. He also received three awards for the best creativity, teamwork, and popularity. During the same year, he worked with An Dong on the films The Tokyo Trial and Fiery Autumn Wind (西风烈). In June 2007, the department held the Undergraduate Outstanding Graduation Works Concert and Exhibition (本科优秀毕业作品音乐会暨展示会). Chen's "Challenging Hollywood" was selected as the department's outstanding work and won the first prize, and then was performed. Later that year, Chen graduated from the Shanghai Conservatory of Music with honors and joined An Dong's studio.

== Film and television scoring career ==
=== Armor Hero series ===
In 2009, Chen composed the soundtrack for the first season of Armor Warriors, directed by Zheng Guowei (郑国伟). The story tells of five gifted people who don magical battle armor handed down in China since ancient times, and together they become warriors representing the power of light. They fight against forces of darkness to save their world. In 2010, the series was followed by the film Armor Hero Emperor, which Zheng Guowei also directed and Chen scored.

In 2016, Chen composed the theme song "God's Rival" (神的对手) for the film Armor Hero Captor King, with the lyrics provided by Zhou Bingyi (周秉毅) and Jing Qian (镜千). Two years later, since Chen was the composer of the original Armor Warriors, he was invited to be the music director for Armor Hero Chronicles, a film commemorating ten years since the series began. In addition to producing the soundtrack, he composed and sang the ending theme song, "Kaixuan" (铠旋).

=== Collaborations with Chan Kwong-wing ===
At an unknown time, Chen joined Click Music, the studio of Hong Kongese film composer Chan Kwong-wing (陈光荣). Chen accumulated much practical experience at the studio and learned various musical languages and styles since creating film soundtracks had him dabble in genres such as hip-hop, jazz, electronic music, etc. He and Chan worked together to produce the score for The Last Tycoon, a 2012 period drama film directed by Hong Kong cinema veteran Wong Jing (王晶). The film is set in early 1900s Shanghai and follows the story of a tycoon named Cheng Daqi and his associates who get caught in the events of the Second Sino-Japanese War. Chen and Chan Kwong-wing's work on the soundtrack got nominated for the "Best Original Film Score" at the 32nd Hong Kong Film Awards.

Their next collaboration was for Wong Jing's From Vegas to Macau (2014), a crime-comedy film. Chen and Chan also worked on the scores for its sequels From Vegas to Macau II (2015) and From Vegas to Macau III (2016). The three films are part of the God of Gamblers franchise. After From Vegas to Macau III, Chen and Chan worked on the score of The Founding of an Army (2017), a historical drama film directed by Andrew Lau (劉偉強) commemorating the 90th anniversary of the founding of the People's Liberation Army. Their work earned them the Golden Deer Award for the "Best Original Music Score" at the 14th Changchun Film Festival. They next worked on Andrew Lau's The Captain in 2019, a film based on the events surrounding Sichuan Airlines Flight 8633. It was one of the films that competed in the Golden Deer Awards at the 15th Changchun Film Festival in 2020.

=== Raymond Yip films ===
"Teacher Chen Zhiyi has composed music for several suspense films such as The House That Never Dies and Phantom of the Theatre. In his music, you can hear a deep understanding of the films themselves, which are tightly intertwined with the storyline while striking a chord with the audience. It can be said that he has a remarkably distinctive personal style in the field of music composition."

— NetEase Entertainment, 2018

The first film score Chen independently produced was for Bump in the Road, a 2013 comedy film directed by Raymond Yip (葉偉民). The film's story tells of a man named Zhang Kai who suddenly receives an ultrasound image of his child; he embarks on a road trip with his younger brother Xin to search for the child's mother. Chen provided his vocals for the songs "Snatch the Bouquet" (抢花球), "On the Road" (在路上), and "Far Place" (远方).

In 2014, Chen returned to score Raymond Yip's The House That Never Dies, a thriller film based on the haunted house Chaonei No. 81. Director Yip gave great importance to the music and did not give restrictions on producing the soundtrack. It was a challenge for Chen as he had no reference for the music, so he created the style, structure, tempo, and orchestration himself. Yip approved the overall design of the music. The film was a box-office hit and became the highest-grossing Chinese horror film. The 2017 sequel, The House That Never Dies II, was directed by Qian Renhao (钱人豪). Chen composed its ending theme song, "Soul Returns" (回魂).

In January 2015, the suspense thriller film Tales of Mystery, directed by Raymond Yip, Tian Meng (田蒙), and Xian Xuchu (咸旭初), was released. Its music production was the first test of Chen's creative techniques in the genre of horror music and influenced his work on The House That Never Dies. The film is divided into three acts, each having a unique musical style. The first story is "Japanese-style creepy," the second is "American-style brutal," and the third is "heartwarming with emotions".

The next film directed by Raymond Yip was Phantom of the Theatre in 2016, a thriller like his two previous works. The story tells of a haunted theater filled with the spirits of a performance troupe that perished in a fire many years prior. What Chen found to be most time-consuming in producing the music was not the rigorous score and complex engineering but making the score rich while not complicated, concise but not monotonous. Aside from horror music, Chen took on four themes for the soundtrack: fate, love, and the ordinary and magical sides of the Palace Theater. These themes blend and change with each other. Chen composed "The Mist," the film's theme song that takes on love. His score for the film had received both praise and criticism. Jonathan Broxton of Movie Music UK, in his film score review, wrote, "Phantom of the Theatre has, quite rightly, been the recipient of quite a bit of critical praise in 2016, and despite its flaws I certainly recommend it for anyone wanting to dip their toes into Chinese film music."

=== Butterfly Cemetery ===
In April 2016, Chen was invited to produce the score for Butterfly Cemetery. A film based on a novel of the same name by Cai Jun (蔡骏) and directed by Ma Weihao (马伟豪), it tells of a woman named Shang Xiaodi who meets a half-butterfly man during a trip to Budapest. Compared to his previous film works, Chen chose a more modern style for the music, and the techniques he employed were influenced by German composer Hans Zimmer's minimalist style. Since the story is set in Hungary, Chen incorporated Hungarian elements into the music. The music production went on for five months, and the film was released in October 2017.

=== Magic Town ===
In 2015, Motion Magic (幻维数码) invited Chen to compose songs for Magic Town, an educational program for children. Most of the creative team were first-time parents or had young children, including Chen, whose partner was expecting their daughter. As Chen was about to become a father, he was motivated and proud to take on the project. Magic Town had nearly a hundred songs that took almost two years to produce, and many were improvised by Chen when he first worked on them. Chen considered the diversity of musical styles and incorporated elements from various genres such as folk, jazz, rock, electronic dance, new age, etc. He also took into account the fact that children are "exposed to advanced knowledge and culture". Therefore, he used trendy elements for nursery rhymes. The overall experience of working on the project was much different compared to Chen's past film and television works in terms of emotions. In film music, various emotions are present, including negative ones such as anger, fear, anxiety, and depression; Chen felt these as he composed. Magic Town was different because of its overall positive, bright themes. The show premiered in December 2016. At the same time, the music was released across four albums.

== Game music production ==
=== Moonlight Blade ===
In 2015, Chen began to work as one of the music producers for Moonlight Blade, a martial arts-themed MMORPG by Tencent Games. He was under the guidance of music director Yang Jie (杨结), who was strict about innovation in music. Chen went beyond limits in producing his work for them to reach their best quality. He incorporated new instruments into his works, such as traditional Chinese instruments, which, according to Chen, made the style of the game music "refreshing". He was also interested in integrating elements of Chinese folk music into the soundtrack to create a "new national style" of folk music to promote Chinese culture. While working on the game, he also built his own fan base. He began to care more about players' preferences as regular communication with them brought changes to his ideas; he made his music more inclusive and integrated more elements into it. Through all this, Chen established his confidence in music as he formed his style and direction.

Many filmmakers were involved in the game's story creation, martial arts action, art style, costume design, etc. In the process, the game incorporated cinematic creation techniques. Following this, Chen requested to produce the landing music at the level of film music. He composed the soundtrack "Thousand People, Thousand Faces" (千人千面), which plays at the beginning of the game as the player selects and modifies their character. Chen noted that the landing music shapes the first impression of the whole game. Therefore, the music was based not solely on the theme of martial arts but on the curiosity and enthusiasm felt by players when exploring the game world. Also noted was that treating the music with high requirements and quality was unavoidable. The arpeggio elements in the music from Final Fantasy inspired Chen's work on the track. In February 2017, Chen released an album containing his works for Moonlight Blade from 2015 to 2017, including "Thousand People, Thousand Faces" in the tracklist. Chen later adapted the song into "Wind of the World" (八荒之风), a theme song for The World of Swinging Swords (剑荡八荒) competition in November 2017.

In 2018, Chen composed the theme song "Dreams of Farewell" (梦留别) for Yihua (移花), one of the martial arts sects players can choose to join upon creating their character. The theme of the song was based on a soundtrack previously created for Moonlight Blade, "Treading the Waves in the Sea" (沧海踏浪) by Liang Bangyan (梁邦彦). It was a challenge since the theme may not be suitable for singing, and for Chen to adapt the work of a senior composer he admired. Previously, Chen arranged theme songs by himself. This time, to bring new ideas to players, he invited a composer from Beijing, Cui Zhi'en (崔知恩), to participate in the song production. Another person was supposed to work on the sound mixing, but since each revision brought new inspiration, Chen mixed the song himself. The song was written by Wubi (无比) and sung by Zhou Shen (周深).

In 2019, Chen produced the Taibai (太白) sect theme, "Saying Sword." Wang Yibo (王一博) provided his vocals for the song. The folk music and strings were performed by Qingqin Qingqing and the International Master Philharmonic Orchestra (国际首席爱乐乐团), respectively. "Saying Sword" was Chen's final work for Moonlight Blade before producing the soundtrack for Genshin Impact.

=== Genshin Impact ===
"Actually, Chen Zhiyi had been trying to do this a long time ago. The current combination and integration of traditional Chinese music and symphonic music, what the audience and players are more concerned about is whether traditional Chinese music and symphonic music can blend together, rather than just being put together like adding eggs and rice in a stir-fry. I believe that what matters is whether the music is beautiful and whether it embodies the spirit of China. As for the original soundtrack for this time, I think it is of high quality."

— An Dong, "Songs of Travelers" — Behind the Scenes of the Music of Liyue

In 2019, video game developer company miHoYo got Chen to produce the soundtrack for their title Genshin Impact with their in-house music studio HOYO-MiX. It was Chen's first major video game work, and he described the project as a difficult challenge. The game has an open-world environment that features areas referred to as regions, with visual designs inspired by different world cultures. In composing the music for these regions, Chen chose a style that integrates elements of traditional folk music with Western musical arrangements. During the pre-release development stage, the game only featured Mondstadt and Liyue, two of the planned seven regions. On top of idyllic rural scenery, medieval European architectural styles and cultures inspired the design of Mondstadt. In composing the music for Mondstadt, Chen borrowed the language and rhythm of Impressionism and used the piano, tin whistle instruments, and medieval-style lutes. The Mondstadt soundtrack was performed by the London Philharmonic Orchestra. Chen was present during the scoring sessions in London and conducted some scores himself, including the "Genshin Impact Main Theme." For Liyue, which had scenic Eastern fantasy as its basis, he used elements of Chinese folk music—traditional instruments, the pentatonic scale, and ancient tonal melodies—with Western romantic harmonies and orchestral arrangements. The Liyue soundtrack was performed by the Shanghai Symphony Orchestra. An Dong (安栋), one of Chen's mentors from the Shanghai Conservatory of Music, served as a music supervisor during the scoring sessions of the soundtrack. Chen especially enjoyed composing combat music, using various composition techniques such as polyphony and taking orchestration elements from composers such as Ludwig van Beethoven.

Even from the perspective of industry development, the music of Chinese games produced by Chinese composers still has a relatively long way to go. Although it is a pity that Genshin Impact was not nominated for the "best original soundtrack" of TGA 2020, I feel very proud that foreign players can learn more about the Chinese folk music created by Chinese composers through games. [We] will continue to work hard and live up to the expectations of our players who have invested a lot of time in Genshin Impact!

中国游戏的原创音乐即便从行业发展来看，可能也需要漫长一段时间的探索，虽说有些遗憾原神未能入选TGA2020的最佳原声音乐的提名，但是能通过游戏传播让国外玩家感受到中国作曲家创作的国风音乐我觉得已经很令人骄傲了。继续努力前行吧，不能辜负那些在原神游戏投入大量时间的玩家们的期待！

In a Sina Weibo post published in November 2020, Chen expressed disappointment that Genshin Impact did not get nominated for "Best Original Soundtrack" at The Game Awards 2020. Nevertheless, he expressed his pride as a Chinese composer. Chen later got awarded "Outstanding Artist – Newcomer/Breakthrough" at the Annual Game Music Awards 2020 held by the music journalism website Video Game Music Online (VGMO). He also spoke to VGMO in an interview about future music-related offline activities, including concerts. The first concert for Genshin Impact was held in October 2021 through an online event to celebrate the game's first anniversary. Among the involved performers was Belgian composer and conductor Dirk Brossé, who conducted Chen's nominated work "The Curse of Blood" at the 2019 World Soundtrack Awards.

In 2022, a selected number of Genshin Impact soundtracks, including Chen's compositions "Liyue," "Rapid as Wildfires," and "Contemplation in Snow," got included in the 2022 Winter Olympics music library to be used in sports exhibitions. "Contemplation in Snow" was featured in a promotional video for the Beijing National Speed Skating Oval, a competition area constructed specially for the event.

==== Departure ====
Based on the plans for my personal creative journey, after careful consideration and several discussions with the company, I have chosen to leave miHoYo and the HOYO-MiX team to pursue my own music dreams! [...] In the future, I will continue to explore the path of music. I plan to release a new album of purely instrumental music next year, and the specific plans will be announced in the future. I hope you will continue to support my creations. From now on, I will continue to travel through Teyvat with everyone as a Traveler!

根据我个人一些创作计划的安排，经过一段时间的慎重考虑，以及和公司的几次交流，我选择离开米哈游和HOYO-MiX团队去继续追寻自己的音乐梦想了！ [...] 在未来我还会继续在音乐道路上不断探索，明年打算发行一张个人纯音乐作品新专辑，具体计划安排会在未来公布，希望大家继续支持我的创作。以后就以旅行者的身份和大家一起继续游玩提瓦特啦！

On September 12, 2023, Chen announced on his Sina Weibo and Bilibili profiles that after careful consideration, he had chosen to leave the miHoYo company and its music studio, HOYO-MiX, to pursue his personal interests. He stated that he will continue to explore [his] path of music, and plans to release his own instrumental music album in 2024.

=== Project Woolgatherer ===
On July 23, 2024, it was announced that Chen Zhiyi had been invited to compose four original soundtrack pieces for Project Woolgatherer (无尽梦回), a roguelite action-adventure mobile game centered on the theme of dreams. The compositions included "The Neverending Dream" (无尽梦回), "Dreams Aglow" (梦的流光), "To Dream's End" (向无际彼岸), and "So Sleeps the Soul" (万物沉眠), all of which were featured in the game's first original soundtrack album, A Promise of Dreams (赴梦之约).

Chen's involvement came at a crucial time, as the production team had been facing difficulties with the game's music. Producer Liu Ming remarked, "To be honest, we couldn't believe our ears. Chen Zhiyi is the music director of Genshin Impact! Having him join the project felt like a dream come true."

=== Justice ===
On September 16, 2024, Justice (逆水寒) announced the launch of an independent music brand named "Nishui Changqin" (逆水长琴), created exclusively for the game and its players. This initiative aims to promote traditional Chinese music, inspired by the figure of Prince Changqin from "Classic of Mountains and Seas," and to bridge cultural communication through music. The game's developers have partnered with Chen to lead this project.

Hello everyone! When I previously answered your questions, I mentioned wanting to continue exploring more possibilities in Chinese-style music. As you can see, in the coming days, I will be collaborating deeply with the Justice music label, Nishui Changqin, to make new attempts and creative fusions in traditional Chinese music. I'm really looking forward to this new journey, and I hope to use music as a language to tell more new stories in this new world, letting the world hear the sounds of China.

哈喽大家好，之前回答大家问题的时候，我曾说过想要去继续挖掘国风音乐更多的可能性。正如大家所见，未来的日子里，我将和逆水寒音乐厂牌——逆水长琴进行深度的合作，在国乐上进行新的尝试和新的碰撞。我很期待这段新的旅程，希望可以用音乐作为语言，在新的江湖讲更多新的故事，让世界听见国乐。

The music, set to debut in the Version 2.2 expansion, will infuse every aspect of the game, from environments to dungeons and storylines, with a rich blend of Chen's unique style and Chinese cultural elements. This partnership marks the beginning of a long-term collaboration between Justice and Chen, with plans for more diverse and innovative music in future updates. The game studio has pledged to provide Chen with creative freedom and resources to further explore and push the boundaries of traditional Chinese music in gaming.

The meeting with Justice was like a fleeting glimpse, yet also love at first sight. I'm very happy to have met a like-minded new friend, which has strengthened my belief in "letting the world hear Chinese music. I hope that in the days to come, I can create more works that everyone loves, bringing more heartfelt melodies to this martial world. The road ahead is long, but may our bonds in Justice last forever!

逆水寒的相逢是"惊鸿一面"，也是"一见钟情"。很高兴能够认识这样一位志同道合的新朋友，让我更加坚定"让世界听见国乐"的理念。希望在未来的日子里，我能创作出更多受大家喜爱的作品，为这个江湖带来更多触人心弦的旋律。 江湖路远，愿我们逆水长"情"！

== Personal projects ==
=== 2017: Time Tunnel and Midnight Radio ===
"I used to own a bar, on Shanghai's Huangjincheng Road, which is a very quiet lane. One day I was walking on this lane alone at midnight, and an idea of rhythm suddenly came. I told it to my partner Tian Chenming, and it really hit off with the lyrics he came out. This song has a bit of dark humour, which is especially suitable for fast-paced, vaguely melodic rap, and it was my favourite genre at the time. So in one go, this song was born."

— Description of Midnight Radio

On April 14, 2017, Chen released the singles "Midnight Radio" and "Time Tunnel." He composed both songs while Tian Chenming (田辰明) wrote the lyrics. They previously collaborated on various projects, including Armor Hero Emperor (2010), Painted Skin: The Resurrection (2012), and Bump in the Road (2013).

"Midnight Radio" started with a rhythm that came to Chen's mind as he walked down an empty road at night. He shared this with Tian, who came up with lyrics. Tian later explained in a comment that the convenience store mentioned at the beginning of the song is a Lawson store located at the intersection of Fuxing Road and Maoming Road. What also inspired the lyrics are the times he squatted on the side of the road to smoke cigarettes in the middle of the night and the clerk at the store would play the midnight radio. Chen wrote "Time Tunnel" eight years before its release when he had planned to release ten songs in "honor of his passing youth". He then intended to dedicate these songs to those who supported him, and his friend Tian had also encouraged him multiple times to release his own song album. Tian commented on the song, "The lyrics were written in 2009, and now it's already 2017. It wasn't until recently that Zhiyi finished recording and released them. Unconsciously, there have been significant changes in choice of words, habits, and style, as well as different themes for different age groups. Every time I seriously contemplate this, it feels like stepping into a time tunnel."

=== 2018: You're Not Here and A Cup of Moon ===
In 2018, Chen collaborated with lyricist Jing Qian (镜千) to produce the song "You're Not Here" (你，不在这里). The song was based on a poem that Jing wrote at the time his grandfather had died, two years prior to the song's creation. When Chen read the poem for the first time, his grandfather had also recently died. He decided to finish the song in one go as his grandmother was also seriously ill. And before releasing the song, Chen had many of his relatives and his grandmother listen to it before she died. The song was released on February 1, 2018. Chen said, "I personally think that this is a completely non-commercial song about family affection, expressing my deepest thoughts. I hope that others can understand my feelings, but I don't want it to be overly snooped on by people. I hesitated for a long time between publishing it or not. In the end, I chose to let more people hear it and call for more memories of my loved ones."

Chen and Jing next worked on "A Cup of Moon" (一杯月), together with music engineers He Jiade (何迦德) and Kaola (考拉), and mixing engineer Liu Junjie (刘俊杰). It was a song originally made for the Qingqin Qingqing (轻琴謦磬) band, hence its length of six minutes. Yin Lin (银临), a singer Chen invited to participate in the project, persistently suggested shortening the song, but Chen continued with his vision. He also completed the arrangement in one sitting during an eight-hour-long live broadcast. The recording and mixing took half a year, and the song was released on October 6, 2018.

=== 2019: Being Towards Death ===
Being Towards Death

Studio album by Chen Zhiyi
- Released: April 2, 2019
- Studio: Yupeng Music Studio
- Genre: Mandopop
- Length: 1:10:27
- Language: Mandarin
- Producer: Chen Zhiyi

Chen Zhiyi chronology
一杯月 (2018)	Being Towards Death (2019)	Desert Solitary Smoke (2019)

After two years of production, Chen digitally released his first original album, Being Towards Death, on April 2, 2019. It includes various works created over ten years and features new recordings of previously released works, such as "Midnight Radio," "Time Tunnel," and "A Cup of Moon." The production of the album was supported through crowdfunding. With an initial goal of 30,000 RMB, the project raised 38,000. According to lyricist and project planner Jing Qian, the difficulty of the production lay in the communication as each song involved illustrators, video creators, and other artists. All songs he worked on got revised at least twice before arriving at the finished product; "A Cup of Moon" got revised at least three times. He also described Chen's attitude towards music as "rigorous". Column editor Xiao Xiao (小小), explaining a bit of the production, said, "Recently, Teacher Chen has really gone all out for his beloved album. He works until one or two in the morning every day, just to optimize and refine every single piece during this last bit of time. He has even re-recorded several songs all over again. So, even for songs that have already been released on NetEase Cloud [Music], there are significant differences in the new album. The editor even starts to wonder if Teacher Chen is a Virgo, given his meticulousness and attention to detail."

Track listing
No.	Title	English title	Length
1.	"向死而生"	"Being Towards Death"	03:16
2.	"时光隧道"	"Time Tunnel"	04:34
3.	"旅人"	"The Traveler"	03:04
4.	"以梦为食"	"Feeding on Dreams"	04:01
5.	"双城"	"Love at Distance"	05:50
6.	"罗生门"	"Rashomon"	04:40
7.	"木叶蝶"	"Kallima inachus"	04:19
8.	"暗流"	"Undercurrent"	04:43
9.	"迷失灵魂"	"The Lost Soul"	03:43
10.	"49%的我"	"49% Of Me"	04:24
11.	"存在"	"Hymn of Being"	05:19
12.	"遗忘"	"Oblivion"	05:00
13.	"午夜电台"	"Radio at Midnight"	02:48
14.	"惊蛰"	"Vernal Awakening"	05:03
15.	"一杯月"	"The Moon in a Cup of Wine"	06:06
16.	"锦色"	"Golden Hues"	04:17
Total length:			01:10:27

=== 2024: FANTASYLAND ===
FANTASYLAND

Studio album by Chen Zhiyi
- Released: July 18, 2024
- Studio: Yupeng Music Studio
- Genres: Orchestral music, traditional Chinese music
- Length: 52:51
- Languages: Mandarin, English
- Producer: Chen Zhiyi

Chen Zhiyi chronology
The Curse of Blood (2019)	FANTASYLAND (2024)

This is a reflection on the past from young Chinese composer Chen Zhiyi, while also serving as a new introduction to the future. Fantasyland showcases Chen's signature musical style, infused with boundless creative inspiration, and highlights the limitless possibilities that emerge from the combination of traditional Chinese instruments and orchestral music. This album embodies Chen Zhiyi's most grand and imaginative musical concepts to date, crafted in collaboration with world-class musicians and the London Philharmonic Orchestra. Its flowing melodies unfold like a kaleidoscope, with beautiful notes weaving a colorful picture of a fantasy playground, presenting listeners with a dreamlike wonderland.

Honoring the past and looking toward the future, Chen embarks on a new journey filled with unknowns but also endless possibilities. Through this album, Chen hopes to allow people to understand and appreciate his ongoing growth, transformation, and rebirth, as well as the musical stories he has personally crafted.

这是中国青年作曲家陈致逸对过往岁月的总结，同时也是一张递交给未来的崭新名片。《幻想乐园 Fantasyland》以陈致逸擅长的音乐风格，加以无拘无束的奇妙灵感，全面展现了民族器乐与管弦乐相结合所迸发出的无限可能。这张专辑承载着陈致逸迄今为止最为庞大绮丽的音乐构想，携手多位世界一流演奏家、伦敦爱乐乐团共同倾力打造。悠扬旋律如万花筒般层层绽放，美妙音符交织出缤纷游园画卷，向乐迷呈现梦想中的奇幻乐园。

致敬过往，眺望未来。新的旅途纵有未知，无限可能则更为可贵。陈致逸希望借这张专辑，让大家了解和认识一直在前进、成长、蜕变、新生的自己，以及那一些他亲手绘制的音乐故事......

— Album description

On July 12, 2024, Chen had published a video across several platforms where he spoke of a significant career change at 40, and deciding to create a personal instrumental album with renowned musicians from both China and abroad. Reflecting on his 17-year career, he highlighted his work on Genshin Impact and its global success. Despite his love for composing, he decided to step aside to allow opportunities for the younger composers in HOYO-MiX and to pursue his own musical dreams. He had also expressed hope that his new album will surprise and resonate with listeners, and thanked his supporters for their encouragement. On the same day, a promotional video was published featuring Chen together with conductor Robert Ziegler and the London Philharmonic Orchestra.

On July 15, a music video for the piece "Infinite Cloister of Flowers and Sins" (花与罪的无限回廊) was published. It is one of the two music videos created to promote Chen's music album FANTASYLAND (幻想乐园). On July 18, a music video for the piece "Circle Dance of the Evernight Castle" (永夜之城的轮舞) was published.

FANTASYLAND released on July 18, 2024. Its album cover was illustrated by Chinese-American artist Yan Wenqing (颜温情), known by her handle "Yuumei."

Track listing
No.	Title	English title	Length
1.	"新的旅程"	"A New Journey"	01:55
2.	"幻想乐园"	"Welcome to Fantasyland!"	03:03
3.	"向着地图上的空白"	"Towards the Blanks on the Map"	03:12
4.	"海与月的女儿"	"Daughter of the Sea and the Moon"	06:26
5.	"永夜之城的轮舞"	"Circle Dance of the Evernight Castle"	06:13
6.	"天空的指环"	"Ring of the Sky"	05:24
7.	"花与罪的无限回廊"	"Infinite Cloister of Flowers and Sins"	06:27
8.	"向尖顶攀升的俯冲"	"Ascending Dive Towards the Pyramidion"	05:32
9.	"雪融之境的繁光"	"Flourishing Lights of the Snowmelt Realm"	07:01
10.	"再见，朋友"	"Farewell, My Friend!"	04:26
11.	"回忆"	"Reminiscence"	03:08
Total length:			52:51

==== Chen Zhiyi Music Concert ====
On October 28, 2024, the "Old Friends, New Voices" Chen Zhiyi Music Concert 2024 was officially announced on Sina Weibo. Co-produced by Shanghai Yinxu Culture Communication Co., Ltd. (上海音序文化传播有限公司) and Poly Arts and Entertainment Innovation (保利演艺), the concert will feature the Shanghai Philharmonic Orchestra alongside many outstanding musicians. Held from December 14 to 15, 2024, at the Shanghai North Bund AIA Grand Theater (上海北外滩友邦大剧院), the event showcased tracks from Chen's FANTASYLAND album, compositions from his past video game soundtracks—including Moonlight Blade, The Legend of Sword and Fairy 7, and Justice—as well as notable singles such as "The Moon in a Cup of Wine" (一杯月) and "Fu Sheng" (浮生).

== Other works and activities ==
=== Shanghai Conservatory of Music ===
==== Digital Audio China ====
In October 2009, the eARTS Digital Audio Competition by Digital Audio China officially launched. It was an event organized by the Shanghai Conservatory of Music, the China Association of Recording Engineers (中国录音师协会), and Yangpu District government to promote China's development and research in digital audio and related fields. The competition's judging panel included musical engineers Simon Rhodes of Abbey Road Studios, Nick Wollage of AIR Studios, and record producer Quincy Jones, among others. During the semi-finals, Chen placed second in Recording Art and first in the Music Arrangement and Multimedia Soundtrack categories. Shanghai Yinxu Culture Communication Co., Ltd. (上海音序文化传播有限公司), also known as Intree Music, represented him, which Chen heads. At the finals held in March 2010, he won the first prize in the Multimedia Soundtrack category, second prize in Recording Art, and third prize in Music Arrangement. Chen commented in an interview during the awards gala, "I originally participated in this competition with the mentality of giving [it] a try. I feel that winning the award is a kind of affirmation for me and my music!"

In April 2012, Chen participated as a guest at the second Digital Audio Competition by Digital Audio China. He joined the event with two other first-prize winners from the first competition in 2010, Peng Fei (彭飞) and Guo Shensheng (郭申生). Their commissioned works were performed at the awards gala.

After three events of the Digital Audio Competition, the Shanghai Conservatory of Music held the International Digital Music Festival in December 2021. The event was jointly organized by the Shanghai Music and Art Development Collaborative Innovation Center (上海音乐艺术发展协同创新中心), game developer company miHoYo, and their music studio HOYO-MiX. It saw the participation of local and foreign digital music industry veterans and university subject leaders. It also included forums and lectures on recording art, film and video game music, etc. Chen participated in the event to gave a lecture on the music production of Genshin Impact, where he shared the process of game music production based on his own experience, including: frame drafting, MIDI arrangement production, score production, orchestral recording, sound mixing and mastering, and soundtrack music naming and illustration design. During the lecture, Chen also shared his experience of cooperating with orchestras and musicians from different countries in the process of music production through a large number of video materials. He talked about the concept of "huayong" (化用) in creation, connecting it to absorption of the essence of Western musical elements and turning them into internal skills of his own music creation.

The next International Digital Music Festival took place from October to December 2022. Chen and miHoYo music director Cai Jinhan (蔡近翰) joined as game music team judges.

==== School program lecture ====
In July 2016, the Shanghai Conservatory of Music hosted an art summer school program for academic graduate students. The program focused on the theme of music and technology, and with activities covering the research, production, and performance of music. Chen was invited alongside several other teachers and experts in the music industry to give lectures. For his lecture, he discussed his work for Phantom of the Theatre (2016), explaining the music production process of the score.

=== Shanghai Expo 2010 ===
From May to October, Shanghai hosted the Expo 2010. Among the various organized activities was a large-scale parade performed every day. One of its routes was the Puxi Line at Longhua East Road, for which Chen composed the theme song "Good Dream Is a Song" (好梦是歌).

=== Beautiful Sunday clarinet concert ===
On July 24, 2012, Clarinet associate professor Tao Ran (陶然) of Shenzhen Arts School hosted a clarinet concert at the Shenzhen Concert Hall. The concert included performances covering classical, romantic, and jazz styles. He also led ten students, including Chen, to perform eight clarinet works in the form of solo and chamber music, including Felix Mendelssohn's "Concert Piece No. 2," André Messager's "Solo de Concours," and Franz Krommer's "Clarinet Concerto No. 1, Op. 36." Chen composed an original piece specially for the concert, "Legend" (传奇), for the piano and clarinet.

Tao Ran again hosted the Beautiful Sunday clarinet concert on November 19, 2017, which was sponsored by the Propaganda Department of the Shenzhen Municipal Party Committee (深圳市委宣传部) and the Shenzhen Municipal Bureau of Culture, Sports and Tourism (深圳市文体旅游局). Alongside "Legend," more original works by Chen were performed for the concert: "Mystery" (迷), "Discovery" (发现), "Emergency" (意外), "Truth" (真相), and "Challenge" (挑战).

=== Wuhan Conservatory of Music ===
On November 13, 2016, Chen carried out a lecture at the Wuhan Conservatory of Music as part of their three-day Applied Electronic Music Forum. The lecture was titled "The Production Process of Film Music: Taking 'Phantom of the Theatre' as an Example" (电影音乐的制作流程——以<墨宫魅影>为例). The next day, Chen, together with composer and music producer Shen Dan (沈丹), carried out a master class on applied electronic music.

=== Qingqin Qingqing band ===
In 2017, Chen founded Qingqin Qingqing (轻琴謦磬), also called 4Q, a band that focuses on the Zhongguo Feng genre. The band includes a dozen members, each having a different traditional instrument, such as the erhu, dizi, xiao, and guzheng. According to pipa musician Juanmo (眷墨), "Qín" (琴) and "Qìng" (磬) refer to music and ancient music, respectively. The third character, "Qìng" (謦), means relaxed or happy. Together, these characters express a scene where a group of friends who love ancient music get together to play music with ease and joy.

In June 2018, the singles "Endless" (无疆) and "Twelve Gods" (十二神肖), both composed by Chen, were released on online music platforms. On July 22, Qingqin Qingqing debuted at Bilibili Macro Link (BML), a concert event held at the Mercedes-Benz Arena in Shanghai. The event saw more than 4.5 million people from offline and online audiences.

=== Music+Technology Festival ===
==== 2024 ====
From March to April 2024, Chen was involved as one of the five Artist Ambassadors in the Digital Muse: 2024 Music+Technology Festival (数字缪斯——2024音乐科技融创节), centered on the fusion of artificial intelligence with musical composition. He participated in the evaluation and selection process of submitted works, providing guidance, recommendations, and support for the music creations featured in this festival, which was hosted by the Cadillac Shanghai Concert Hall. The aim of the event was "supporting musicians to explore the fusion innovation of music and modern technology, promoting the creation and development of digital music works, and providing an international showcase platform for outstanding original music works".

==== 2025 ====
On March 13, 2025, Cadillac Shanghai Concert Hall officially launched the Digital Muse: 2025 Music+Technology Festival and held a press conference to mark the occasion. Chen attended as one of the festival's judges. During the event, he shared insights on how technological advancements have influenced his creative process, sparking new inspirations and perspectives in his compositions. As a key figure in the festival, Chen will help evaluate performances and interactive exhibition works selected through a global call for submissions. The event, running from March to April 2025, will feature performances, exhibitions, creative workshops, and forums, alongside special highlights like the AI Story Tavern, Music & Tech Investment Sharing Session, Outdoor Music & Tech Market, and Music & Light Show.

=== 2025 Wave Music Forum ===
On June 18, 2025, Chen was invited to participate in the 2025 Wave Music Forum, joining the Game Music Roundtable alongside fellow panelists Li Jiaqi and Xu Wutong, founders of 8082 Audio Studio, and Zhong Qing, host of the podcast Chinese: 不在场 and a regular guest on GCORES Radio. Together, they engaged in an in-depth discussion on the theme "Rethinking Game Music and the Beauty of Collaborative Creation" (Chinese: 重新理解游戏音乐与集体创作之美). During the forum, Chen remarked that the game industry is reshaping the music industry. He noted that video games embrace an extraordinary diversity of musical styles, while music itself connects directly with players on an emotional level. One notable outcome, he explained, is that many gamers today have become more open to listening to classical music and are even inspired to attend concert halls. Chen added that this spirit of inclusivity has also helped him define his own artistic identity: as a Chinese composer, he strives to blend Chinese musical elements with Western orchestral traditions and musical influences from cultures around the world.

=== Deutsche Grammophon ===
It is a tremendous honor to sign with Deutsche Grammophon, With the support of the DG team, I feel confident about the future of my journey in classical music. I look forward to sharing my music with new audiences around the world, and I also hope to take this opportunity to give back to the fans who have supported me all along. To me, music knows no boundaries. I have always wanted to keep exploring new possibilities by blending the language of Western orchestral music with traditional Chinese instruments, as well as the diverse musical elements found in cultures across the world.

能够与德意志留声机签约，我感到非常荣幸，在DG团队的支持下，我对自己在古典音乐道路上的未来发展充满信心。期待更多来自世界各地的新听众能够听到我的音乐，也希望借此机会回馈一直以来支持我的乐迷。对我而言，音乐没有边界。我始终希望不断探索，将西方的管弦乐语言与中国传统乐器，以及世界多元文化中的声音元素交融在一起。

On July 18, 2025, Chen signed with the classical music label Deutsche Grammophon, becoming the first Chinese composer to join the label. The announcement coincided with the unveiling of several upcoming projects. On November 7, 2025, Deutsche Grammophon released the Deluxe Edition of Chen's 2024 album FANTASYLAND. The expanded edition features four exclusive bonus tracks, one of which is a piano arrangement of a newly added composition, while a physical release is planned for 2026. Prior to the album's release, "Summer Fantasy" and "The Inn Beneath the Starry Sky" were issued individually as preview singles. Chen also announced that his future collaborations with Deutsche Grammophon will include a brand-new orchestral album scheduled for release in 2026, as well as a collection of piano solo works.

=== Other stage events ===
On January 1, 2017, Chen participated in the Moonlight Blade Guofeng Carnival theme music exhibition, which was held at the Sun Palace Magic Theater in Nanjing City.

From May to June 2017, Chen participated as a judge in the Guofeng Cover Singing Contest (国风翻唱大赛) held by DouYu and Tencent.

In 2018, Chen participated in the Xuanwuji Guofeng Music Festival (玄武纪•国风音乐盛典), where he performed the song "Brocade" (锦色) with Jiu Quan (圈九). The song was later released as "Brocade Colors" in Chen's 2019 album Being Towards Death, with the female vocals performed by Bu Cai (不才).

== Filmography ==
=== Film ===
Year	Title	Director(s)	Notes and Ref.
2006	The Tokyo Trial	Gao Qunshu	Co-composed with An Dong
2006	西风烈	Dong Ling	Co-composed with An Dong
2009	Ace Mission	Feng Danian	Co-composed with Peng Meng
2010	Armor Hero Emperor	Zheng Guowei	
2011	球迷达人	Duanmu Zhidong	Co-composed with Tian Mi and Zhang Man
2012	Painted Skin: The Resurrection	Wuershan	Promotional song, "Painting Love" (画情)
2012	时间档案馆	Andrew Lau	Co-composed with Chan Kwong-wing
2012	The Last Tycoon	Wong Jing	Co-composed with Chan Kwong-wing
2013	Bump in the Road	Raymond Yip	
2014	From Vegas to Macau	Wong Jing	Co-composed with Chan Kwong-wing
2014	The House That Never Dies	Raymond Yip	
2015	Tales of Mystery	Raymond Yip; Tian Meng; Xian Xuchu	
2015	From Vegas to Macau II	Wong Jing	Co-composed with Chan Kwong-wing
2015	The Grow 2	Ha Lei	
2015	Youth Never Returns	Tian Meng	
2016	From Vegas to Macau III	Wong Jing; Andrew Lau	Co-composed with Chan Kwong-wing
2016	Phantom of the Theatre	Raymond Yip	
2016	Armor Hero Captor King	Zheng Guowei	Theme song, "God's Rival" (神的对手)
2017	The House That Never Dies II	Qian Renhao	Theme song, "Soul Returns" (回魂)
2017	The Founding of an Army	Andrew Lau	Co-composed with Chan Kwong-wing
2017	Butterfly Cemetery	Ma Weihao	
2018	The Taste of Apple	Zhao Qi	Co-composed with Lu Yin
2019	The Captain	Andrew Lau	Co-composed with Chan Kwong-wing
2021	The Last Judgement	Han Zhi	Co-composed with Lu Yin

=== Television ===
Year	Title	Director(s)	Notes and Ref.
2006	此情可问天	Jiang Cheng	Co-composed with An Dong
2009	Armor Hero	Zheng Guowei	
2009	La Fille au fond du verre à saké	Emmanuel Sapolsky	
2013	Heroes of Sui and Tang Dynasties	Zhong Shaoxiong	
2016	Magic Town	Li Yan	
2018	Medical Examiner Dr. Qin	Li Shuang; Chen Jiahong	Season 2
2018	Armor Hero Chronicles	Lu Xing	

=== Animation ===
Year	Title	Studio(s)	Notes and Ref.
2016	THE GRAY	壳际科技	
2016	择天记	China Literature; Tencent Video	Season 2 theme song, "Trace the Source" (溯源)
2017	The Mysteries of Tong	抖動文化Studio D.	Theme song, "Chasing
2017	勇者大冒险	Tencent Animation	Season 2 theme song, "The Waking of Insects" (惊蛰)
2018	Disintegration	抖動文化Studio D.	Season 2 theme songs, "Lost Soul" (迷失灵魂) and "49% of the Soul" (49%的灵魂)

=== City promotion ===
Year	Title	Client	Ref.
2016	Shanghai, City of Innovation	Information Office of Shanghai Municipality	
2017	Hi！静安	Jing'an District Propaganda Department	
2019	上海·恒新之城	Information Office of Shanghai Municipality	

== Discography ==
=== Video games ===
Year	Title	Type	Game	Notes and Ref.
2017	梦回古灵 镇魔遗音 (手机游戏《镇魔曲》原声配乐集)	Album	Demon Seals	Collection of 11 soundtracks
2017	《天涯明月刀》游戏配乐 陈致逸	Album	Moonlight Blade	Collection of works from 2015 to 2017
2017	繁花之年	Single	Moonlight Blade	Moshang Festival (陌上节) theme music; Moonlight Blade second anniversary
2017	八荒之风	Single	Moonlight Blade	The World of Swinging Swords (剑荡八荒) competition theme song
2017	青龙永夜	Single	Moonlight Blade	Azure Dragon Society (青龙会) theme song
2017	道阻且长	Single	Moonlight Blade	Lan Zheng (蓝铮) theme song
2017	沧浪清兮	Single	Moonlight Blade	Canglang Island (沧浪岛) soundtrack
2017	水何澹澹	Single	Moonlight Blade	Canglang Island (沧浪岛) soundtrack
2017	鹿鸣春涧	Single	Moonlight Blade	Linglu Island (灵鹿岛) soundtrack
2017	皎皎萦畔	Single	Moonlight Blade	Linglu Island (灵鹿岛) soundtrack
2017	天衣无缝	Single	Moonlight Blade	Xue Wulei (薛无泪) theme music
2017	风月缠绵	Single	Moonlight Blade	2017 Qixi Festival (七夕节) theme music
2017	末剑 原声大碟	Album	The Last Sword	Co-composed with Yuan Dimeng and Lu Yin
2018	金风玉露·夜语迟	Single	Moonlight Blade	2018 Qixi Festival (七夕节) theme music
2018	梦留别	Single	Moonlight Blade	Yihua (移花) theme song
2019	Saying Sword	Single	Moonlight Blade	Taibai (太白) theme song
2020	The Wind and The Star Traveler	Album	Genshin Impact	Mondstadt soundtrack collection
2020	City of Winds and Idylls	Album	Genshin Impact	Mondstadt Chapter soundtrack
2020	Jade Moon Upon a Sea of Clouds	Album	Genshin Impact	Liyue Chapter soundtrack
2021	相守	Single	The Legend of Sword and Fairy 7	The Legend of Sword and Fairy 7 theme song, sung by Zhou Shen
2021	The Stellar Moments	Album	Genshin Impact	Character soundtrack; co-composed with Yuan Dimeng
2021	Vortex of Legends	Album	Genshin Impact	Dragonspine soundtrack
2021	The Shimmering Voyage	Album	Genshin Impact	Version 1.0 commemorative soundtrack
2021	Realm of Tranquil Eternity	Album	Genshin Impact	Inazuma Chapter soundtrack
2021	仙剑奇侠传七 原声音乐集	Album	The Legend of Sword and Fairy 7	Co-composer
2022	Devastation and Redemption	Single	Genshin Impact	Single later included in Fleeting Colors in Flight
2022	Fleeting Colors in Flight	EP	Genshin Impact	Version 2.4 soundtrack
2022	The Stellar Moments Vol. 2	Album	Genshin Impact	Character soundtrack; co-composer
2022	Islands of the Lost and Forgotten	Album	Genshin Impact	Second Inazuma Chapter soundtrack; co-composer
2022	Millelith's Watch	Album	Genshin Impact	The Chasm soundtrack; co-composer
2022	The Shimmering Voyage Vol. 2	Album	Genshin Impact	Version 2.0 commemorative soundtrack; co-composer
2022	Footprints of the Traveler	Album	Genshin Impact	Version trailer soundtrack; co-composer
2022	Forest of Jnana and Vidya	Album	Genshin Impact	Sumeru Chapter soundtrack; co-composer
2023	The Stellar Moments Vol. 3	Album	Genshin Impact	Character soundtrack; co-composer
2023	The Unfathomable Sand Dunes	Album	Genshin Impact	Second Sumeru Chapter soundtrack; co-composer
2023	Footprints of the Traveler Vol. 2	Album	Genshin Impact	Version trailer soundtrack; co-composer
2023	The Shimmering Voyage Vol. 3	Album	Genshin Impact	Version 3.0 commemorative soundtrack; co-composer
2024	Cantus Aeternus	Album	Genshin Impact	Third Fontaine Chapter soundtrack; co-composer
2024	The Neverending Dream	Concert piece	Project Woolgatherer	Included in the album Project Woolgatherer
2024	A Promise of Dreams	Album	Project Woolgatherer	Composed the tracks "The Neverending Dream," "Dreams Aglow," "To Dream's End," and "So Sleeps the Soul"
2024	The Shimmering Voyage Vol. 4	Album	Genshin Impact	Version 4.0 commemorative soundtrack; co-composer
2024	Footprints of the Traveler Vol. 3	Album	Genshin Impact	Version trailer soundtrack; co-composer
2024	九州飞光	Single	Sword of Justice	Theme song
2024	逆水寒之九光寒林	Album	Sword of Justice	First soundtrack album
2025	逆水寒之新声集	Album	Sword of Justice	Features three tracks, "晨露曦生," "惘然旧忆," and "拂晓初露"
2025	逆水寒之澜海千声	Album	Sword of Justice	Landou (澜都) soundtrack
2025	Radiance Aflame	Album	Genshin Impact	Credited as co-composer in "Bounty of the Fertile Slopes" and "Sprouting of a Gentle Wish" as they reuse older melodies from the game.
2025	Liangzhou Flutes and Drums	Album	Where Winds Meet	Liangzhou (凉州) chapter soundtrack
2025	逆水寒之万屿纪航	Album	Sword of Justice	Composed the tracks 海汇千樯 and 雨落花盈
2026	New Me	Single	Strinova	Cielle character theme
2025	逆水寒之无忧礼赞	Album	Sword of Justice	Nantuo Island (南陀岛) soundtrack
2026	逆水寒之楼兰遗梦	Album	Sword of Justice	Loulan (楼兰) soundtrack
2026	The Shimmering Voyage Vol. 6	Album	Genshin Impact	Co-composer in "Let the Wind Lead," "Unstained Jnanakanda," "Manobuddhyahankara Atmashatkam," "Symphony of Boreal Wind (Variation)," and "Das Favoniuslied (Ensemble)"

=== Collaborations ===
Year	Title	Role	Notes and Ref.
2018	伶仃	Arranger	Collaboration between singers Huo Zun and Zhang Liyin, lyricist Tian Chenming, and producer An Dong
2019	浮生	Composer, arranger	For the physical music album Shanzhi Chuanxing (山止川行) by Bu Cai
2020	花西子	Composer	Collaboration between singer Zhou Shen and cosmetic brand Florasis
2020	故城千寻	Composer, arranger	Collaboration between various artists, including singer Huo Zun and Xu Jiaqi of THE9
2021	泊山城	Composer, producer	Collaboration between Xu Jiaqi of THE9 and lyricist Haodong for Guofengtang, a project by NetEase Cloud Music
2025	Summer Fantasy	Composer, producer	Adapted from "澜间轻步" from Sword of Justice; collaboration with Deutsche Grammophon
2025	The Inn Beneath The Starry Sky	Composer, producer	Adapted from "The Neverending Dream" from Project Woolgatherer; collaboration with Deutsche Grammophon
2025	Fantasyland's Invitation	Composer, producer	Adapted from the 2018 single "Traveler"; included in the Deutsche Grammophon edition of FANTASYLAND
2025	Sound Unbound	Composer, producer	Collaboration with the character Ayn from Lovebrush Chronicles (时空中的绘旅人) for the charity project, "听见世界的每一种可能"
2025	琴语山川 —— 陈致逸游戏音乐钢琴改编作品集①	Composer, producer	Collaboration with Li Jia (arranger), Associate Professor at the Shanghai Conservatory of Music; published by Shanghai Educational Publishing House
2026	Yellow Shore	Composer, producer	Collaboration with Deutsche Grammophon; part of the A Day in Sketches EP
2026	Purple Horizon	Composer, producer	Collaboration with Deutsche Grammophon; part of the A Day in Sketches EP
2026	Overture: The Flavors of Life	Single	Collaboration with Deutsche Grammophon; part of The Poem of Life
2026	Waltz of the Fireflies	Single	Collaboration with Deutsche Grammophon; part of The Poem of Life
2026	Wordless Farewell	Single	Collaboration with Deutsche Grammophon; part of The Poem of Life

=== Personal works ===
Year	Title	Type	Notes and Ref.
2015	心愿	EP	
2017	Time Tunnel	Single	
2017	Midnight Radio	Single	
2017	Dreams Rachmaninoff	Single	
2017	Piano Etudes	EP	
2017	遗忘	Single	Titled "The Forgotten" in Being Towards Death
2018	存在	Single	Titled "Existence" in Being Towards Death
2018	你，不在这里	Single	
2018	向死而生	Single	Titled "Being Towards Death" in album of same the name
2018	旅人	Single	Titled "Traveler" in Being Towards Death
2018	49%的我	Single	Titled "49% Of Me" in Being Towards Death
2018	迷失灵魂	Single	
2018	暗流	Single	Titled "Undercurrent" in Being Towards Death
2018	无疆	Single	
2018	十二神肖	Single	
2018	一杯月	Single	Titled "A Cup of Moon" in Being Towards Death
2018	你是我灵魂的杂质	Demo EP	Published for NetEase Cloud Music's Project Stone (石头计划)
2019	Being Towards Death	Studio album	
2019	Desert Solitary Smoke	Concert piece	First collaboration with a non-Chinese orchestra, the Budapest Scoring Orchestra
2019	The Curse of Blood	Concert piece	Nominated work at the 2019 World Soundtrack Awards
2024	Infinite Cloister of Flowers and Sins	Concert piece	Included in the album FANTASYLAND
2024	Circle Dance of the Evernight Castle	Concert piece	Included in the album FANTASYLAND
2025	FANTASYLAND	Studio album	
2026	海纳百川	Single	Commemorative single marking the first anniversary of FANTASYLAND; nominated for Outstanding Work at the "This is Shanghai" Global Short Film Program

== Awards and nominations ==
Year	Nominated work	Award	Result	Ref.
2013	The Last Tycoon	Hong Kong Film Award for Best Original Film Score	Nominated	
2018	The Last Sword	Global Music Award for Silver Medal – Outstanding Achievement	Won	
2018	The Founding of an Army	Golden Deer Award for Best Original Music Score	Won	
2018	The Taste of Apple	Golden Deer Award for Best Original Music Score	Nominated	
2019	The Curse of Blood	SABAM Award for the Most Original Composition by a Young International Composer	Nominated	
2020	Genshin Impact	BIGC Award for Excellent Game Music of the Year	Won	
2020	Genshin Impact	CGIAC Award for Excellent Game Music	Won	
2020	Genshin Impact	Annual Game Music Award for Outstanding Artist – Newcomer/Breakthrough	Won	
2021	Genshin Impact	PlayStation Game Music Award	Nominated	
2021	Jade Moon Upon a Sea of Clouds	CMIC Music Award for Best Score Soundtrack for Video Game	Won	
2025	Waltz of the Fireflies	7th 4Seasons Musician Competition Award for Chamber Music - First Prize	Won	
2025	Luminous Strides Amidst the Tides	World Artistry Music Award for Film/Game Music - Diamond Prize	Won	
2026	海纳百川	"This is Shanghai" Global Short Film Program - Outstanding Work	Nominated	
