= List of reportedly haunted locations in China =

Locations in China said to be haunted by supernatural entities

This is a list of reportedly haunted locations in China, that are said to be haunted by ghosts or other supernatural beings, including demons. Reports of haunted locations are part of ghostlore, which is a form of folklore. This list also includes those that are located in the special administrative regions of Hong Kong and Macau.

For reportedly haunted locations in the Republic of China (Taiwan), see List of reportedly haunted locations.

== Beijing ==
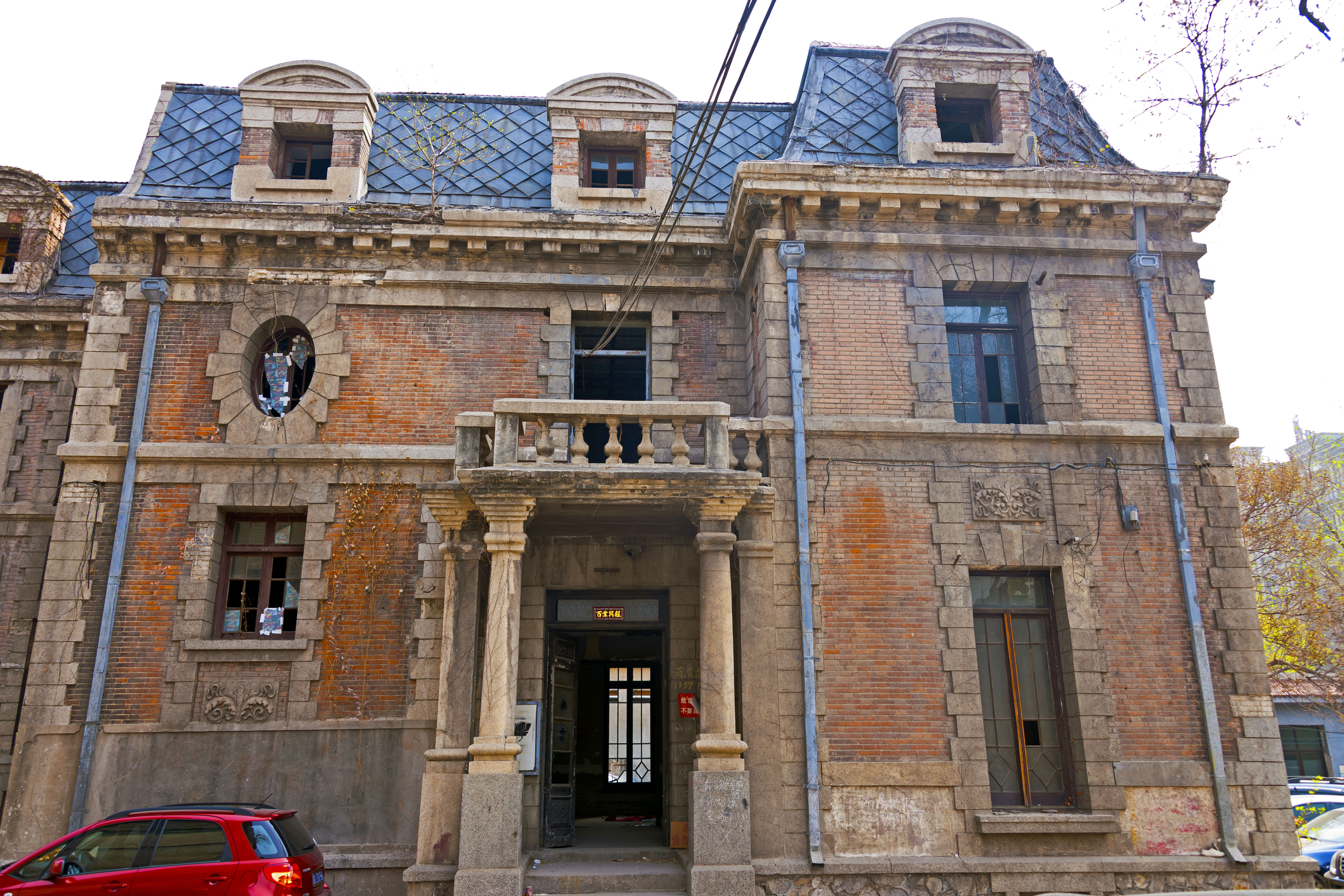
Western (front) elevation of Chaonei No. 81 during 2014.

- The Buma Inn in Beijing.
- Chaonei No. 81, an abandoned mansion in Beijing's Chaoyangmen neighborhood, is claimed by believers to be haunted by the ghost of a crestfallen woman whom her husband or lover, a Kuomintang official, left when the Communist forces were approaching the city. It was the setting for the 2014 Chinese-language horror film The House That Never Dies.
- The Forbidden City, located in the heart of Beijing, is a 100-hectare (250-acre) complex of former imperial palaces to which public entrance was forbidden, except for the members of the imperial family and their servants. Due to its very long history, including countless betrayals, executions, and murders, it is said by believers to be haunted. The management of the imperial complex denies the existence of paranormal activities.
- The Former Residence of Cao Xueqin was where the Qing writer wrote one of the Four Great Classical Novels of the Chinese literature. Like the situation of the family in the novel Dream of the Red Chamber, Cao's family was once important but later purged after the death of the Kangxi Emperor and the ascecion of Yongzheng Emperor to the throne. He eventually moved to this house and wrote the aforementioned novel. Although it is now a wedding photography studio, believing locals claim of hearing spectral sound of traditional instruments at night and accompanied by a woman reciting poetry.
- The Gongwangfu (Prince Gong's Mansion) is a mansion in Xicheng district whose original owner was He Shen, a Qing dynasty official noted for his extreme dishonesty who had 80 concubines. Believers claim it is haunted by the ghost of his wife who died of severe illness due to depression caused by the death of their youngest son in a battle.
- The Great Wall of China is considered by believers to be haunted. The TV series Destination Truth sent an expedition to spend the night investigating these supernatural reports.
- The Huguang Huiguan is located in Beijing's Xuanwu district. Built in 1807 as a home for the poor, it is now a small opera house and museum holding regular performances. Situated on the site of an ancient graveyard, a legend holds that if a stone is thrown into the courtyard, a loud scolding will be heard, but no one will be seen.
- The Tomb of General Yuan, located in the city's Chongwen District, is said by believers to be haunted by the spirit of General Yuan, a loyal supporter of the Ming dynasty who died at emperor's hands after the latter believed in malicious rumors about the general.

== Hebei ==
- The touristic Yun Shan Fan Dian hotel in Chengde, Hebei province is reported to be haunted.

== Henan ==
- Fengmen Village is an abandoned site situated in a remote valley in the county-level city of Qinyang, made up of Qing-style buildings. Believing hikers claim of spectral voices calling their names. A certain wooden armchair in the village is also claimed by believers to be haunted.

== Hong Kong ==
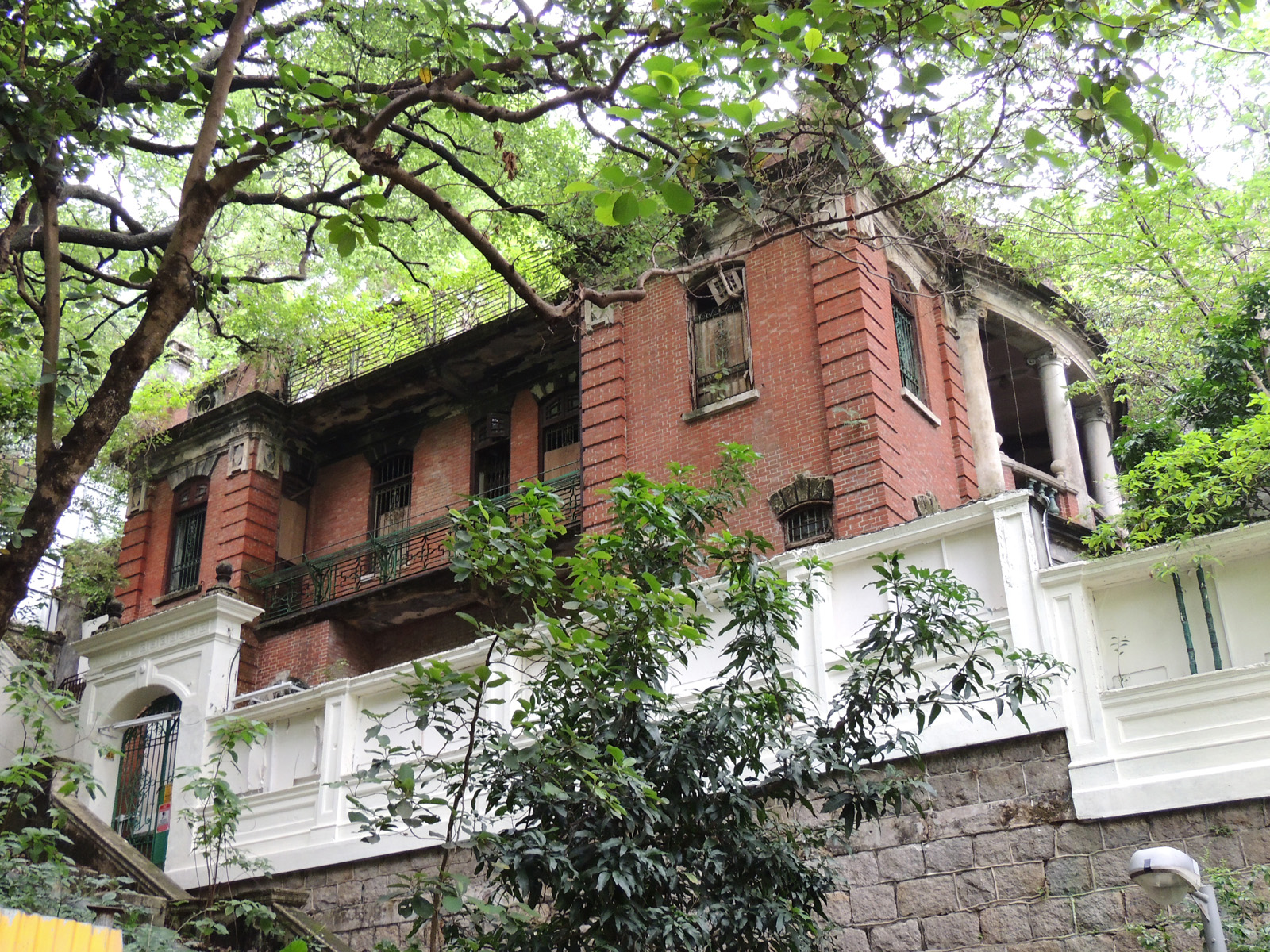
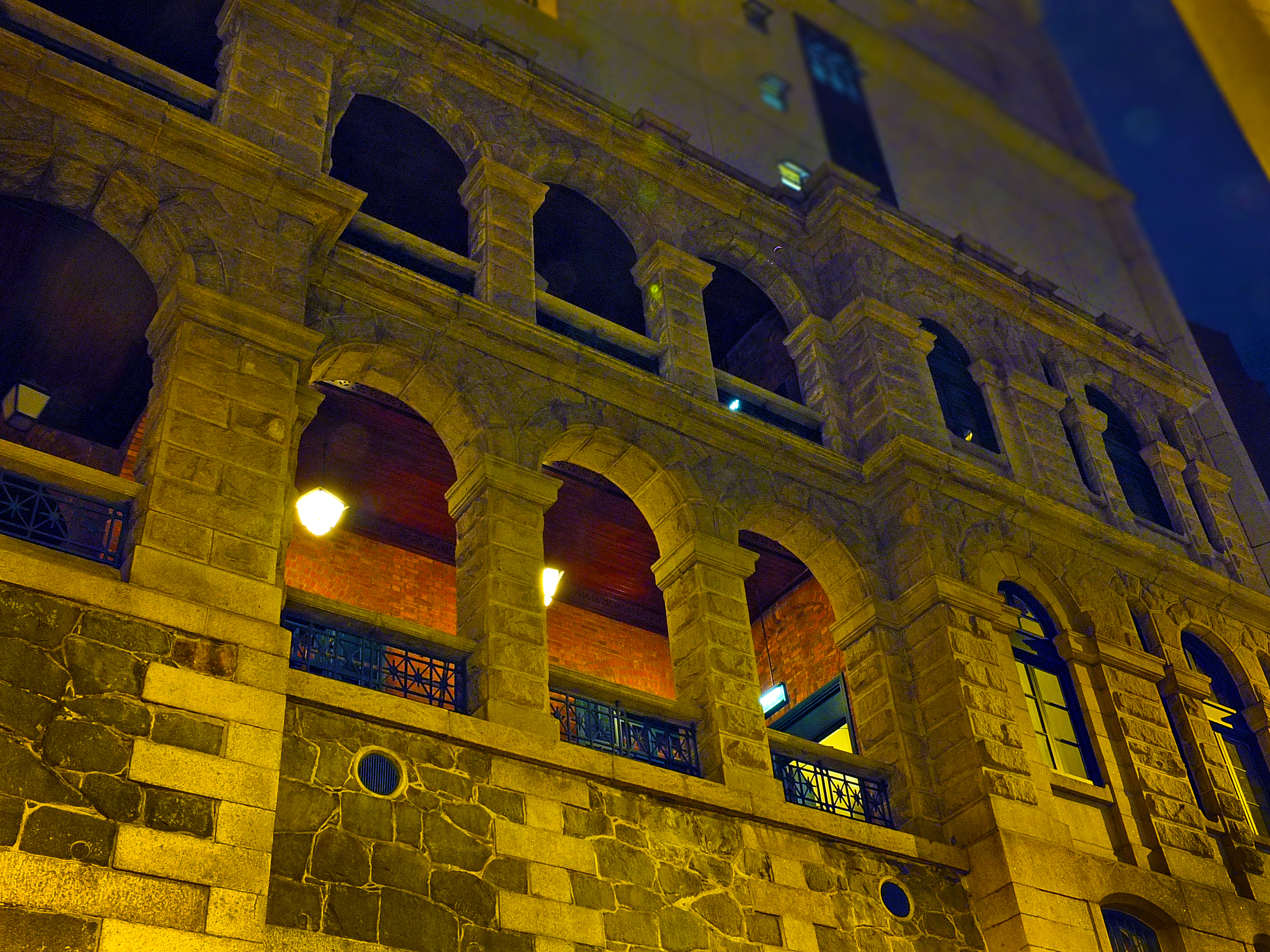
Nam Koo Terrace (left) and Sai Ying Pun Community Complex (right)
- The Hong Kong Museum of Coastal Defence in Shau Kei Wan served as a coastal fort during the Ming and Qing dynasties, as well as during the British rule and the Japanese occupation. Aside from ghosts of those died in battles, believers also claim of a white lady as well as mysterious half-body female ghosts.
- Mong Man Wai Building is the home of the biochemistry department of the Chinese University of Hong Kong. Believing students claim it is haunted, as the second floor formerly served as a morgue.
- Nam Koo Terrace, a historic building in Wan Chai, is said by witnesses to be haunted by female ghosts said to have died in the time the building allegedly served as a Japanese military brothel.
- No. 31 Granville Road, located in Tsim Sha Tsui, the site was once an apartment before it got demolished in 2012 and rebuilt as hotel in 2016. The site was known for the infamous Hello Kitty murder that took place in 1999. For months after the slaying, CCTVs in the area captured a female form lurking in the shops long after closing hours.
- Sai Ying Pun Community Complex, located on High Street in Sai Ying Pun, is said to be haunted due to the fact that it served as a nurses' dormitory before World War II, a place of execution by the Japanese forces during the war, and a mental hospital from the postwar era until the 1970s.
- Tsung Tsai Yuen (Chinese: 松仔園) in Tai Po was once a popular picnic spot, before a deadly landslide in 1955 that killed 28 people. Believers claim the spirits of those perished haunting the area, especially in the vicinity of Mang Gui Kiu Bridge.
- Tuen Mun Road, one of Hong Kong's major expressways, is said by believers to be haunted. Many car accidents have been blamed by locals to the ghosts that suddenly appear along the middle of the expressway. Although authorities have cited narrow carriageways and substandard geometry (to save construction costs) as the reasons for these accidents, speed limits have been enforced for the expressway.
- King George V school: the hall and the pavilion (changing room) are allegedly haunted.
- Tat Tak School in Ping Shan was said to be built on the burial site of hundreds of villagers killed by British and Japanese troops, and where a headmistress died by suicide.
- The Parallel, a pub on Hollywood Road. In early February 2024, a young Thai YouTuber passed by this area with her boyfriend in daytime. She used his iPhone to take a selfie through the pub glass door. The image showed a ghostly pale-faced woman with long hair and a fashionable outfit standing behind in the form of holding onto her shoulder. Although it was noted whether it was someone who passed by that area known as photobomb. But she insists it was just her and her boyfriend at the time.

== Macau ==
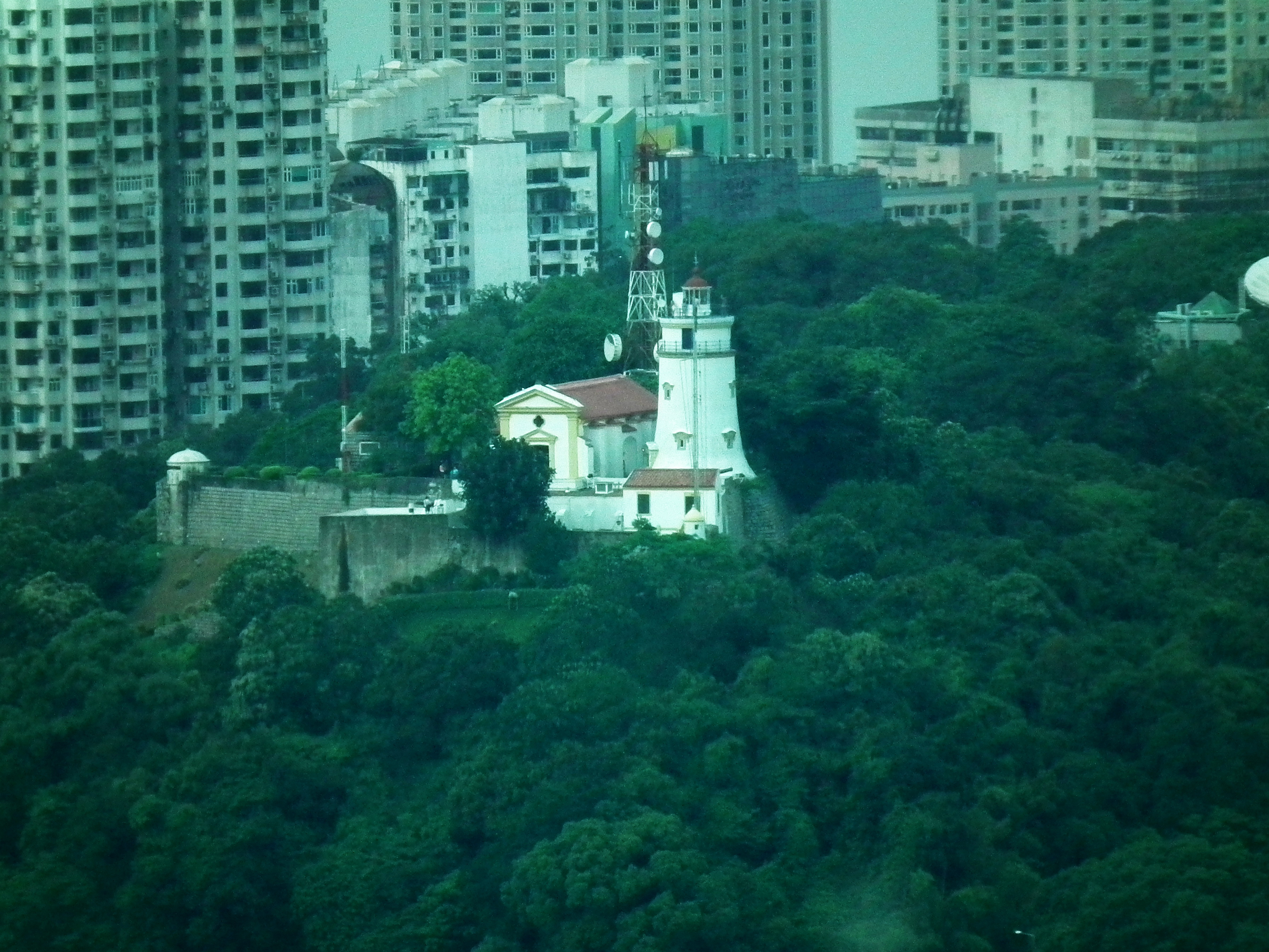
Guia Hill from air. Seen in the middle is the Guia Fortress.

- Calçada do Amparo, an alley located behind the Ruins of St. Paul's, is believed to be haunted by ghosts of overweight people who were killed during the Second Sino-Japanese War, during the period of severe food shortage in Macau.
- Estrada do Repouso is considered by believers to be one of the most haunted roads in the city, as it was the burial place of bones and remains of people from impoverished families during the 19th century.
- Guia Hill is said by believers to be haunted by hungry ghosts targeting joggers at night.
- Tap Sac Square is reputed to be haunted. Planned to be the location of residential complexes after World War II, the buildings were never built because of many accidents and spectral apparitions that unnerved members of the construction team. It is said by believers to be another area containing bones of abandoned bodies.

== Shanghai ==
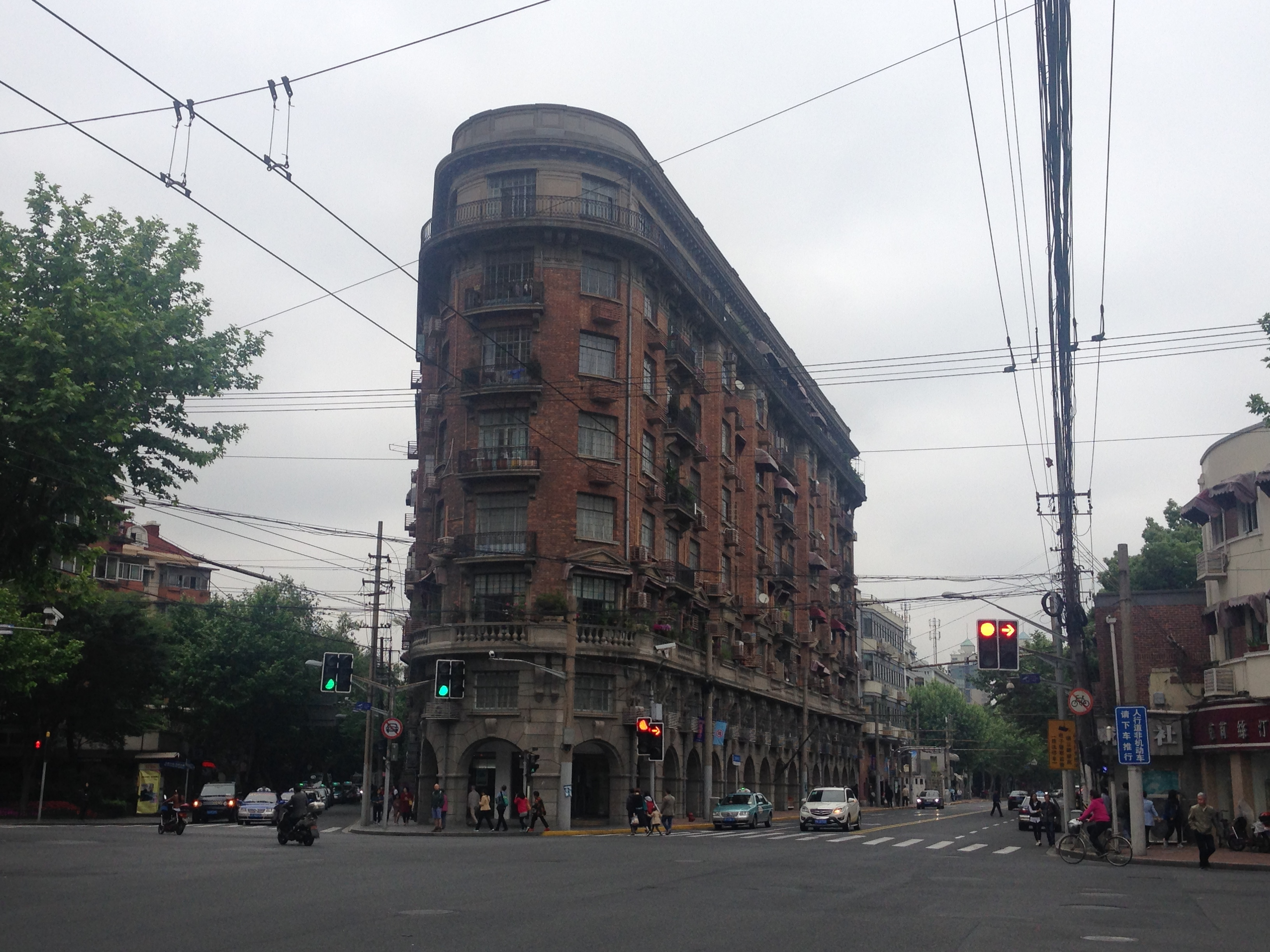
Wukang Mansion

- The Caobao Road Station, a station on Line 1 of the Shanghai Metro, is said by believers to be haunted.
- The Qiu Mansion was built by two brothers who were peasants-turned-millionaires during the beginning of the 20th century. They built two identical mansions and lived in a lavish lifestyle, with a garden around their mansions complete with peacocks, tigers, and crocodiles. During the prime of their life they both mysteriously disappeared. One of the mansions was razed in the 1950s, and to make way for the Shanghai's growing high-rises, the last mansion was to be moved to a new location in 2009. From that point on believing workers have claimed of bizarre animal bites and sightings.
- The Wukang Mansion, formerly known as the Normandie Apartment, in Shanghai, was named after the World War I battleship Normandie, and was designed by the famous Hungarian architect Ladislav Hudec. During the Cultural Revolution of 1966–76, the Red Guards renamed the building Anti-Revisionist Tower, but local residents referred to it as "The Diving Board" because of the dozens of suicides by intellectuals and others who were persecuted as "state enemies". For this reason, believers claim it is haunted by the ghosts of persecuted individuals.

== See also ==
- Ghosts in Chinese culture
- List of reportedly haunted locations
- List of supernatural beings in Chinese folklore
