= Tales of Mystery (film) =

- Film poster
- 怪谈
- Directed by: Raymond Yip; Tian Meng; Xian Xuchu
- Written by: Ding Xiaoyang
- Produced by: Manfred Wong
- Starring: Aarif Rahman; Janice Man; Zhu Zhu; Law Lan; Oscar Leung
- Cinematography: Xu Shaojiang; Chai Ran
- Edited by: Fang Yuan; Yip Yuen-Ting; Zhou Jingjing; Zhou Shentong
- Music by: Chen Zhiyi
- Production companies: Hangzhou Herun Entertainment Co., Ltd; Bona Film Group; Beijing Era Influence Entertainment Co., Ltd; Anhui Jinniu Entertainment Investment Co., Ltd
- Distributed by: Bona Film Group; Beijing Herun Chaofan Film Distribution Co., Ltd
- Release date: 23 January 2015
- Running time: 89 minutes
- Country: China
- Language: Mandarin
- Box office: CN¥1,430,000

Tales of Mystery (Chinese: 怪谈) is a 2015 Chinese suspense thriller film directed by Raymond Yip, Tian Meng and Xian Xuchu. It was released on 23 January 2015.

== Cast ==
- Aarif Rahman as Zi Liang
- Janice Man as Pei Wen
- Zhu Zhu as Xiao Xiao
- Law Lan
- Oscar Leung
- Shi Yanfei as Yue Sisi
- Feng Wenjuan as Zhang Xiaoyun
- Yolanda Yang
- Huang Ming
- Michelle Hu
- Lu Yulai
- Lin Jiangguo

== Reception ==
By January 23, the film had earned CN¥1,430,000 at the Chinese box office.
