= Phantom of the Theatre =

2016 Chinese-Hong Kong film by Raymond Yip

- Film poster
- Chinese: 魔宫魅影
- Hanyu Pinyin: Mó Gōng Mèi Yǐng
- Directed by: Raymond Yip
- Written by: Manfred Wong; Yang Mei Yuan; Li Jing Ling
- Produced by: Manfred Wong; Ruby Lin; Jay Wei; Jeffrey Chan
- Starring: Ruby Lin; Tony Yang; Simon Yam; Huang Lei
- Edited by: Shirley Yip
- Music by: Chen Zhiyi
- Production companies: Polybona Films; Herun Film; Happy Era Media; Dong Yanghong King Film; Beijing and Run Splendour Films
- Distributed by: Bona Film Group; Huaxia Film Distribution; Beijing Herun Chaofan Film Distribution
- Release date: 29 April 2016 (China)
- Running time: 104 minutes
- Countries: China; Hong Kong
- Language: Mandarin
- Box office: US$7.9 million

Phantom of the Theatre (Chinese: 魔宫魅影; pinyin: Mó Gōng Mèi Yǐng) is a 2016 thriller film directed by Raymond Yip, starring Ruby Lin, Tony Yang, Simon Yam, and Huang Lei. A Chinese-Hong Kong co-production, the film depicts a tragic love story set in Shanghai during the 1930s. It was released in China on 29 April 2016.

== Premise ==
The story is set in Shanghai during the 1930s.

A haunted theatre, filled with the vengeful spirits of a tragically trapped performance troupe murdered in a fire 13 years ago, waits for the once-grand palatial playhouse to re-open with a new show and bring in new victims. Phantom of the Theatre depicts a tragic love story between rising film star Meng Sifan and young director Gu Weibang, the son of the warlord Gu Mingshan.

== Cast ==
- Ruby Lin as Meng Sifan (孟思凡) / Kong Lan (孔蘭) / Kong Jin (孔金)
  - Zhang Zifeng as young Kong Lan
- Yang "Tony" Youning as Gu Weibang (顧偉邦)
- Yam "Simon" Tat-wah as Gu Mingshan (顧鳴山)
- Jing Gangshan as Kong Shen (孔申)
- Huang Huan as Fei Lisi (費麗斯)
- Lin Jiangguo as Tang Shirao (湯世饒)
- Hu Ming as The Adjutant
- Meng "Natalie" Yao as Pan Ruyu (潘如玉)
- Wu Xudong as Liu Kang (陸康)
- Ha "Patricia" Manjing as Weibang's mother
- Han Zhi as The Butler
- Li Xiaochuan as Ma Rulong (馬如龍)
- Huang Lei as The Theatre Owner
- Luo Tianjiao as Xiao Mei (小美)
- Du Changrui as Actress
- Li Jiaxuan as Actress
- Li Ching as Master of Ceremony
- He Yunwei as Master of Ceremony
- Li Yang as The Thief

== Production ==
The film cast is led by Ruby Lin, Raymond Yip, and Manfred Wong, their third collaboration on horror films. Phantom of the Theatre was filmed in Shanghai, where shooting of the film started on 13 January 2015 and was wrapped up on 3 March 2015.

== Release ==
The film was moved from its scheduled release date of 27 November 2015, to 28 April 2016. It was released in China on 29 April 2016. It was released on DVD by Well Go USA Entertainment on 11 October 2016.

Country	Released date	Alternative title
China	29 April 2016	魔宫魅影 (mó gōng mèi yǐng)
United States (Limited)	6 May 2016	Phantom of the Theatre
Canada (Limited)	6 May 2016	Phantom of the Theatre
Vietnam	13 May 2016	Bóng Ma Nhà Hát
Taiwan	13 May 2016	魔宫魅影 (mó gōng mèi yǐng)

== Reception ==
The film grossed US$7.85 million on its opening weekend in China.

== Soundtrack ==
The Phantom of Theatre (Original Motion Picture Soundtrack)

Soundtrack album by Chen Zhiyi
- Released: May 13, 2016
- Studio: Click Music
- Genre: Film score
- Length: 1:17:00
- Language: Mandarin
- Producers: Bona Film Group; Hangzhou Herun Film; Dongyang Hongjing Film & TV Culture

Chen Zhiyi chronology
铠甲勇士—帝皇侠 电影原声 (2016)	The Phantom of Theatre (Original Motion Picture Soundtrack) (2016)	往日时光 (2016)

Track listing
No.	Title	English title	Length
1.	"迷雾" (feat. A-Lin)	"The Mist"	05:35
2.	"偷窃者"	"The Thief"	01:13
3.	"心鬼"	"The Devil Inside"	01:06
4.	"宿命 (Intro)"	"Destiny (Intro)"	01:13
5.	"解剖"	"Anatomy"	01:39
6.	"背后"	"At the Back"	00:12
7.	"不怀好意"	"Cankered"	01:09
8.	"心动"	"Heartbeat"	00:45
9.	"梦魇"	"Nightmare"	00:50
10.	"魔宫剧院"	"The Phantom Theatre"	02:23
11.	"角色"	"The Character"	00:30
12.	"电影开机"	"Action!"	01:12
13.	"偷情"	"Love Affair"	01:27
14.	"窥"	"Peep"	00:30
15.	"邂逅"	"Meet Unexpectly"	01:03
16.	"死神的诅咒"	"A Curse by Death"	02:35
17.	"暧昧"	"Ambiguous"	01:17
18.	"性侵犯"	"Sexual Assault"	02:59
19.	"扭曲"	"Distorted"	01:41
20.	"惊惶而逃"	"Escape"	01:49
21.	"魂飞魄散"	"Destruction"	00:41
22.	"魔镜"	"The Mirror"	01:45
23.	"调查"	"Investigate"	00:49
24.	"朦胧的爱意"	"Hazy Love"	02:06
25.	"缠绵"	"Whispers of Love"	01:26
26.	"突变"	"Mutation"	00:20
27.	"一场电影一场梦"	"One Movie, One Dream"	02:16
28.	"面容"	"The Face"	00:46
29.	"想念"	"Miss"	00:55
30.	"死神的呼唤"	"Call From Death"	01:14
31.	"触不到的爱恋"	"Untouchable Love"	03:51
32.	"蓄谋"	"Premeditate"	00:26
33.	"欺骗"	"Deceive"	02:15
34.	"失恋"	"Crossed In Love"	01:18
35.	"一探究竟"	"Exploration"	02:12
36.	"绑架"	"Kidnapping"	01:26
37.	"戏班进城"	"Coming to the Town"	01:08
38.	"丽宫剧院"	"Ligong Theatre"	01:49
39.	"旋转的舞"	"The Show"	02:07
40.	"灾变"	"The Disaster"	02:10
41.	"电影落幕"	"Drop Scene"	01:11
42.	"揭穿"	"Expose"	02:40
43.	"人质"	"Hostage"	01:20
44.	"背叛与救赎"	"Betrayal and Redemption"	02:00
45.	"破灭 (Outro)"	"Shatter (Outro)"	02:18
46.	"离别"	"Farewell"	01:01
47.	"迷雾" (feat. 朱梓溶 & Eric Juu)	"Dense Fog"	05:06
Total length:			01:17:00

- Solo vocalist (female): Zhu Zirong
- Solo vocalist (male): Chen Zhiyi (Yu Peng)
- Violin solo: Piao Ying, Zhang Suchen
- Cello solo: Chen Xiaolong
- Flute: Chen Kun
- Oboe: Zhang Xin
- Bassoon: Hu Yu
- Horn: Guo Zhanbao, Shi Jieliang
- Trombone: Liu Zhanyi
- Tuba: Mou Xianquan
- Chinese flute: Tu Huabing
- Pipa: Xie Yudan
- Erhu: Lu Yiwen
- Choir: Zhu Zhirong, Chen Qin, Fu Xiaoli, Wu Jing, Wang Guofang, Jiang Bin, Zhang Chaojun, Guo Junyu, Chen Zhiyi (Yu Peng)
- Strings: Shanghai Piao Ying Chamber Music Group
- Recording studio: Shanghai San You Recording Occupation Studio
- Recording engineer: Lu Xiaoxing
- Mixing engineer: Chen Zhiyi (Yu Peng)
- Music producer: Anders Lee
