= The House That Never Dies =

- Film poster
- Directed by: Raymond Yip
- Written by: Manfred Wong
- Produced by: Manfred Wong
- Starring: Francis Ng; Ruby Lin; Monica Mok; Tony Yang; Qin Hailu
- Cinematography: Xu Xiao Giang
- Edited by: Li Gia Rong
- Music by: Chen Zhiyi
- Production companies: Heng Ye Film Distribution Co., Ltd; China Film Group; Co-production: Shanghai Creasun Media; Chong Qing Film Group; Shanghai Media Group (SMG); Perfect Sky Pictures; TIK Films; China Film Co., LTD Beijing Film Distribution Branch
- Distributed by: China Film Group
- Release date: July 18, 2014
- Running time: 90 min
- Country: China
- Language: Mandarin
- Budget: 100 million yuan (US$16,000,000)
- Box office: 407 million yuan

The House That Never Dies (simplified Chinese: 京城81号; traditional Chinese: 京城81號; pinyin: Jing Cheng 81 Hao) is a 2014 Chinese 3D thriller film directed by Raymond Yip. The story is based on that of a purportedly haunted mansion, Chaonei No. 81, which is located on No. 81 Chaoyangmen Inner Street in Beijing, China.

The Chaonei No. 81 was a three-story French Baroque-style house which was built in the 1800s by Qing officials. Legend says that the house became haunted after the end of the Chinese Communist Revolution in 1949, when the wife of a Kuomintang official who once lived there committed suicide. It is believed that her spirit still haunts the house.

== Plot ==
The 3D thriller is based on the legendary mansion at No. 81 on Chaoyangmennei Street in Beijing, follows Xu Ruoqing (Ruby Lin), a woman whose presence in the notorious mansion draws up the spirits that have taken residence there. She has recently moved in with their daughter to the mansion with Zhao Yitang (Francis Ng), the boss of a publication company publishing Xu Ruoqing's novels.

The film starts with the story of a notable family who lives in the house right after the fall of the Qing Dynasty (1644-1911). When the family's third son, Huo Lianqi (Tony Yang) falls in love with a prostitute named Lu Dieyu (also Lin), his request to marry her is refused and instead the family force Lu to marry their second recently deceased son in a posthumous wedding ceremony. Going from the wedding directly to the funeral, the family throws Lu Dieyu into a coffin with the pale-faced dead body of her new husband.

After being locked in the coffin with her newly-wed and deceased husband, Huo Lianqi rushes back to the house upon hearing of the news that she was married to his second brother. He released her from the coffin and they got married on the spot in front of the coffin and consummated their marriage in the same room unbeknownst to the family. The day after, Lu Dieyu woke up only to find Huo Lianqi gone.

The scene flashes back to the present, Xu Ruoqing started having visions around the mansion, and this condition grew worse with each passing day in the mansion. Her daughter has come to her several nights claiming that a young girl dressed in red kept wanting to play with her. Horrified, Xu Ruoqing started asking for Zhao Yitang to come back to accompany her and their daughter for the nights, only to have him rejecting her requests as his company are currently facing funding issues and usually spent the nights with his assistant, Liu Li (Monica Mok) to source out potential investors. Incidentally, Liu Li is also Xu Ruoqing's best friend who was the one who brought the two of them together. Liu Li has pointed out in a conversation that Zhao Yitang was actually still in a marriage with his wife and the divorce papers have not been signed by his wife (Patricia Ha), contrary to what Xu Ruoqing thought.

Getting increasingly disturbed by the visions around the mansion, with Zhao Yitang's absence around the house at night, Xu Ruoqing started getting suspicious that Zhao Yitang might actually be having an affair with Liu Li.

The scene cuts back to the past, where Lu Dieyu was shown to be pregnant with Huo Lianqi's child on the night of their consummation. Despite being married to the deceased second son of the family, the family thought that it is strange that she is pregnant as the physician deduced that the child was supposedly conceived on the night of marriage. The eldest son, Huo Lianxiu (also Francis) however, allowed for her to kept her child. Lu Dieyu was then moved to the basement of the mansion to await her pregnancy. Lu Dieyu was seen to be continuously writing letters back-and-forth to Huo Lianqi, even after her daughter was born, she continued writing and receiving letters from Huo Lianqi but he was not seen to have returned to the mansion, writing in one of his letters that he's studying abroad and will return once he's graduated.

Back at the present, Xu Ruoqing confronted Liu Li on whether she is having an affair with Zhao Yitang, to which she rejected and explained that Zhao Yitang's company is having a lot of financial issues and she is only maintaining a strict workers relationship with Zhao Yitang. Feeling a mix of emotions of guilt, fear and insecurity, Xu Ruoqing turned to her old friend, who is also a psychologist (Qin Hailu) for consultation on her current situation.

Her visions in the house did not go away, her daughter came to her one night to ask her for help in catching a red butterfly, where she was led to the basement of the mansion where Lu Dieyu stayed during her pregnancy. In there, she found a box of letters and photos, and realised that she looked identical to the Lu Dieyu in the photos.

Having found a surviving servant from the Huo's family in the mansion, Gen, told Xu Ruoqing about the tragedy of the Huo family that unfolds. Huo Lianxiu's wife (also Patricia Ha) suspected that Huo Lianxiu is gradually being attracted to Lu Dieyu, and under the persuasion of her brother and cousin, agreed to letting them put in Marijuana into Lu Dieyu's herbal medicine and letting her consume it, making Lu Dieyu seems 'crazier' which will hopefully make her husband less interested in her. On the other hand, Huo Lianxiu went to the basement to find Lu Dieyu with Huo Lianqi's death certificate, telling her that Huo Lianqi has died long ago, and the person who has been writing letters to her was him all along. Huo Lianxiu has fallen in love with her since and wanted to bring her with him to leave the family, Lu Dieyu rejected and pushed him out, unable to believe that Huo Lianqi has been dead all along. Unable to cope with Huo Lianqi's death, Lu Dieyu killed herself in the basement while wearing her red wedding dress. Huo Lianxiu learnt of her suicide and wanted to join her in death, stopping when he saw her daughter by Lu Dieyu's body. On the 7th day of Lu Dieyu's funeral, everybody in the mansion died, including Huo Lianxiu's wife, her brother and cousin. Huo Lianxiu decided to raise her daughter as his own and left the mansion.

In the present, Zhao Yitang has been called by his wife where he was given the option of having a cheque with a huge funds to save his career, only if he agrees to tear up the divorce papers. Zhao Yitang refused, and finally his wife revealed that it's too late for him to do anything now. She has been bribing Gen, agreeing to let him inherit the mansion, on the condition that he changes Xu Ruoqing's medicines with another chemical substance that will cause Xu Ruoqing to hallucinate and these hallucinations might eventually kill her. Meanwhile, Xu Ruoqing are escaping from all the servants who have died in the mansion, and flee with her daughter to the basement of the mansion, managing to find some peace over there. The little girl in red whom her daughter claimed to have encountered previously appeared, revealing that she's actually the daughter of Zhao Yitang and his wife and had been instructed by the wife to dress in red all the time in the mansion and her daddy will come back to her.

Zhao Yitang rushed back to the mansion, finally reuniting with Xu Ruoqing and both his daughters in the basement. Upon returning to the main area of the mansion, Gen pushed out a wheelchair and explained that Huo Lianqi has returned after the tragedy only to find the house empty. Huo Lianqi had been waiting at the house for the return of Xu Ruoqing, and Gen wanted the mansion for him and Huo Lianqi as he believes Huo Lianqi is the rightful owner of the mansion. Gen turned the wheelchair around, only to reveal the decomposed body of Huo Lianqi, and chased Zhao Yitang's family out of the mansion. The movie ended as the decomposed body slowly turned into dust as Xu Ruoqing left the mansion.

== Cast ==
- Francis Ng
- Ruby Lin
- Tony Yang
- Monica Mok
- Qin Hailu
- Li Jing
- Pat Ha
- Elaine Jin
- Yuen Cheung-yan
- Li Xiaochuan
- Han Zhi

== Production ==
To enhance the horror effects, the producers decided to make it a true 3D thriller by using 3D cameras exclusively throughout the film. The director Raymond Yip also paid attention to the layout of the house as it was during imperial times. The pre-production preparations for The House That Never Dies took three years, whilst production for the film took one year. The filming crew visited Chaonei No. 81 and collected over 3,000 pages of data. Raymond Yip invited Lau Sai-Wa as art director, and Stanley Cheung as costume designer.

Most of the scenes of the film were shot in Beijing and Wuxi, a city in southeast China's Jiangsu province.

13 May 2014, Chinese title Chao Nei 81 Hao (朝內81號) was renamed Jing Cheng 81 Hao (京城81號).

== Soundtrack ==
京城81号 (电影原声带)

Soundtrack album by Chen Zhiyi
- Released: July 15, 2014
- Studio: Click Music
- Genre: Film score
- Length: 1:10:00
- Language: Mandarin
- Producers: Shanghai Leyi Culture & Communication Co., Ltd.

Chen Zhiyi chronology
| 铠甲勇士 (2009) | 京城81号 (电影原声带) (2014) | 心愿 (2014) |

Track listing
| No. | Title | Length |
|---|---|---|
| 1. | "序曲" | 02:23 |
| 2. | "81号主题" | 00:37 |
| 3. | "外婆的家" | 00:48 |
| 4. | "一切会更好" | 00:47 |
| 5. | "81号的传闻" | 00:46 |
| 6. | "第一夜" | 02:03 |
| 7. | "工作" | 00:34 |
| 8. | "沉醉" (feat. 朱梓溶 Angelina) | 02:38 |
| 9. | "霍家祖业" | 02:49 |
| 10. | "争执" | 01:47 |
| 11. | "玩伴" | 03:04 |
| 12. | "迎亲" | 02:55 |
| 13. | "凌辱" | 03:12 |
| 14. | "缠绵时刻" | 01:47 |
| 15. | "梦魇时分" | 02:18 |
| 16. | "81号的传说" | 00:45 |
| 17. | "疑心病" | 02:04 |
| 18. | "蝴蝶的指引" | 01:34 |
| 19. | "神秘的信笺" | 01:30 |
| 20. | "意外身孕" | 00:48 |
| 21. | "漫長的等待" | 02:04 |
| 22. | "思念" | 01:04 |
| 23. | "事與願違" | 01:34 |
| 24. | "鏡中的自己" | 01:20 |
| 25. | "心神不寧" | 01:09 |
| 26. | "心魔" | 01:10 |
| 27. | "友情破裂" | 02:25 |
| 28. | "時空交錯" | 02:43 |
| 29. | "真相?" | 00:30 |
| 30. | "真相大白" | 02:53 |
| 31. | "意外的表白" | 01:32 |
| 32. | "不歸路" | 02:23 |
| 33. | "凋零 (插曲)" (feat. 朱梓溶 Angelina) | 02:29 |
| 34. | "頭七還魂" | 04:06 |
| 35. | "無盡的恐懼" | 02:53 |
| 36. | "致命逃脫" | 02:00 |
| 37. | "終結" | 01:50 |
| 38. | "凋零 (主題曲)" (feat. 朱梓溶 Angelina) | 02:01 |
| Total length: | | 01:10:00 |

== Reception ==
=== Response ===
Along with good word of mouth and high box office, media outlets described the film as having "changed people's impression that Chinese thriller films were boring".

The film has struck a chord with Chinese audiences but not just for the 3D thrills and chills. The film has inspired hordes of Beijingers to make the trek to Chaoyangmen Inner Street in the city's downtown area where the notorious Chanonei No. 81 building stands reports The New York Times. Following the film's release, up to 500 people per day were visiting the dilapidated and abandoned three-story town house built in 1910 as a Chinese language school for foreign missionaries. The building's owners, the Beijing Catholic Diocese, had to keep the gates closed to deal with the crowds, only letting in a few visitors at any one time.

=== Box office ===
In mainland China, The House That Never Dies earned $25 million in three days, clocking up 81,360 screenings and 4.37 million admissions. It broke the opening-day box office record for a Chinese language horror film, also it is already the highest grossing Chinese horror film of all time. The film initially accounted for only approximately 15.5% of all screenings on the Friday July 25, 2014, earning RMB45 million (US$7.07 million) from 1.29 million admissions (including early screenings). Cinemas quickly added screenings over the weekend and, by the following Sunday, July 27, 2014, it represented approximately 26.6% of all screenings. The film clung on to second spot and added $27.5 million over the second weekend to give a 10-day cume of $53.7 million (RMB324 million), with 175,497 screenings and 4.8 million admissions. It earned a total of US$64.3 million.

== Ratings system ==
China has no film ratings system, but there are growing calls for a national setup to protect minors. In the absence of a film classification system in China, a cinema in Xinjiang province has taken the bold step of introducing its own in-house ratings scheme to shield children from inappropriate movies after their childish cries of fear disturbed other cinema-goers. Since August 3, the Urumqi branch of the China Film theater chain has started rating movies shown on its six screens, including "G" (all ages admitted) or "PG-13" (parents strongly cautioned; some material may be inappropriate for children under 13). While censorship for political reasons makes the headlines, the Film Bureau also makes cuts to, or bans outright, films that are unsuitable for children.

The policy has been applied after a number of younger viewers were driven to tears of terror by Raymond Yip's The House That Never Dies. The wailing children disturbed other viewers, the theater owner told local media. The six screen complex, part of state-owned China Film Group’s nationwide circuit, recently issued a ‘PG-13’ advisory to The House That Never Dies.

== See also ==
- Chaoyangmen
