= Armor Hero Captor King =

- Poster
- Chinese: 铠甲勇士捕王
- Directed by: Zheng Guowei; Young Kyun Park
- Written by: Seonhwa Geum
- Based on: Stone Comics Entertainment character
- Produced by: Lee Tae-hun; Park Chan-wook; Andy Yoon
- Cinematography: Kyung-pyo Hong
- Edited by: Jaewoong Choi
- Music by: Jae-hak Lee
- Production companies: Alpha Pictures (Shanghai); Guangzhou Alpha Media; Tianjin Huayi Brothers Blockbuster Films; Shanghai Yongxu Media; Shanghai Tianlai Entertainment (Beijing); CJ Entertainment; Stone Comics Entertainment; MoonWatcher; Union Investment Partners; Netmarble
- Distributed by: Tianjin Huayi Brothers Blockbuster Films; Alpha Pictures (Shanghai); Dongyang Tiantian Shangying Pictures; CJ Entertainment
- Release date: 2 October 2016
- Running time: 86 minutes
- Countries: China; South Korea
- Languages: Mandarin; Korean
- Box office: CN¥18.6 million

Armor Hero Captor King, also known as Armor Hero Buwang, is a 2016 Korean-Chinese action fantasy adventure film directed by Zheng Guowei. It was released in China on October 2, 2016.

== Plot ==
The King Catcher is the ultimate armor that is a combination of the leader of the Ares Beast Army, Marshal Qilin, and the Earth's future technological Catcher Armor. The armor developed in 2072 is called the Beast Catcher King Armor. The four generals under his command (Emperor Lion, Royal Bee, Sky Bat, and King Shark) are responsible for arresting lonely ghosts who hurt and kill people. The War Marshal enforces the law with great power, and the mighty Qilin descends to protect the world and defend justice in the world.

== Cast ==
- Lại Nghệ
- Wang Changchang
- Qu Haojun
- Yu Xiaoling
- Dai Xinlong
- Liu Lijia
- Jia Ru
- Zhang Ziye
- Wang Yongfeng
- Wang Pengxuan

== Reception ==
The film grossed CN¥18.6 million at the Chinese box office.
