= Raymond Yip =

Hong Kong film director

- Chinese: 葉偉民
- Other names: Yip Wai-man, Wai-man Yip
- Occupation: Film director

Raymond Yip Wai-man (葉偉民) is a film director from Hong Kong.

== Filmography ==
=== Films ===
- 1993 The Kung Fu Cult Master - Assistant director.
- 1995 Sixty Million Dollar Man - Screenwriter, Director.
- 1998 Portland Street Blues - Director.
- 2000 For Bad Boys Only
- 2000 Those Were the Days...
- 2002 Beauty and the Breast
- 2003 Anna in Kungfuland
- 2010 Bruce Lee, My Brother
- 2010 Lost on Journey
- 2012 Blood Stained Shoes
- 2014 The House That Never Dies
- 2015 Tales of Mystery
- 2016 Phantom of the Theatre
- 2017 Cook Up a Storm
