= Minefields (song) =

2020 single by Faouzia and John Legend

- Official standard cover art

Single by Faouzia and John Legend

from the EP Citizens
- Released: November 5, 2020
- Recorded: 2020
- Genre: Pop
- Length: 3:11
- Label: Atlantic Records; Artist Partner Group
- Composers: Charlie Puth; Sam Martin; Jeff Halatrax; J-kash
- Lyricists: Faouzia; Ali Tamposi
- Producer: Johnny Goldstein

Faouzia singles chronology
| "How It All Works Out (Stripped)" (2020) | "Minefields" (2020) | "Don't Tell Me I'm Pretty" (2021) |

John Legend singles chronology
| "Wild" (2020) | "Minefields" (2020) | "Hallelujah" (2020) |

Alternative cover
- Alternative cover art, also available in different color variants for each remix.

Music video
- "Minefields" on YouTube

"Minefields" is a song recorded by Moroccan-Canadian singer-songwriter Faouzia and American singer-songwriter John Legend, released on October 29, 2020, by Atlantic Records and Artist Partner Group as a digital single. The song's lyrics were written by Faouzia and Ali Tamposi, while the musical composition was done by Charlie Puth, Sam Martin, Jeff Halatrax, and J-kash and production by Johnny Goldstein. The official music video premiered on January 28, 2021, via the official YouTube channel of Faouzia.

== Music and lyrics ==
The sentimental ballad song was structured in the key of C♯ minor and splendidly showcased Faouzia's upper belting range and Legend's baritone vocals. Faouzia's vocal range in the song spans from C#3 to G#5, three octaves sung interchangeably in chest and mixed registers. The lyrics expressed the grief of two lovers after parting ways and the need to come back as to what initially was. They have to walk through minefields to get to each other and as minefields were planted with explosive mines, they have to endeavour on the deadly odyssey as one tiny mistake of stepping on a mine would prompt their immediate death. Faouzia talked about the song and said:

"Minefields is about the real human struggles that we all go through to be with our loved ones. With how challenging the last year has been for everyone, my hope is that this song and video can act as a beacon, a reminder, that we can and will persevere – it's in our nature".

== Music video ==
The official music video was officially released on January 28, 2021, via the official YouTube channel of Faouzia. Directed by Emmy-award winner Kyle Cogan, he captured Faouzia and Legend performing the duet in a minefield. According to Faouzia, she met Legend for the first time at the set of the music video, having worked on the song together remotely. She said working together with Legend was an "incredible experience".

Faouzia dedicated the music video to Ryan Brady, Atlantic Records' vice president of marketing, who was killed in a car accident at age 34, in Los Angeles in December 2020. She stated, "Sadly, we lost my dear friend and important part of that team, Ryan Brady, at the end of 2020. This video is dedicated to his memory and the joy he brought to so many of us".

== Track listing ==
- Digital download and streaming
1. "Minefields" – 3:10
- Digital download and streaming – live acoustic
1. "Minefields" (live acoustic) – 3:13
- Digital download and streaming – Ofenbach remix
1. "Minefields" (Ofenbach remix) – 3:49
- Digital download and streaming – Hook n Sling remix
1. "Minefields" (Hook n Sling remix) – 3:02

== Charts ==
The song peaked at number 45 on Canadian Billboard Digital Chart, at number 43 on French SNEP singles chart, and on the Ultratip in French Belgian market peaking at number 44 in the bubbling under chart.

== Credits and personnel ==
Credits adapted from Tidal.

- Faouzia Ouhiya – vocals and writer
- John Legend - vocals
- Johnny Goldstein – producer, programmer and writer
- Tim McClain – engineer
- Chris Galland – mixing engineer
- Jeremie Inhaber – assistant mixing engineer
- Robin Florent – assistant mixing engineer
- Scott Desmarais – assistant mixing engineer
- Emerson Mancini – masterer
- Manny Marroquin – mixer
- Ali Tamposi – writer
- Charlie Puth – writer
- Sam Martin – writer
- Jeff Halatrax – writer
- J-kash – writer

== Certifications ==
Certifications for "Minefields"
| Region | Certification | Certified units/sales |
|---|---|---|
| France (SNEP) | Diamond | 333,333^{‡} |
| Poland (ZPAV) | Gold | 25,000^{‡} |
^{‡} Sales+streaming figures based on certification alone.
