= Glasperlenspiel (duo) =

German electropop duo

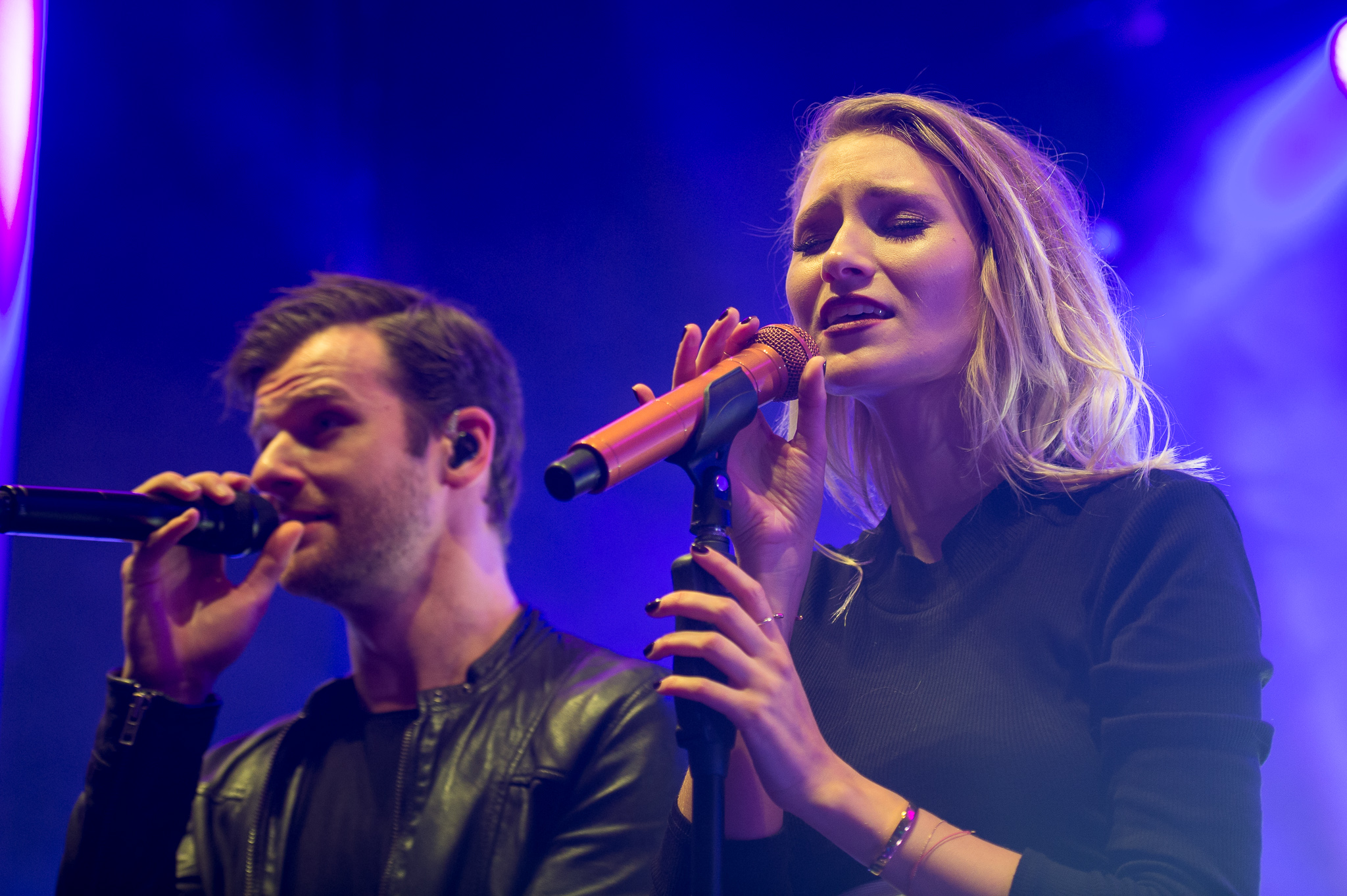
- Glasperlenspiel performing in 2016

Background information
- Origin: Stockach, Germany
- Genres: Electropop; synth-pop
- Years active: 2003–present
- Label: Polydor
- Members: Carolin Niemczyk; Daniel Grunenberg

Glasperlenspiel is a German electropop duo from Stockach, consisting of vocalist Carolin Niemczyk, and keyboardist Daniel Grunenberg.

== History ==
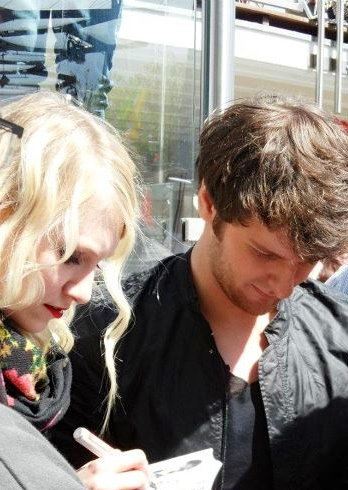
Glasperlenspiel in 2012

Carolin Niemczyk and Daniel Grunenberg were previously members of the Stockach-based band Crazy Flowers. The two later formed the duo Glasperlenspiel, and named themselves after the novel of the same name. They first came to public attention in Germany for competing in the Bundesvision Song Contest 2011, representing Baden-Württemberg with the song "Echt". They placed fourth and their song went on to become a top ten hit in Germany. Their debut studio album Beweg dich mit mir was released in September 2011, and was certified gold in Germany.

In 2013, they released the single "Nie vergessen" which became their second top ten hit in their home country. Their second studio album Grenzenlos was released in May 2013, and was later rereleased as Grenzenlos in diesem Moment. In 2015, they participated in the Bundesvision Song Contest 2015, representing Baden-Württemberg again with the song "Geiles Leben". They placed sixth in the final, and the song went on to peak at number-two in Germany and Austria, and number-one in Switzerland. Their third studio album Tag X was later released in May 2015. In 2018, Niemczyk became a judge on the fifteenth season of Deutschland sucht den Superstar. Owing likely to Niemczyk's Polish heritage, the duo represented Poland at the Free European Song Contest 2020 (organized, like Bundesvision, by ProSieben) with the song "Immer da," which finished eleventh.

== Members ==
Glasperlenspiel members

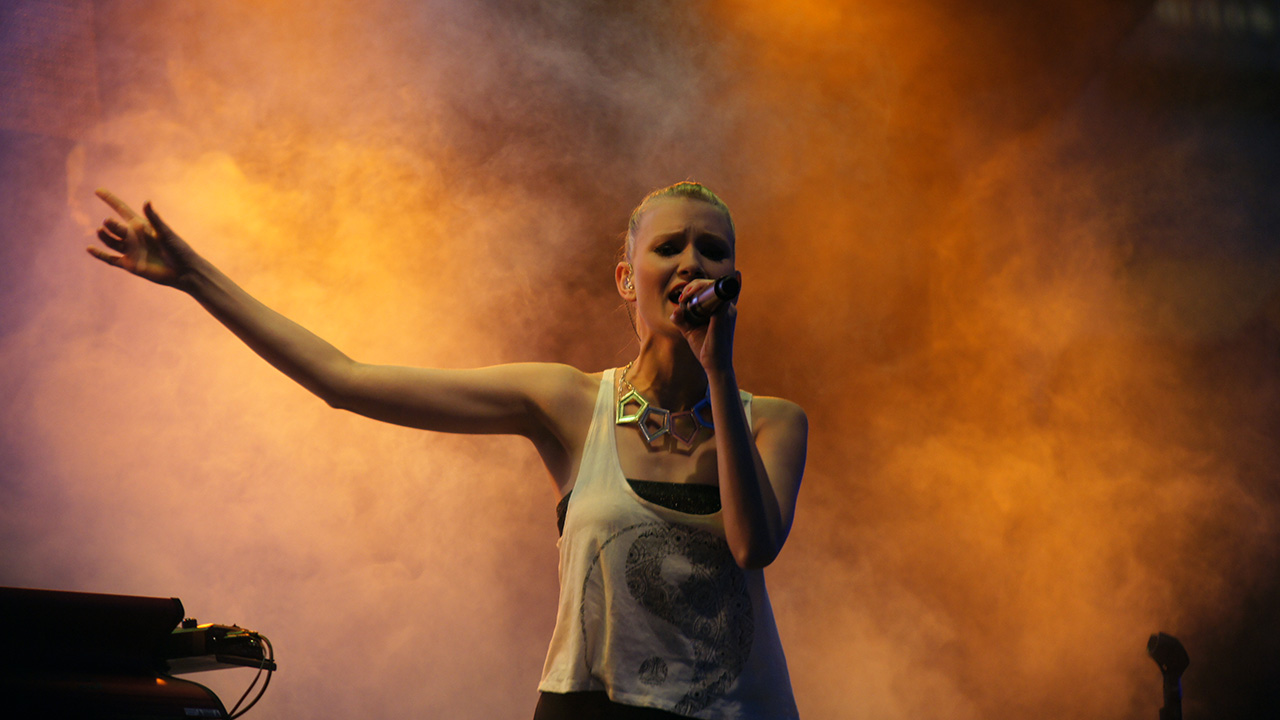
Carolin Niemczyk

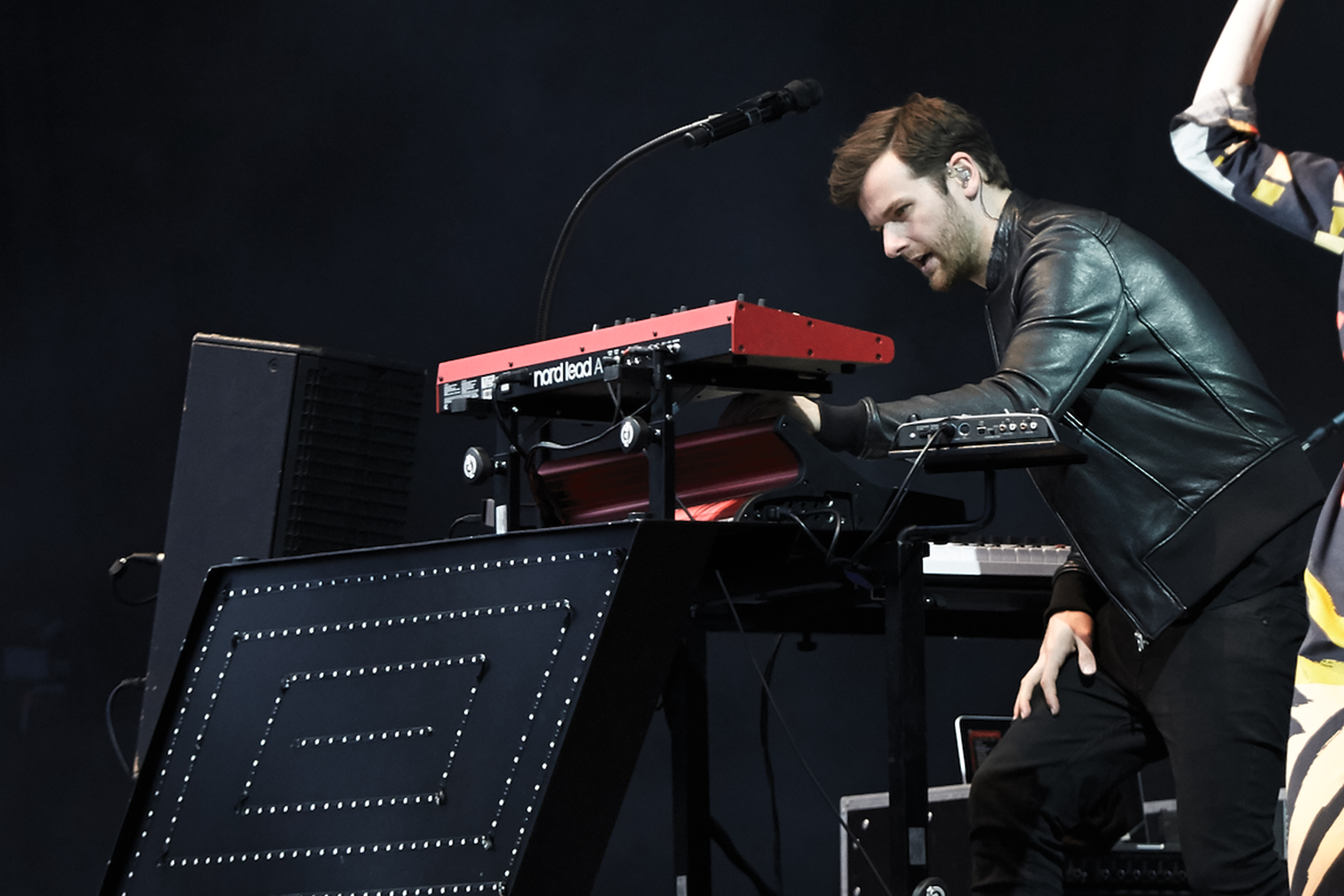
Daniel Grunenberg

- Carolin Niemczyk — born 24 July 1990 (age 36), vocals
- Daniel Grunenberg — born 8 November 1988 (age 37), vocals, keyboard

=== Live members ===
- Bene Neuner — drums
- Markus Vieweg — bass, keyboard
- Nico Schliemann — guitar, keyboard

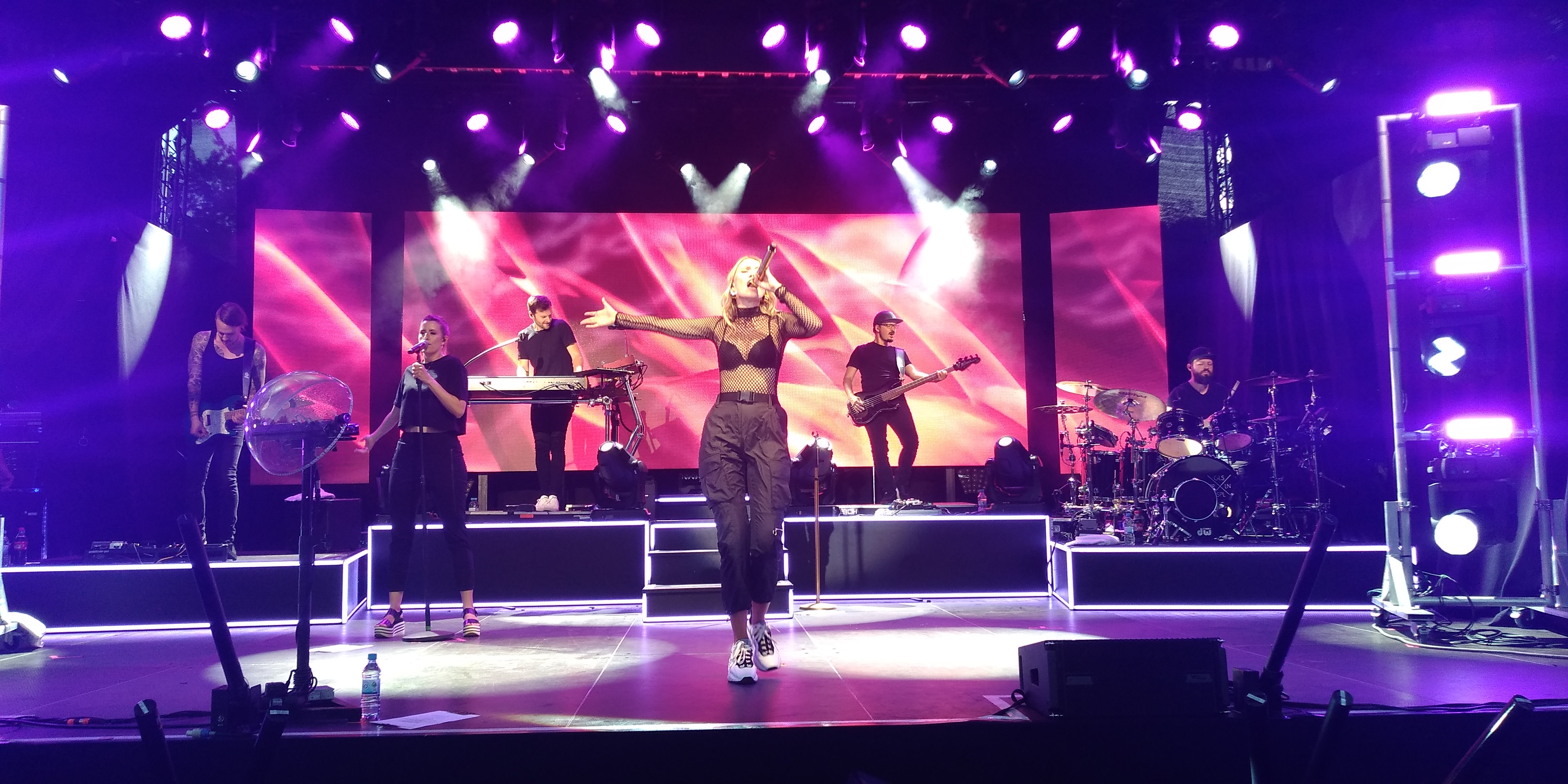
Band in concert (2019)

== Discography ==
=== Studio albums ===
Title	Album details	Peak chart positions			Certifications
Title	Album details	GER	AUT	SWI	Certifications
Beweg dich mit mir	Released: 30 September 2011; Label: Polydor; Format: CD, digital download	15	—	—	BVMI: Gold
Grenzenlos / Grenzenlos in diesem Moment	Released: 10 May 2013; Label: Polydor; Format: CD, digital download	8	—	61	BVMI: Gold
Tag X	Released: 29 May 2015; Label: Polydor; Format: CD, digital download	14	54	49	BVMI: Gold
Licht & Schatten	Released: 20 April 2018; Label: Polydor; Format: CD, digital download	5	23	40	

=== Singles ===
Title	Year	Peak chart positions			Certifications	Album
Title	Year	GER	AUT	SWI	Certifications	Album
"Echt"	2011	9	54	—	BVMI: Gold	Beweg dich mit mir
"Ich bin ich"	2012	32	—	—		Beweg dich mit mir
"Freundschaft"	2012	17	47	66		Beweg dich mit mir
"Nie vergessen"	2013	9	43	—	BVMI: Gold	Grenzenlos
"Grenzenlos"	2013	90	—	—		Grenzenlos
"Moment"	2014	63	—	—		Grenzenlos in diesem Moment
"Paris"	2015	—	—	—		Tag X
"Geiles Leben"	2015	2	2	1	BVMI: Diamond; AUT: Gold; SWI: Gold	Tag X
"Für immer"	2016	—	—	—		Tag X
"Royals & Kings" (featuring Summer Cem)	2018	70	—	—		Licht & Schatten
"Schatten & Licht"	2018	—	—	—		Licht & Schatten
"Schloss" (featuring Ali As)	2018	—	—	—		Licht & Schatten
"Du bist" (featuring Gordi Singers)	2018	—	—	—		Licht & Schatten
"Das Krasseste"	2019	—	—	—		Non-album singles
"Immer da"	2020	—	—	—		Non-album singles
"—" denotes a recording that did not chart or was not released in that territory.

=== Featured singles ===
Title	Year	Peak chart positions	Album
Title	Year	GER	Album
"Lichterkettenstadt" (Meine große Freundin Nadja featuring Glasperlenspiel)	2017	—	Non-album singles
"I Dare You (Trau Dich)" (Kelly Clarkson featuring Glasperlenspiel)	2020	—	Non-album singles
"Another Day in Paradise" (Alex Christensen and the Berlin Orchestra featuring Glasperlenspiel)	2022	—	Classical 80s Dance
