= Zenless Zone Zero =

2024 action role-playing game

- Developer: miHoYo
- Publishers: CHN: miHoYo; WW: HoYoverse; TWN: Nijigen Games; VNM: Gamota
- Producer: Li Zhenyu
- Composers: Sān-Z STUDIO: Zhou Bin; Yang Wutao; Song Peiyan; Lei Sheng
- Engine: Unity
- Platforms: Windows; iOS; Android; PlayStation 5; Xbox Series X/S
- Release: Windows, iOS, Android, PlayStation 5: WW: July 4, 2024; Xbox Series X/S: WW: June 6, 2025
- Genres: Action role-playing, hack and slash
- Mode: Single-player

Zenless Zone Zero
- Simplified Chinese: 绝区零
- Traditional Chinese: 絕區零
Transcriptions
Standard Mandarin
- Hanyu Pinyin: Jué Qū Líng
- Wade–Giles: Chüeh^{2} Ch'ü^{1} Ling^{2}
- IPA: [tɕɥě tɕʰý lǐŋ]
Yue: Cantonese
- Yale Romanization: Jyùt Keuih Lìhng
- Jyutping: Zyut^{6} Keoi^{1} Ling^{4}
- IPA: [tsyt̚˨ kʰɵɥ˥ lɪŋ˩]

Zenless Zone Zero (Note: Abbreviated as ZZZ or sometimes "Triple Z". Chinese: 绝区零; pinyin: Jué Qū Líng; lit. 'Absolute Zone Zero') is a free-to-play action role-playing game developed and published by miHoYo. It was released outside mainland China by HoYoverse.

Zenless Zone Zero was released on Windows, iOS, Android and PlayStation 5 on July 4, 2024. A port for Xbox Series X/S was released on June 6, 2025. It received generally positive reviews from critics, with praise of its gameplay, soundtrack, animation and characters.

== Gameplay ==
Screenshot of the Chain Attack with Ben Bigger, Robin (Bangboo), and Vivian Banshee

The player may select between two main characters, Wise and Belle, at the start of the game. They assume the role of a Proxy, a guide for hire who provides mapping and direction within supernatural disaster zones known as Hollows. The selected Proxy will interact with and hire Agents for protection in Hollows, who serve as the primary playable characters in place of the protagonist. Through gacha mechanics, the player may summon Agents for use in combat. In addition to Agents, players can summon rabbit-like robots called Bangboo to perform assistance actions. Parties are built from three Agents and one Bangboo, with emphasis on specific combinations to create synergistic teams. The created party is then used to fight enemies, which are represented by distorted entities known as Ethereals, as well as human opponents. Only one Agent may be actively controlled at any time, while other Agents may perform attacks or enhancements autonomously. The player can freely change the controlled Agent at any time in combat. Bangboo cannot be controlled in primary gameplay, but have been playable in platformer minigames available during event modes.

The game features an in-game clock system, with the days divided into morning, afternoon, evening, and midnight. Players may explore the overworld outside of combat to meet Agents at specific times and develop affinity with them.

=== Combat ===
The primary gameplay is a third-person real-time combat emphasizing player reaction and timing. Agents have a fixed fighting style specific to each character, typically blending ranged and melee combat, and character statistics may be improved using equipment known as Disc Drives and W-Engines. Disc Drives provide general buff effects usable by a variety of Agents, while W-Engines are limited to specific Agent types (known as Specialties) but offer stronger enhancements. Every Agent has a signature W-Engine that has been designed to enhance their abilities, which may be acquired using the same summoning system as Agents.

By deploying the abilities of different Agents and Bangboos, players are able to deal direct damage, apply damage-over-time reactions known as Anomaly Effects, and perform combination attacks known as Chain Attacks. Enemies may be dodged, countered, or parried using the Defensive Assist function, which allows the player to switch Agents within a short time window to block an attack. Enemies accumulate an effect known as Daze from Agent attacks, tracked below the enemy's health gauge. When the Daze bar has filled, the enemy is stunned for a brief period and receives increased damage.

=== Array Mode ===
Array Mode, commonly known as "TV Mode", was featured in the first few months of the game. Players explored Hollows by using a Bangboo avatar to travel on a 2D plane through an array of tiles represented as television screens. Movement was limited to four directions, and individual tiles would have varying effects based on the broader event the Array Mode was included in. Array Mode was phased out of future gameplay following the Version 1.2 update in September 2024, after mixed community reception to its gameplay. The mode can still be accessed in the "Hollow Zero: Withered Domain" activity, as well as the permanent exploration event "The Mystery of Arpeggio Fault".

== Story ==
Zenless Zone Zero follows the live service game model, with new updates (titled Versions) released approximately once every six weeks that add to the plot. Each Version contains quests known as Commissions, which follow the player's selected protagonist as they interact with Agents and non-playable characters, explore the Hollows and the city of New Eridu, and reveal more of the mysteries surrounding events prior to the start of the game. The game organizes major narrative arcs into Seasons, with each Season corresponding to a major Version update that increments the X value in an X.Y versioning scheme.

=== Setting and characters ===
Zenless Zone Zero takes place in the post-apocalyptic city-state of New Eridu. Large supernatural disaster zones, known as Hollows, have enveloped a majority of the planet and created alternate dimensions within the consumed space. Matter is distorted and corrupted within a Hollow due to a substance known as Ether, leading to sufficiently sentient life becoming twisted Ethereals if they remain within a Hollow for too long. Outside the Hollows, Ether is harvested as an energy source to allow for modern society to continue within New Eridu.

The plot follows siblings Belle and Wise, professional Proxies who illegally guide civilians through Hollows on a for-hire basis. The player may choose one of the two siblings to be the protagonist for the duration of the game: the selection may not be changed, and the sibling not selected will continue to appear in a supporting role throughout the plot. They work anonymously under the name of "Phaethon" and are considered among the best Proxies of all time. In order to support and disguise their activities, they operate a video rental store as a front. While juggling daily life and Proxy work, Belle and Wise are attempting to investigate their mentor's involvement in the expansion of Hollow Zero eleven years prior to the start of the game, which led to the collapse of the previous capital city and was a catastrophic event that affected nearly all current residents of New Eridu.

Despite falling into the "futuristic" category, Zenless Zone Zero adopts a retro and analog aesthetic, which is explained by the notion that modern technology is susceptible to corruption from overexposure to Ether. Characters operate flip phones or mobile phones reminiscent of models from the 2000s and 2010s. The video store, known as Random Play, rents VHS tapes to the citizens of New Eridu. CRT television sets are commonly seen throughout the game, and amusement arcades serve as a primary form of entertainment. While the outside world is largely unseen and implied to be heavily destroyed, producer Zhenyu Li has stated that New Eridu was designed to be lively and buzzing rather than depressing.

=== Plot ===
==== Season 1 ====
Wise and Belle are siblings who operate as Proxies under the pseudonym "Phaethon". During a mission, a powerful artificial intelligence called "Fairy" installs itself into Phaethon's Hollow Deep Dive (HDD) system when they're knocked unconscious trying to force out an external hacker. With Fairy, Phaethon's Proxy capabilities are greatly increased, allowing them to help multiple factions, including the Cunning Hares, Belobog Heavy Industries, and New Eridu Public Security (NEPS).

As they help, they uncover and stop a conspiracy headed by NEPS Inspector Justin Bringer and Sarah, a member of The Exaltists, whose goal is to "refine" humanity by embracing the Hollow Disaster. Along the way, Phaethon builds alliances with Section 6, a specialized operational unit, and the Sons of Calydon, a biker gang in the outskirts of New Eridu. They also reveal themselves to be adopted children of Carole Arna, a scientist of Helios Academy who is blamed for causing the fall of Old Eridu. Phaethon, believing Carole Arna to be innocent, is working to clear her name by attempting to find the true culprit.

In a mission requested by the Mayor of New Eridu, Phaethon investigates Sacrifices, a special type of Ethereal made only by human manipulation. With the help of the phantom thief group Mockingbird, Phaethon uncovers a conspiracy involving human and Sacrifice manipulation. During a battle, Phaethon unknowingly uses a mysterious power to save Vivian Banshee, a member of Mockingbird, from corrupting into an Ethereal. In the aftermath, the Mayor sends Phaethon to Waifei Peninsula along with Yixuan, the High Preceptor of Yunkui Summit, for further investigation.

==== Season 2 ====
Arriving in Waifei Peninsula, Phaethon, with the help of Yunkui Summit, Spook Shack, and Obol Squad, stop multiple Exaltist conspiracies, foiling plans to cause chaos among the Peninsula. In the aftermath, One member of Yunkui Summit, Ye Shunguang, is awarded the title of "Void Hunter" by the Mayor for defeating Sarah, one of the leaders of the Exaltists.

During a contest to win a special W-Engine, Phaethon meets Remielle Dan, one of the first Void Hunters from a century ago. With the help of the Krampus Compliance Authority, a subsidiary of TOPS, they find Remielle's weapon, Thaumiel, who possesses Phaethon. They are saved by Remielle, who reveals that the special W-Engine is the "key" to unlocking Thaumiel. Back at Random Play, Phaethon is visited by Norma and Velina, members of the External Strategy Department of Roscaelifer. They tell them that due to their recent symptoms, they are invited to go to Roscaelifer for treatment. They also warn Phaethon to not interact further with Remielle, claiming that she is currently wanted for the attempted assassination of Roscaelifer's leader, Lady Sunbringer.

==== Season 3 ====
Phaethon, along with Norma and Velina, travel to Roscaelifer for their treatment. After arriving, they discover that the original Sunbringer divided herself into three Sunbringers: Dracaene, Eldreda, and Lindverne Sunbringer, each a director of a respective department. During treatment, Phaethon awakens their Etheric Other Pyrois after an interal battle with Helios, an entity that manifested inside Phaethon during their time at Helios Academy.

== Development ==
Zenless Zone Zero was produced by Zhenyu Li. The development team cited Persona 5, Digimon World, and Street Fighter as influences for Zenless Zone Zero, influences from Street Fighter can be seen within the animation of characters during combat while the influences of Digimon World can be seen in the implementation of the in-game clock system. The development team stressed that Zenless Zone Zero has a unique style.

Characters in Zenless Zone Zero have different designs based on their faction; For instance, the design for Victoria Housekeeping characters is based on Victorian-era butlers and maids with tropes from horror movies. There is an emphasis on quality over quantity regarding the development of characters.

Unlike the character designs in miHoYo's previous games such as Genshin Impact and Honkai: Star Rail, Zenless Zone Zero took a different direction with its variety of playable characters; There are non-human playable characters such as Ben Bigger, a grizzly bear, Soukaku, a blue-colored oni, and Billy Kid, an android gunslinger. During the planning stages, these non-human characters were not intended to be present in the game but the team did find them fun and later incorporated them into the game.

The developer has adjusted gameplay elements after player feedback. Late in 2024, the TV Mode was largely truncated due to generally negative reception of the puzzle-based design. The version 2.0 update in July 2025 optimized the hub world design and user interface to improve player's experience.

== Marketing and release ==
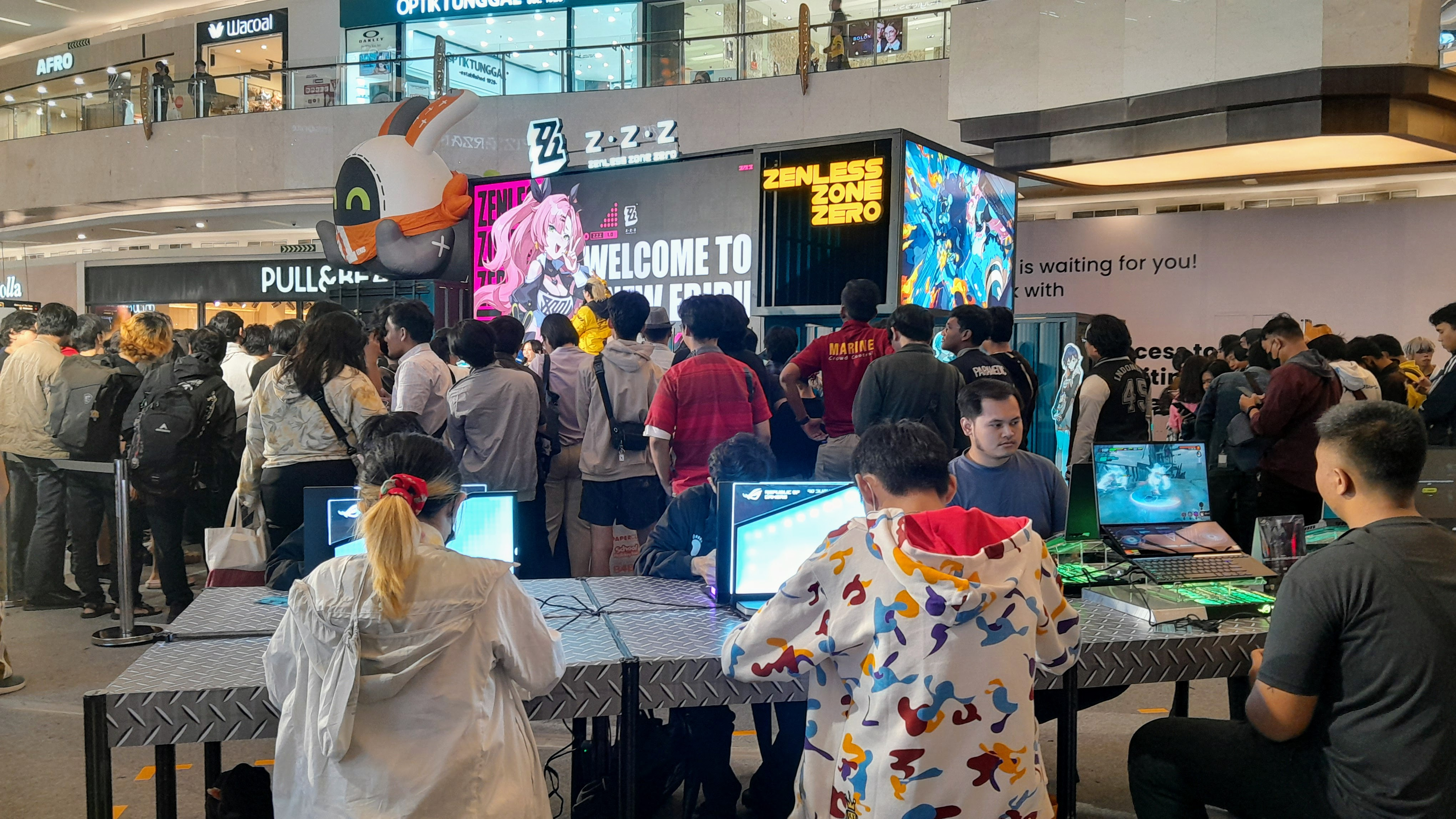
People playing Zenless Zone Zero and waiting at the main stage of the Welcome To New Eridu event in Jakarta

miHoYo revealed the game in May 2022 and began holding closed beta tests, known as "Tuning Tests", for PC and iOS in August of the same year. A second closed beta test, called an "Equalizing Test", was also held for PC and iOS in November 2023. A third beta test, called an "Amplifying Test", was held for Android, PC, and iOS, in April 2024. During Sony Interactive Entertainment's State of Play presentation in January 2024, a PlayStation 5 port of the game was announced as a timed console exclusive. A technical test was held for the PS5 in April 2024. The release date was announced in late May of that same year. In June 2026, miHoYo released the game on Steam.

The game was released on July 4. To promote the game, HoYoverse collaborated with several graffiti artists to create Zenless Zone Zero-themed graffiti in 19 cities in Indonesia. An advertisement campaign on the Manila Light Rail Transit in the Philippines was held. A series of launch events titled "New Eridu City Tour" is being held in 19 locations worldwide. Another series of events titled "Zenless Dazzle Expo" is held within six comic conventions.

In July 2024, HoYoverse, through a collaboration between them and Lofi Girl, released a Zenless Zone Zero-themed Lofi Girl video featuring the character Belle though its HoYoFair YouTube channel, which features lo-fi remixes of select Zenless Zone Zero soundtracks. (Note: The HoYoFair program was created by HoYoverse to showcase fan art and animations that are made by creators inside/outside the Hoyoverse community based on games developed by miHoYo / HoYoverse. These submissions are often featured on HoYoFair's YouTube channel while some of these submissions have been used to advertise their games in the form of community-driven advertising.)

== Reception ==
Reception

Aggregate scores
Aggregator	Score
Metacritic	iOS: 72/100; PC: 77/100; PS5: 73/100
OpenCritic	73% recommend

Review scores
Publication	Score
Destructoid	8/10
Eurogamer	4/5
Famitsu	34/40
GameSpot	7/10
IGN	8/10
PC Gamer (UK)	55/100

Prior to the game's release, the Chinese video game news website 17173 noted that HoYoverse had significant experience with action games, considering Zenless Zone Zero as both a return to the genre and a potential breakthrough for the company. They believed that HoYoverse had yet to encounter significant rivals in the action game category and that Zenless Zone Zero could "stabilize and expand the user market." 17173 also emphasized the game's strong stylized design and trendy visual elements, noting that it inherited HoYoverse's expertise in the action category while presenting a distinct and unique work.

Eurogamer said that the combat and day-to-day exploration exciting, and the world setting unique and immersive. Kotaku said its combat system is similar to miHoYo's previous game, Honkai Impact 3rd.

Paste, in its more critical review, praised the character design and variety, while calling the starter playable characters' usage repetitive and the TV mode dull and uninspiring. PC Gamer criticized the combat system by calling it "mindless mouse clicking".

In Japan, four critics from Famitsu gave the game a total score of 34 out of 40.

Zenless Zone Zero has surpassed 50 million downloads around the world just three days after launch. The mobile version of the game grossed almost US$52 million in its first 11 days and US$100 million in its first month. Chinese video game news website GameLook estimated the total revenue from all platforms of the game for July 2024 to exceed CN¥ 2.2 billion (US$306 (equivalent to $314.05 in 2025) million.)

=== Accolades ===
Year	Award	Category	Result	Ref(s).
2024	China Game Innovation Competition	Best Innovative Game Award	Won	
2024	Gamescom Awards	Best Mobile Game	Nominated	
2024	App Store Awards	iPhone Game of the Year	Nominated	
2024	PlayStation Partner Awards	Partner Award	Won	
2024	The Game Awards 2024	Best Mobile Game	Nominated	
2024	The Game Awards 2024	Players' Voice	Nominated	
2024	UCG Game Awards	Best Mobile Game	Won	
2025	New York Game Awards 2024	A-Train Award for Best Mobile Game	Won	
