= Tears of Themis =

2020 adventure video game

- Developer: miHoYo
- Publishers: CHN: miHoYo; TWN/HKG/MAC: Nijigen Games; WW: HoYoverse
- Composers: HOYO-MiX: Cai Jinhan; Cui Wei; Kou Youyou; Yang Qixiang; Yin Chunqing; Wang Anyu; Zheng Yujie
- Engine: Unity
- Platforms: Android, iOS
- Release: CHN: July 30, 2020; TW: August 20, 2020; WW: July 29, 2021
- Genres: Adventure, visual novel
- Mode: Single-player

Tears of Themis (ToT) (Note: Chinese: 未定事件簿; pinyin: Wèidìng Shìjiàn Bù; lit. 'Undecided Case Files') is a free-to-play detective otome mobile game developed and published in mainland China by Chinese developer miHoYo, and published globally by its Singapore-based subsidiary HoYoverse. The game was released in mainland China in July 2020 for Android and iOS. Later, the game released in Taiwan, then world-wide with two separate releases a year later. The global release includes voice acting in Simplified Chinese, Traditional Chinese, Japanese and Korean, as well as text for a variety of languages.

== Gameplay ==
The main story of Tears of Themis is delivered in a visual novel format. Cases are analyzed through investigation with one or more of the male leads, searching the crime scene for evidence, and interrogating non-player characters who are involved. Usually, each chapter ends with a trial in court, in which the player must present evidence which proves their defendant innocent.

During each chapter, debates play out in a card battle format using cards collected from the gacha system. Each card has an attribute which changes what cards it is effective against. The three attributes are Intuition, Logic, and Empathy. Cards can be leveled up to increase attribute stats, refined to increase their influence in battle or have their skill proficiency increased. The cards also gain experience through being used in debates.

For the romance side of the gameplay, there are side stories which explore the characterization of the four male leads and their relationship with the protagonist. Each of the four male leads has at least one personal story chapter. Cards rated SR, SSR and MR also have a story involving the character displayed on them. The player also receives voice and text messages from them, framed as if they were sent to the player character in-universe.

Voice acting for the entire game is available in Chinese (Simplified and Traditional), Japanese, and Korean in the Global version.

== Story ==
Tears of Themis takes place in the year 2030, in the fictional city of Stellis. The player takes on the role of a female defense lawyer, whose name can be customized, who works for the Themis Legal Office. She defends her clients in various criminal cases alongside the four male leads and romance interests: Luke Pearce, Artem Wing, Vyn Richter, and Marius Von Hagen. The player character, alongside the four male leads, also joins a secret investigation team dedicated to solving the mystery behind the illegal distribution of a dangerous drug known as NXX. In various side stories, the player can also learn more about each of the main heroine's possible suitors through their own personal character stories known as Blossom Chapters.

== Characters ==
Main Character (Code Name: Rosa)

The playable silent protagonist, a 24-year-old female attorney at Themis Legal Office. She is studying for her advancement exam, later taking on cases that eventually revolve around the NXX drug. She is Luke Pearce's childhood friend, and Artem Wing's junior partner, though she is later recruited by Artem and Vyn Richter as a potential member of their secret investigation team. The Main Character's chosen code name in the secret investigation team is Rosa.

Luke Pearce (Chinese: 夏彦; Japanese: 水無瀬夏彦; Korean: 강혁; Code Name: Raven)

A private detective who owns his own antique store called Time's Antiques as a front for his private investigation business, Pearce Private Investigations. Luke and the MC are childhood friends but Luke left eight years before the start of the main story, after his early acceptance to the prestigious National Central University. Later, he was recruited into a closed confidential national project, which included no contact with the outside world. They are reunited by coincidence during an investigation, although Luke is hiding details of those past eight years from the MC. Luke's code name in the secret investigation team is Raven.

Artem Wing (Chinese: 左然; Japanese: 左京静真; Korean: 백은후; Code Name: Libra)

A senior attorney at Themis Legal Office. He graduated from Stellis University with a Doctorate in Law at the age of 25. Over the course of his career, Artem is the youngest senior attorney and a legend among the industry, as well as being the MC's senior partner and mentor in the Law Firm. With his expansive general knowledge, he has a winning track record currently at 99%. Artem's code name in the secret investigation team is Libra.

Vyn Richter (Chinese: 莫弈; Japanese: 森月黎; Korean: 윤노아; Code Name: Adjudicator)

From Giannovyn Mental Health Research Center, and frequent visiting professor for Stellis University, Vyn currently holds both a doctorate degree in psychology and pedagogy. After moving into the city of Stellis, he devoted his time into the study of criminal psychology, publishing several papers. His past is not known to many. Vyn's code name in the secret investigation team is Adjudicator.

Marius Von Hagen (Chinese: 陆景和; Japanese: 和泉景; Korean: 유신우; Code Name: King)

The heir to his family's multinational corporation, PAX Group. Originally, his brother Giann Von Hagen was next in line, but later reassigned to a different branch overseas and went missing, thus passing the role onto Marius. Outside his role of acting CEO, Marius is skilled in arts. Graduating with honors in the Florence College of Art, he is able to be himself without the attention of the media. He later returns to Stellis to continue his post-graduate studies in art, alongside his duties at PAX. Marius's code name in the secret investigation team is King.

== Development ==
The worldwide version of the game was in a closed beta period from April to May 2021. A pre-registration period began in June 2021, which gave those who registered early free rewards in game. Over 650,000 players pre-registered. There was a second pre-release campaign counting the number of Twitter followers on the official account, which also gave in-game rewards. Tears of Themis was a finalist for the 2022 Pocket Gamer People's Choice Award.
