= I Dare You (Kelly Clarkson song) =

Single by Kelly Clarkson
- Language: English; French; German; Hebrew; Moroccan Arabic; Spanish
- Released: April 16, 2020
- Recorded: 2019
- Length: 3:36
- Label: Atlantic
- Songwriters: Jesse Shatkin; Jeff Gitelman; Natalie Hemby; Laura Veltz; Ben West
- Producer: Jesse Shatkin

Kelly Clarkson singles chronology
"Broken & Beautiful" (2019)	"I Dare You" (2020)	"Under The Mistletoe" (2020)

Zaz singles chronology
"On s'en remet jamai" (2019)	"I Dare You (Appelle ton amour)" (2020)

Faouzia singles chronology
"Wake Me When It's Over" (2020)	"I Dare You (كنتحداك)" (2020)	"I Fly" (2020)

Blas Cantó singles chronology
"Mi luz" (2020)	"I Dare You (Te Reto A Amar)" (2020)	"Cúrame" (2021)

Glasperlenspiel singles chronology
"Royals & Kings" (2018)	"I Dare You (Trau Dich)" (2020)

Maya Bouskilla singles chronology
"אני רואה אותך" (2019)	"I Dare You (בוא נראה)" (2020)

"I Dare You" is a song by American singer Kelly Clarkson. Produced and written by Jesse Shatkin, with additional writing by Natalie Hemby, Laura Veltz, Ben West, and Jeff "Gitty" Gitelman, it was released as a stand-alone single by Atlantic Records on April 16, 2020. Unlike her previous records, its single release includes multiple versions of the song recorded in several languages as a duet featuring various recording artists—such as French singer Zaz, Canadian-Moroccan singer Faouzia for the Moroccan Arabic version, Spanish singer Blas Cantó, German musical duo Glasperlenspiel, Israeli singer Maya Bouskilla for the Hebrew version, and the American Deaf West Theatre for the American Sign Language version. The Hebrew version reached number one in Israel.

== Background and release ==
"I Dare You" was written by Jesse Shatkin and Gitty, Natalie Hemby, Laura Veltz and Ben West. In her opening monologue on a February 2020 episode of her self-titled talk show, Clarkson revealed her plans to release the song. Israeli singer Maya Bouskilla also announced that she was invited by Warner Music Group (Atlantic Records's parent label) to record the song as a duet with Clarkson as part of a single release featuring select recording artists from all over the world, which included French singer Zaz, Canadian-Moroccan singer Faouzia, Spanish singer Blas Cantó, and German musical duo Glasperlenspiel. She also announced plans to film the single's debut live performance on The Kelly Clarkson Show on March 24, its original intended date of release, but was halted due to the COVID-19 pandemic. On April 3, 2020, Clarkson announced the single's release date as April 16, 2020, accompanied by a special episode of The Kelly Clarkson Show the same day.

== Critical reception ==
"I Dare You" has received positive reception, with critics praising the unique six-language recording of the song and the various vocal performances, particularly of Clarkson, who recorded the song in all six languages.

== Track listing ==
All tracks are written by Jesse Shatkin, Jeff Gitelman, Natalie Hemby, Laura Veltz and Ben West, who are principal songwriters of the original version, and also credited as the composers for the translated versions. Commissioned translators of the original lyrics were credited as its lyricists:

Single – Multi-language Duets
No.	Title	Translator(s)	Length
1.	"I Dare You"		3:36
2.	"I Dare You (Appelle ton amour)" (featuring Zaz)	Doriand; Isabelle Geffroy	3:38
3.	"I Dare You (كنتحداك)" (featuring Faouzia)	Faouzia Ouihya	3:36
4.	"I Dare You (Te Reto A Amar)" (featuring Blas Cantó)	Blas Cantó; Daniel Ortega; Emilio Mercader; Daniel Hammond Pascual	3:36
5.	"I Dare You (Trau Dich)" (featuring Glasperlenspiel)	Max Embers; Carolin Niemczyk	3:36
6.	"I Dare You (בוא נראה)" (featuring Maya Bouskilla)	Noam Horev	3:36

Single – Eden Prince Remix
No.	Title	Length
1.	"I Dare You" (Eden Prince Remix)	2:58
2.	"I Dare You"	3:36

Single – Arkadi Remix
No.	Title	Length
1.	"I Dare You" (Arkadi Remix)	3:25
2.	"I Dare You"	3:36

== Personnel ==
Credits adapted from Spotify metadata.

- Vocals – Kelly Clarkson
- Featured vocals – Zaz (Appelle ton amour version)
- Featured vocals – Faouzia (كنتحداك version)
- Featured vocals – Blas Cantó (Te Reto A Amar version)
- Featured vocals – Glasperlenspiel (Trau Dich version)
- Featured vocals – Maya Bouskilla (בוא נראה version)
- Background Vocals – Harlœ
- Background vocals – Natalie Hemby
- Guitar – Benji Lysaght
- Mastering – Chris Gehringer
- Guitar – Erick Serna
- Engineer – Jasmine Chen
- Guitar – Jeff "Gitty" Gitelman
- Bass, drums, drum programming, guitar, keyboards, engineering, production, percussion, synthesizer – Jesse Shatkin
- Mixing engineering – John Hanes
- Drums, strings – Sam Dent
- Engineer – Sam Dent
- Mixer – Serban Ghenea
- Piano – Tommy King
- Recording coordinator – Yakov Lamay (בוא נראה version)

== Charts ==
=== Weekly charts ===
Chart performance for "I Dare You"
Chart (2020)	Peak position
Australia Digital Tracks (ARIA)	29
Belgium (Ultratip Bubbling Under Wallonia) Appelle ton amour featuring Zaz	26
Canada Hot 100 (Billboard)	89
Canada AC (Billboard)	23
Canada Hot AC (Billboard)	43
Germany Download (Official German Charts)	56
Hungary (Rádiós Top 40)	32
Israel Domestic Airplay (Media Forest) Version with Maya Bouskilla	1
New Zealand Hot Singles (RMNZ)	38
Scotland Singles (Official Charts)	42
UK Singles Downloads (Official Charts)	47
US Billboard Hot 100	86
US Adult Contemporary (Billboard)	15
US Adult Pop Airplay (Billboard)	14

=== Year-end charts ===
Year-end chart performance for "I Dare You"
Chart (2020)	Position
US Adult Contemporary (Billboard)	47
US Adult Top 40 (Billboard)	48

== Release history ==
List of releases of "I Dare You"
Region	Date	Format	Label	Catalog number	Ref.
Various	April 16, 2020	Multi-language Duets	Atlantic	075679821508	
United States	April 20, 2020	Hot adult contemporary radio	Atlantic; Elektra	—N/a	
Various	May 15, 2020	Eden Prince Remix	Atlantic	USAT22002360	
Various	June 12, 2020	Arkadi Remix	Atlantic	USAT22002361	
