= Faouzia =

Moroccan-Canadian singer and musician

Faouzia فوزية
- Faouzia in 2026

Background information
- Born: Faouzia Ouihya; July 5, 2000 (age 26); Casablanca, Morocco
- Origin: Carman, Manitoba, Canada
- Genres: Pop; R&B; synth-pop
- Occupations: Singer; songwriter; instrumentalist
- Instruments: Vocals; piano; violin; guitar; Darbouka
- Years active: 2015–present
- Labels: Atlantic; Artist Partner; Kobalt; Plush; Stem
- Website: faouziaofficial.com

YouTube information
- Channel: Faouzia
- Years active: 2013
- Genres: Music; Makeup
- Subscribers: 3.02 million
- Views: 1.23 billion
- Last updated: 22 September 2026

Faouzia Ouihya (Arabic: فوزية أويحيى, romanized: Fawziya Uwīḥiya, pronounced [ˈfawzija ʔuˈwiːħija]; French: [fauzja]; born 5 July 2000), known mononymously as Faouzia, is a Moroccan and Canadian singer, songwriter and musician. Born in Casablanca, Morocco, she moved with her family to Canada at a young age. During that time she learned how to play various instruments, and began composing her first songs. She released several singles and collaborated with many musicians on vocals and songwriting prior to releasing her debut extended play (EP), Stripped, in August 2020. In 2023, she was nominated and was one of the recipients of the Top 25 Canadian Immigrant Awards.

== Life and career ==
=== 2000–2014: Early life ===
Faouzia Ouihya was born in Casablanca, Morocco, to Mohammed Ouihya and Bouchra Alaoui. She moved with her family at the age of one to Notre-Dame-de-Lourdes, Manitoba, Canada, before settling in the rural town of Carman, Manitoba. She has two sisters: Samia (one of her managers) and Kenza (her photographer). She was raised Muslim and often traveled to her native country. Faouzia said she feels "very connected to the country and the region [North Africa]. Even though I grew up in Canada, I grew up eating Moroccan food, [and] wearing Moroccan attire." In an interview she revealed she felt excluded as a child, saying "maybe not just fitting in is the biggest thing I've had to overcome". Her first composition was inspired by this feeling of exclusion, in which she embraced people's differences. Her passion for music began at the age of four when she watched her sister Samia play the piano and wished she could learn how to play it. Faouzia began writing songs and poems when she was five years old and playing piano at the age of six. She later studied how to play guitar and violin. She speaks fluent English, French, and Arabic, the latter being the one she mostly uses with her family. When Faouzia was 13 years old, she began posting covers on YouTube, garnering hundreds of thousands of views.

=== 2015–2019: Career beginnings ===
At the age of fifteen, Faouzia won Song of the Year, the Audience Award, and Grand Prix at the 2015 La Chicane Électrique. Her YouTube cover of Adele's Hello convinced Tim Jones, award-winning co-founder and manager of local music company Pipe & Hat, to sign her. Thanks to her early success, she released her debut single "Knock on My Door" on 1 November 2015 through various platforms, receiving radio airplay throughout the area.

In 2016, she won second place in the Canada's Walk of Fame Emerging Artist Mentorship Program. In 2017, Faouzia became the first teenager and first Canadian to receive the Grand Prize of the Nashville Unsigned Only music competition with "Knock on My Door", beating 6,000 other entries from 90 countries. The same year, she collaborated with fellow Manitoban artist Matt Epp on their single "The Sound" and won the prestigious International Songwriting Competition, the largest songwriting competition in the world. The two are the first Canadians in the competition's 16-year history to win the top prize, beating 16,000 other entries from 137 countries. Not long after, Faouzia was signed to Paradigm Talent Agency and released "My Heart's Grave". She performed with the Winnipeg Symphony Orchestra at The Forks, Winnipeg, celebrating the 150th anniversary of Canada.

Faouzia is featured in the song "Battle" on David Guetta's studio album 7, announced on 24 August 2018. In a French language interview with Le Matin, Guetta noted Faouzia's "great voice, powerful vibrato, and unique style" as why he chose her for his album. Faouzia recalled she "was still in high school when I heard the news that there was a possibility of me working with him" and affirmed it was "one of my proudest career moments, so far." At that time, she enrolled in the University of Manitoba, majoring in computer engineering. She also featured in the song "Money" on French rapper Ninho's studio album Destin and the song got certified gold on 9 July 2019.

=== 2020–2023: Stripped and Citizens ===
In early 2020, Faouzia was invited by Kelly Clarkson to translate her song "I Dare You" to Moroccan Arabic, which was released on 16 April. About a month later, the Swedish EDM duo Galantis invited her to feature in their song "I Fly" for the soundtrack of the film Scoob! (2020). On 6 August, Faouzia released her first extended play, Stripped. It features six stripped songs, five of which were previously released, and one of which, "100 Bandaids", is a new track. To promote the EP, she performed the tracks live in a concert at the Burton Cummings Theatre on 20 August. On 5 November 2020, Faouzia released the single "Minefields" alongside American singer-songwriter John Legend.

On 21 March 2021, Faouzia released "Don't Tell Me I'm Pretty" on YouTube. On 29 June, she released "Hero" and its accompanying video-game-themed music video. In July, Faouzia revealed that she has been working on her debut studio album for a few years. On 28 October, she released "Puppet".

On 30 March 2022, Faouzia announced her second EP, Citizens, and released "RIP, Love" as a single from the project. Citizens was released on 19 May and features her previously released singles "Minefields", "Don't Tell Me I'm Pretty", and "Puppet". On 15 July 2022, she embarked on her first ever tour titled the Citizens Tour, consisting of 31 shows across Europe and North America. On 7 October, she released "Habibi (My Love)".

On 14 April 2023, Faouzia released "I'm Blue", a rendition of Blue (Da Ba Dee) by Eiffel 65 that was previously released on YouTube on 30 August 2019. As part of a project titled Doll Summer, she released the singles "Don't Call Me" and "Plastic Therapy" on 9 June, followed by "La La La" on 4 August and "IL0V3Y0U" on 8 September. On 23 June, Faouzia and French DJ Martin Solveig released "Now or Never", which serves as a single from Solveig's upcoming sixth studio album.

=== 2024–present: Independence and FILM NOIR ===
Faouzia cowrote the track "Beg Forgiveness" from ¥$ (Kanye West and Ty Dolla Sign) album Vultures 1, released on 10 February 2024. From May to July 2024, she competed on the ninth season of the Chinese singing competition Singer 2024, finishing in fourth place.

In November 2024, Faouzia stated on Instagram that she was "now an independent artist for the first time in 6+ years and the first time in [her] professional career," marking her parting with her former music label, Atlantic Records.

On 2 October 2025, she announced on Instagram that her debut album, Film Noir, would be released on 7 November 2025. On 20 April 2026, she announced the Film Noir World Tour, her first international headline tour in nearly four years. On 12 June 2026, she released Film Noir (fin), which features three new tracks.

On 2 September 2026, her song "Unethical" surpassed one million daily streams on Spotify, making it her first-ever song to cross one million daily streams on the platform.

== Artistry ==
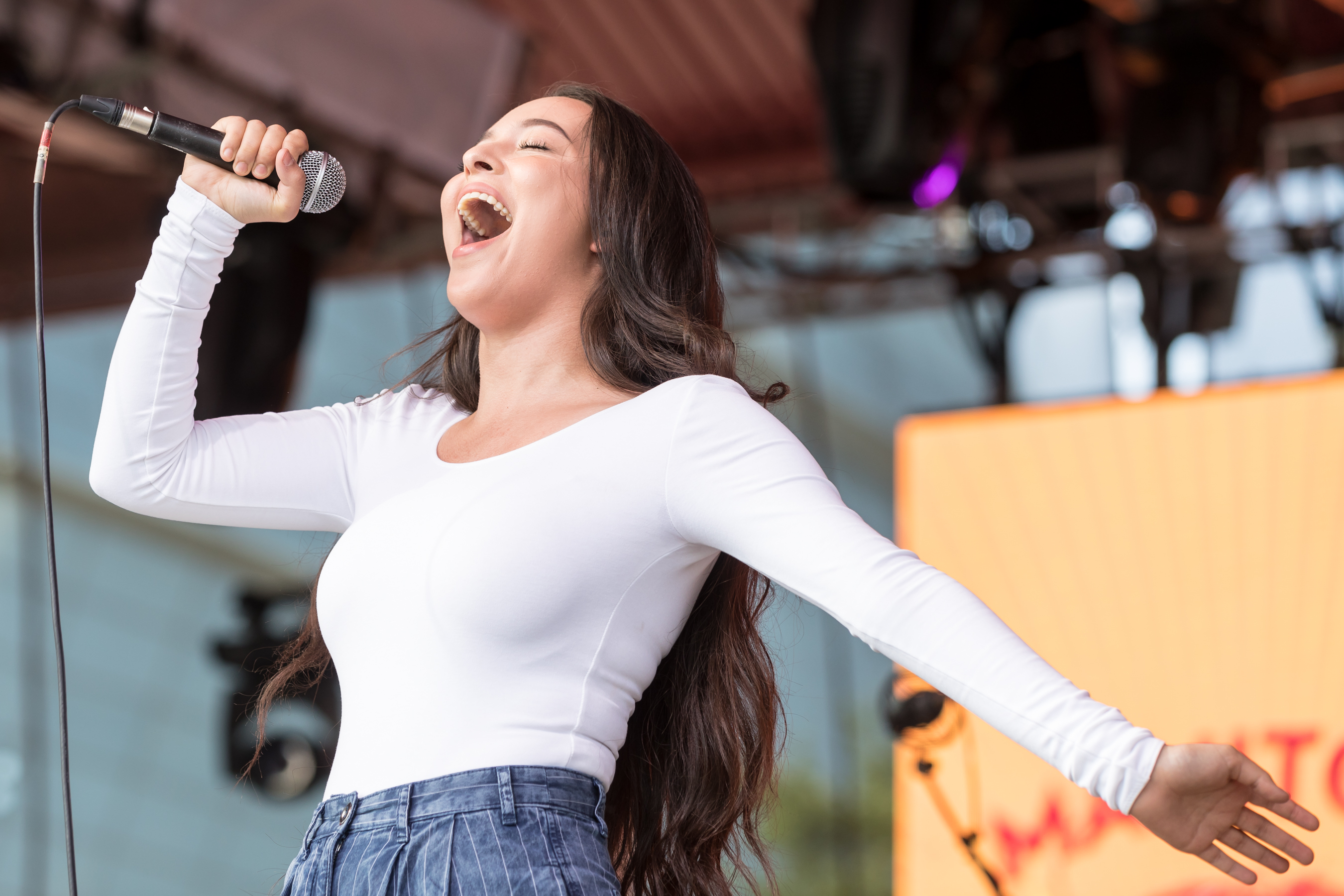
Faouzia performing at the 2017 Canada Summer Games

=== Musical style and themes ===
Faouzia is a pop, R&B, synth-pop, and acoustic pop artist. She has described her music as "emotional" and "intense". Her early songwriting was heavily inspired by people she was close to. However, her later songs were more personal since she "really wanted my heart in my story." Gloria Morey noted that her music has "the musical elements of upbeat pop songs which often contain quite shallow lyrics, but Faouzia's lyrics are very meaningful and, well, the opposite of shallow." Faouzia sings mostly in English language, featuring Arabic tonalities in her vocals. She has also performed in Arabic and in French language.

=== Influences ===
Faouzia cites her parents and sisters as her biggest influence in pursuing a music career. She grew up listening to pop musicians Rihanna, Lady Gaga, Ariana Grande, Beyoncé, Sia, Adele, Kelly Clarkson, and John Legend. About Rihanna, she said "has always been an inspiration of mine growing up and still to this day." Faouzia added that Rihanna, Beyoncé, Lady Gaga, and Sia are her major influences as a songwriter. She said that "Say Something" by A Great Big World featuring Christina Aguilera and "Hello" by Adele are some of her favourite songs. At a young age she listened alongside her parents to Arab music acts such as Umm Kulthum and Fairuz. Faouzia declared they "are two of my all-time favourite artists." She also listened to Assala Nasri and Khaled. When she was learning music she listened to composers Chopin, Bach, and Mozart. Pop rock bands Fall Out Boy and Imagine Dragons have also served as influences for her, and she attended one of the latter's concerts.

== Discography ==
=== Albums ===
Title	Detail	Notes
Film Noir	Released: November 7, 2025; Label: Stem; Format: CD, LP, digital download, streaming	Track list: 1. "Lost My Mind in Paris" (3:09); 2. "Peace & Violence" (2:56); 3. "Unethical" (3:40); 4. "Tous ces mots" (1:56); 5. "Sweet Fever" (3:29); 6. "Don't Ever Leave Me" (3:53); 7. "Desert Rose" (3:27); 8. "Weirdo" (2:56); 9. "Porcelain" (4:05); 10. "Ornament" (2:54); 11. "Pretty Stranger" (2:44)

=== Extended plays ===
Title	Detail	Notes
Stripped	Released: August 6, 2020; Label: Atlantic, Artist Partner; Format: Digital download, streaming	Track list: 1. "How It All Works Out" (3:24); 2. "Bad Dreams" (2:51); 3. "Tears of Gold" (4:10); 4. "You Don't Even Know Me" (3:02); 5. "100 Bandaids" (2:38); 6. "Born Without a Heart" (3:49)
Citizens	Released: May 19, 2022; Label: Atlantic; Format: CD, digital download, streaming	Track list: 1. "RIP, Love" (2:53); 2. "Thick and Thin" (2:41); 3. "Anybody Else" (3:20); 4. "SoLie" (2:22); 5. "I Know" (2:55); 6. "Don't Tell Me I'm Pretty" (3:00); 7. "Minefields" (3:10); 8. "Puppet" (2:55)

=== Singles ===
==== As lead artist ====
Title	Year	Peak chart position										Album
Title	Year	CAN	CAN CHR	CAN AC	AUS	FRA	LBN	SGP	UK	US	WW	Album
"Knock on My Door"	2015	—	—	—	—	—	—	—	—	—	—	Non-album singles
"My Heart's Grave"	2017	—	—	—	—	—	—	—	—	—	—	Non-album singles
"Bad Dreams"(piano)	2018	—	—	—	—	—	—	—	—	—	—	Stripped
"This Mountain"	2018	—	—	—	—	—	—	—	—	—	—	Non-album singles
"Born Without a Heart"	2019	—	—	—	—	—	—	—	—	—	—	Non-album singles
"You Don't Even Know Me"	2019	—	46	—	—	—	—	—	—	—	—	Non-album singles
"Tears of Gold"	2019	—	—	—	—	—	—	—	—	—	—	Non-album singles
"The Road"	2020	—	—	—	—	—	—	—	—	—	—	Non-album singles
"Wake Me When It's Over"	2020	—	—	—	—	—	—	—	—	—	—	Non-album singles
"Secrets"	2020	—	—	—	—	—	—	—	—	—	—	Non-album singles
"How It All Works Out"	2020	—	—	—	—	—	—	—	—	—	—	Non-album singles
"Minefields" (with John Legend)	2020	— (Note: "Minefields" did not enter the Canadian Hot 100, but peaked at number 45 on the Canadian Digital Song Sales chart.)	—	—	—	43	—	—	—	—	—	Citizens
"Hero"	2021	—	21	34	—	—	—	—	—	—	—	Non-album singles
"Hung Up" (Childhood Memories — Deezer Originals)	2021	—	—	—	—	—	—	—	—	—	—	Non-album singles
"Puppet"	2021	—	—	—	—	—	—	—	—	—	—	Citizens
"RIP, Love"	2022	—	—	—	—	—	16	27	—	—	—	Citizens
"Habibi (My Love)"	2022	—	—	—	—	—	—	—	—	—	—	Non-album singles
"I'm Blue"	2023	—	—	—	—	—	—	—	—	—	—	Non-album singles
"Don't Call Me"	2023	—	—	—	—	—	—	—	—	—	—	Non-album singles
"Plastic Therapy"	2023	—	—	—	—	—	—	—	—	—	—	Non-album singles
"Now or Never" (with Martin Solveig)	2023	—	—	—	—	—	—	—	—	—	—	Back to Life
"La La La"	2023	—	—	—	—	—	—	—	—	—	—	Non-album singles
"IL0V3Y0U"	2023	—	—	—	—	—	—	—	—	—	—	Non-album singles
"Fur Elise"	2024	—	—	—	—	—	—	—	—	—	—	Non-album singles
"What a Woman"	2024	—	—	—	—	—	—	—	—	—	—	Non-album singles
"Ice"	2024	—	—	—	—	—	—	—	—	—	—	Non-album singles
"Porcelain"	2025	—	—	—	—	—	—	—	—	—	—	Film Noir
"Unethical"	2025	57	—	—	82	—	8	16	40	95	111	Film Noir
"Still Breathing" (with G.E.M and Illenium)	2025	—	—	—	—	—	—	—	—	—	—	Non-album single
"Peace & Violence"	2025	—	—	—	—	—	—	—	—	—	—	Film Noir
"Desert Rose"	2025	—	—	—	—	—	—	—	—	—	—	Film Noir
"Birthday"	2026	—	—	—	—	—	—	—	—	—	—	Film Noir (Fin)
"—" denotes a recording that did not chart or was not released in that territory.

==== As featured artist ====
Title	Year	Album
"I Dare You (كنتحداك)" (Kelly Clarkson featuring Faouzia)	2020	Non-album singles
"On My Way" (Sidepiece featuring Faouzia)	2023	Non-album singles

=== Other charted songs ===
Title	Year	Peak positions				Album
Title	Year	CAN Digital	FRA	SWI	US Dance	Album
"Battle" (David Guetta featuring Faouzia)	2018	38	—	80	26	7
"Money" (Ninho featuring Faouzia)	2019	—	12	—	—	Destin
"I Fly" (Galantis featuring Faouzia)	2020	—	—	—	29	Scoob! The Album
"—" denotes a recording that did not chart or was not released in that territory.

=== Guest appearances ===
Title	Year	Other artist(s)	Album
"Battle"	2018	David Guetta	7
"Money"	2019	Ninho	Destin
"I Fly"	2020	Galantis	Scoob! The Album
"Passing Memories (English Theme Song)"	2024	HOYO-MiX	Passing Memories (The Genshin Impact 4th Anniversary Theme Song EP)

=== Videography ===
Title	Year	Artist(s)	Director(s)	Ref.
"My Heart's Grave"	2017	Faouzia	Chaz	
"Bad Dreams (Stripped)"	2018	Faouzia	None credited	
"This Mountain"	2018	Faouzia	None credited	
"Exothermic (Piano Version)"	2019	Faouzia	None credited	
"Born Without A Heart (Stripped)"	2019	Faouzia	None credited	
"I'm Blue"	2019	Faouzia	None credited	
"You Don't Even Know Me"	2019	Faouzia	None credited	
"You Don't Even Know Me (Stripped)"	2019	Faouzia	None credited	
"Tears Of Gold"	2019	Faouzia	None credited	
"Tears Of Gold (Stripped)"	2020	Faouzia	None credited	
"This Road"	2020	Faouzia	None credited	
"Wake Me When It's Over"	2020	Faouzia	None credited	
"Secrets"	2020	Faouzia	None credited	
"How It All Works Out"	2020	Faouzia	None credited	
"How It All Works Out (Stripped)"	2020	Faouzia	None credited	
"100 Band-Aids (Stripped)"	2020	Faouzia	None credited	
"Born Without A Heart" (Visualizer)	2020	Faouzia	None credited	
"Minefields" (Lyric video)	2020	Faouzia & John Legend	None credited	
"Minefields"	2021	Faouzia & John Legend	Kyle Cogan	
"Don't Tell Me I'm Pretty"	2021	Faouzia	None credited	
"Hero"	2021	Faouzia	Ariel Michelle	
"Puppet" (Lyric video)	2021	Faouzia	None credited	
"Puppet"	2022	Faouzia	Kyle Cogan	
"Now or Never"	2023	Faouzia & Martin Solveig	Emile Moutaud	
"La La La" (Lyric video)	2023	Faouzia	None credited	
"IL0V3Y0U" (Lyric video)	2023	Faouzia	None credited	
"Fur Elise" (Lyric video)	2024	Faouzia	None credited	
"Fur Elise (Live Performance)"	2024	Faouzia	Omar G. Joseph DeSantis	
"Ice"	2024	Faouzia	Nosaj	
"Last Song" (Official Lyric video)	2025	Faouzia & Alan Walker	None credited	
"Porcelain"	2025	Faouzia	Taylor S. Ellis	
"Unethical"	2025	Faouzia	Andrew Hebert	
"Peace & Violence"	2025	Faouzia	Bobby Hannaford	

== Tours ==
=== Headlining ===
- Citizens Tour (2022)
- Film Noir Tour (2026)
