= HOYO-MiX =

Video game music team and studio

- Parent company: miHoYo
- Founded: 2011; 15 years ago
- Genre: Various
- Country of origin: China
- Location: Shanghai, China

HOYO-MiX is miHoYo's musical group and music studio that is primarily responsible for producing songs and soundtracks for various miHoYo games, including the Honkai series, Tears of Themis, and Genshin Impact. The studio is headed by Cai Jinhan, miHoYo's music director.

The music studio was founded after Cai Jinhan and his collaborators had their work using vocaloid songs acquired by miHoYo. Since officially forming in the early 2010s, the studio has produced soundtracks for miHoYo's games, releasing its first OST in 2014. While key figures like composer Chen Yu-Peng initially shaped the project's musical identity, HOYO-MiX evolved into a flexible team-based system even after Chen's departure. Beyond game music, the studio has collaborated with singers and orchestras worldwide such as the London Philharmonic and Tokyo Philharmonic Orchestras. Since 2021, HOYO-MiX has expanded into large-scale live and online concerts worldwide while also engaging in academic and industry initiatives like international digital music festivals. Its music has been received positively, with all but one of the awards it has received coming from its work on Genshin Impact.

Although HOYO-MiX consists of several groups of people working on different game projects, they are mostly credited as "HOYO-MiX" as a whole in their works on streaming platforms.

== History ==
In an interview with Shanghai Morning Post, Cai Jinhan mentioned that the name "HOYO-MiX" is actually "miHoYo" spelled backward, and "MiX" refers to audio mixing. In "HOYO-MiX," only the letter "i" is lowercase, symbolizing the individual, as "we both respect the individual and serve the collective, which is because we are the music department of miHoYo, and serving the product is essential."

In 2011, a Vocaloid music group called Hatsune Squadron (初音战队), consisting of Cai Jinhan, Zheng Xiaoyu (Zheng Yujie), and Xia Yihan, composed the theme song "Gradually Collapsing Hatsune Miku" (日渐崩溃的初音未来) for the manga Gradually Collapsing World (日渐崩坏的世界). (Note: Composed by Cai Jinhan, arranged by Zheng Xiaoyu, and lyrics by Xia Yihan. A vocal version of the song is titled Diva of Collapsing World (崩壊世界の歌姬, also localized as Honkai World Diva), performed by Mengjing Saya, along with the VOCALOID version.) The copyright for this song was later acquired by miHoYo, thus the three joined miHoYo to establish the "HOYO-MiX" studio. Cai Jinhan took on the role of HOYO-MiX leader while also serving as the music director for miHoYo.

The first OST album released by HOYO-MiX was Honkai World Diva - Guns Girl Z OST on November 11, 2014. Since then, they have produced numerous albums and singles, including over 20 albums for Genshin Impact alone. These albums feature a variety of tracks, such as regional music, boss themes, battle themes, character trailers, and event-specific tracks.

The members of each game's music team, including the producer (a.k.a. team leader), are not unchanged. After the establishment of the Genshin Impact project, Cai Jinhan invited Chen Yupeng to produce the original soundtrack for Genshin Impact. In June 2020, Chen Yupeng officially joined HOYO-MiX as the music producer for Genshin Impact. In the early stages of music production for Genshin Impact, Chen Yupeng was primarily responsible. As the game's world expanded to include the Inazuma region, other music composers such as Yuan Dimeng joined the creative process. For the Sumeru region, music production involved Zhao Xin, Jiang Yijun, and other music composers. By the time of the Fontaine region, HOYO-MiX had established a comprehensive creative system and completed music production in the absence of Chen Yupeng's involvement. On September 12, 2023, Chen Yupeng announced his departure from miHoYo and the HOYO-MiX team to continue pursuing his musical dreams; the music producer role is succeeded by Yuan Dimeng, who also came from Chen's studio. (Note: Yuan Dimeng had already been revealed as a "music producer" alongside Chen Yupeng early in the video "Travelers' Reverie" — Behind the Scenes of the Music of Sumeru.)

On December 12, 2021, miHoYo's HOYO-MiX and the Shanghai Conservatory of Music jointly hosted the 2021 Shanghai Conservatory of Music International Digital Music Festival. The event included activities such as a summit forum on game music creation and the finals of a game music competition, leading to the establishment of the "Digital Music Professional Alliance." Professor An Dong from the Shanghai Conservatory of Music, the artistic director of the Shanghai Conservatory of Music International Digital Music Festival, and a well-known composer, served as the director of the alliance. Cai Jinhan, the music director of miHoYo, served as the deputy director and deputy secretary-general. In March 2023, HOYO-MiX continued to host the second Shanghai Conservatory of Music International Digital Music Festival, upgrading the "Digital Music Professional Alliance" to the "Digital Music Audio Professional Committee."

=== Collaborations ===
In 2017, HOYO-MiX collaborated with Japanese pianist and singer Mika Kobayashi to release singles such as Girl Inside and Honkai World Diva. Within half a month of their release, these singles entered the NetEase Cloud Music charts, with the remixed version of the theme song "Honkai World Diva" also making it to the top 10. Since 2017, HOYO-MiX has collaborated with various singers, including Tia Ray, Cécilia Cara, Yang Yang, Jake Miller, Kosei Nishiyama, Jooyoung, Paolo Andrea Di Pietro and Aurora.

Starting from 2020, HOYO-MiX collaborated with the London Philharmonic Orchestra, the Shanghai Symphony Orchestra, the Tokyo Philharmonic Orchestra, and the London Symphony Orchestra to produce music for the game Genshin Impact and released multiple Genshin Impact original soundtracks.

=== Music performances ===
In an interview in April 2021, Chen Yupeng revealed his plan to organize "offline music-related activities, including concerts" in the future. Following this announcement, HOYO-MiX initiated a series of annual concerts, expanding their music performances to various countries. On October 3, 2021, HOYO-MiX hosted their first Genshin Impact symphony concert, "Genshin Concert 2021 'Melodies of an Endless Journey,'" featuring the world-renowned Belgian conductor Dirk Brossé, the Flanders Symphony Orchestra, and musicians from various countries, including the United States and South Korea. This would be the first of several such concerts over the years, with concerts featuring acts like Yang Yang and various philharmonic orchestras.

On August 27, 2022, HOYO-MiX held the Honkai Impact 3rd "Dreamy Euphony" online concert, featuring the Xi'an Symphony Orchestra and singers like Huang Ling, Huang Xiaoyun, Hanser, Mika Kobayashi, MARiA (GARNiDELiA), Ding Shuang, and more. On October 2, 2022, HOYO-MiX organized the Genshin Impact online concert "Genshin Concert 2022 'Melodies of an Endless Journey,'" in collaboration with the Hollywood Chamber Orchestra. Composer, arranger, and music producer Shiro Sagisu served as the music director, and conductor Eimear Noone conducted the performance.

On July 29, 2023, HOYO-MiX organized the Honkai Impact 3rd online concert "Forest Capriccio," utilizing virtual production (VP) and extended reality (XR) technologies. Guest performers included Mika Kobayashi, Hanser, Huang Ling, Sa Dingding, Axis Neptune, Chongqing Grand Theatre Philharmonic Children's Choir, and more. This concert also marked its first physical theater screening, held at the "Guangdian Huashan Cinema" in Taipei and the "K11 Musea" in Hong Kong.

In late 2023 to early 2024, HOYO-MiX organized the Genshin Impact global symphony concert tour "Genshin Concert Tour 'Melodies of an Endless Journey,'" performing in various cities including Shanghai, Beijing, Tianjin, Chongqing, Changsha, Wuhan, Singapore, Kuala Lumpur, Guadalajara, Boston, Los Angeles, Chicago, New York, Osaka, Yokohama, Seoul, London, and Düsseldorf. The performing orchestras include: Shanghai Philharmonic Orchestra, Shanghai Opera House Chorus, Sfuture Art Troupe, Metropolitan Festival Orchestra, Malaysian Philharmonic Orchestra, Jalisco Philharmonic Orchestra, Genshin Concert Orchestra, Tokyo Philharmonic Orchestra, and Arts Symphony Orchestra. Among them, the Genshin Concert Orchestra is a touring symphony orchestra co-organized by miHoYo, Sony Music Solutions, and AWR Music Productions. The first concert took place on September 29, 2023, at the Mercedes-Benz Cultural Center in Shanghai, and the final one took place on January 20, 2024, at the Mitsubishi Electric Halle in Düsseldorf, Germany. Italian singer and actor Paolo Andrea Di Pietro performed "Rhapsodia Roscida" and "Polumnia Omnia" at the shows in Osaka, Yokohama and Seoul. On December 22, 2023, HOYO-MiX organized the Genshin Impact online concert "Genshin Concert 2023 'Melodies of an Endless Journey' – Scenic Vistas," in collaboration with the London Philharmonic Orchestra with many international guest musicians. The online concert used XR and AR technology to reinterpret melodies from the game are familiar with but with a new audiovisual experience. Composer and arranger Yasunori Nishiki served as the music director, and conductor Robert Ziegler conducted the performance.

On May 1, 2024, HOYO-MiX hosted the "Star Rail Live 2024" concert in Shanghai Oriental Sports Center. The concert included songs and symphonic music performances of several tracks from Honkai: Star Rail. The concert was also livestreamed globally.

== Musical style and influences ==
=== Musical style ===
Former music producer of HOYO-MiX's Genshin Impact soundtrack, Chen Yupeng, expressed in an interview that the aim of the music is to touch the players and fully immerse them in the game world. "The music needs to have beautiful melodies, and it always sounds full of hope and passion. It brings out the poetic, beautiful and humanistic feelings within the listeners." The music producer of HOYO-MiX's Honkai: Star Rail soundtrack, Gong Qi, mentioned that the creation team places great emphasis on the combination of music and storyline. The purpose of the soundtrack's production is to enhance the narrative experience, making the gameplay more immersive, "like doing music design for an animated film." Manager of HOYO-MiX, Cai Jinhan, stated that each player's encounters and emotions during their journey are unique. "Making the music and the storyline complement each other, and accompany Trailblazers with just enough presence to witness this adventure into the stars, is our top priority in composition." In terms of character music, Cai Jinhan remarked that music is a new interpretation of characters, a process of re-creation, "to put it most simply, it is about 'purpose' and 'function.'" Additionally, to avoid auditory fatigue for players, the rhythm of most outdoor exploration music is very soothing and peaceful, and the duration is relatively short.

Genshin Impact chooses traditional orchestral music as its base, incorporating elements of world music on top of this foundation, and the music also adopts regional and cultural influences according to different areas in the game. Honkai: Star Rail selects a small orchestral ensemble to highlight the intricacy of melodies and the details in performance, while appropriately integrating electronic synthesizers and electronic percussion elements.

== Discography ==
(* denotes digital soundtracks that are yet to be released globally, with usually only a NetEase Cloud Music or QQ Music exclusive release in China or East Asia.)

=== Albums & Extended Plays ===
Release date	Name	Related Work	Composer(s)	Publish Format (Catalog Number)	Ref.
November 1, 2014	Houkai World Diva - Houkai Gakuen 2 OST (崩壞世界的歌姬 - 崩壞學園2 OST)	Guns Girl Z	Zheng Yujie, Cai Jinhan, TetraCalyx	Digital*	
August 12, 2016	Houkai World Diva Original Soundtrack (崩壊世界の歌姫 オリジナルサウンドトラック)	Guns Girl Z	Cai Jinhan	CD (MHY-001~2)	
April 13, 2017	Honkai Impact 3rd (Original Motion Picture Soundtrack)	Honkai Impact 3rd	Cai Jinhan, Zheng Yujie	Digital*	
May 2017	Eiportne (璀璨的三连星)	Guns Girl Z	Cai Jinhan, Zheng Yujie	CD	
January 19, 2018	Honkai Impact 3rd -Impact- Original Soundtrack	Honkai Impact 3rd	Cai Jinhan, Zheng Yujie	Digital*	
September 10, 2018	Houkai 3rd Original Soundtrack	Honkai Impact 3rd	Cai Jinhan	CD (MHY-001~2)	
December 21, 2018	Honkai Impact 3rd -Onwards- Original Soundtrack	Honkai Impact 3rd	Cai Jinhan, Gong Qi, Yin Chunqing, Zheng Yujie	Digital	
June 28, 2019	Cooking with Valkyries Original Soundtrack	Cooking with Valkyries (Honkai Impact 3rd)	Luna Safari	Digital*	
April 17, 2020	Honkai Impact 3rd -A Post-Honkai Odyssey- Original Soundtrack	Honkai Impact 3rd	Gong Qi, Li Jinghao	Digital	
June 19, 2020	Genshin Impact - The Wind and the Star Traveler	Genshin Impact	Chen Yupeng	Digital	
July 3, 2020	Honkai Impact 3rd -Review- Original Soundtrack	Honkai Impact 3rd	Cai Jinhan, Gong Qi, Wen Chi	Digital	
September 19, 2020	Cooking with Valkyries II Original Soundtrack	Cooking with Valkyries II (Honkai Impact 3rd)	Luna Safari	Digital	
September 28, 2020	Genshin Impact - City of Winds and Idylls	Genshin Impact	Chen Yupeng	Digital	
November 6, 2020	Genshin Impact - Jade Moon Upon a Sea of Clouds	Genshin Impact	Chen Yupeng	Digital	
February 4, 2021	Genshin Impact - The Stellar Moments	Genshin Impact	Chen Yupeng, Yuan Dimeng	Digital	
February 8, 2021	Honkai Impact 3rd -Yesterday- Original Soundtrack	Honkai Impact 3rd	Gong Qi, Wen Chi, Li Jinghao, Cui Wei	Digital	
February 9, 2021	Honkai Impact 3rd -Alive- Original Soundtrack	Honkai Impact 3rd	Wen Chi, Lin Yifan, Li Jinghao, Cui Wei, Gong Qi	Digital	
April 2, 2021	Genshin Impact - Vortex of Legends	Genshin Impact	Chen Yupeng	Digital	
May 13, 2021	Tears of Themis - Encounter	Tears of Themis	Cai Jinhan, Zheng Yujie, Yang Qixiang, Cui Wei, Yin Chunqing, Wang Anyu	Digital	
July 11, 2021	ELF Academy Original Soundtrack	ELF Academy (Honkai Impact 3rd)	Wen Chi	Digital	
July 19, 2021	Genshin Impact - The Shimmering Voyage	Genshin Impact	Chen Yupeng	Digital	
August 4, 2021	Genshin Impact - The Wind and the Star Traveler	Genshin Impact	Chen Yupeng	CD (C2-X20650)	
August 4, 2021	Genshin Impact - City of Winds and Idylls	Genshin Impact	Chen Yupeng	CD (C2-X20651)	
September 22, 2021	Genshin Impact - Realm of Tranquil Eternity	Genshin Impact	Chen Yupeng	Digital	
October 30, 2021	Honkai Impact 3rd CD OST - Trails of Comets	Honkai Impact 3rd	Cai Jinhan, Gong Qi, Wen Chi, Li Jinghao, Cui Wei, Lin Yifan	CD (C2-X21618)	
January 22, 2022	Genshin Concert - Melodies of an Endless Journey	Genshin Impact	Chen Yupeng	CD	
January 24, 2022	Tears of Themis - Promise	Tears of Themis	Yang Qixiang, Zheng Yujie	Digital	
January 26, 2022	Genshin Impact - The Stellar Moments Vol. 2	Genshin Impact	Chen Yupeng	Digital	
January 31, 2022	Genshin Impact - "Fleeting Colors in Flight"	Genshin Impact	Chen Yupeng, Yuan Dimeng, Ding Qian, Zhao Xin	Digital	
February 2, 2022	Honkai Impact 3rd -Paradox- Original Soundtrack	Honkai Impact 3rd	Wen Chi, Li Jinghao, Jiang Yijun, Chen Yonghui, Jiang Peng	Digital	
February 17, 2022	Honkai Impact 3rd -A Post-Honkai Odyssey 2- Original Soundtrack	Honkai Impact 3rd	Li Jinghao, Wen Chi	Digital	
April 13, 2022	Genshin Impact - Islands of the Lost and Forgotten	Genshin Impact	Chen Yupeng, Zhao Xin, Jiang Yijun, Ding Qian, Yuan Dimeng	Digital	
June 22, 2022	Genshin Impact - Millelith's Watch	Genshin Impact	Chen Yupeng, Jiang Yijun, Yuan Dimeng, Ding Qian, Zhao Xin	Digital	
July 27, 2022	Tears of Themis - With You	Tears of Themis	Kou Youyou, Yang Qixiang, Zheng Yujie, Cai Jinhan, Wang Anyu	Digital	
August 6, 2022	Honkai Impact 3rd -ELYSIUM- Original Soundtrack	Honkai Impact 3rd	Li Jinghao, Chen Yonghui, Wen Chi, Jiang Peng, Lin Yifan	Digital	
August 15, 2022	Genshin Impact - The Shimmering Voyage Vol.2	Genshin Impact	Chen Yupeng, Yuan Dimeng, Jiang Yijun, Zhao Xin, Ding Qian	Digital	
September 20, 2022	Genshin Impact - Footprints of the Traveler	Genshin Impact	Chen Yupeng, Yuan Dimeng, Zhao Xin, Jiang Yijun, Ding Qian	Digital	
October 20, 2022	Genshin Impact - Forest of Jnana and Vidya	Genshin Impact	Chen Yupeng, Jiang Yijun, Zhao Xin, Yuan Dimeng, Ding Qian	Digital	
January 10, 2023	Genshin Impact - The Stellar Moments Vol. 3	Genshin Impact	Chen Yupeng, Zhao Xin, Jiang Yijun, Ding Qian, Yuan Dimeng, You Peijia	Digital	
January 15, 2023	Golden Courtyard: New Year Wishes in Winter Original Soundtrack	Golden Courtyard: New Year Wishes in Winter (Honkai Impact 3rd)	Jiang Peng, Chen Yonghui	Digital	
January 19, 2023	Tears of Themis - Till the End	Tears of Themis	Kou Youyou, Yang Qixiang, Zheng Yujie	Digital	
February 9, 2023	Genshin Impact - Jade Moon Upon a Sea of Clouds	Genshin Impact	Chen Yupeng	CD (C2-X20651)	
February 9, 2023	Genshin Impact - Fleeting Colors in Flight	Genshin Impact	Chen Yupeng	CD (C2-X20651)	
February 24, 2023	Honkai Impact 3rd -The Day of Transcending Finality- Original Soundtrack	Honkai Impact 3rd	Li Jinghao, Chen Yonghui, Jiang Peng	Digital	
March 24, 2023	Honkai: Star Rail - Out of Control	Honkai: Star Rail	Lin Yifan, Wang Kexin, Gong Qi, Wen Chi	Digital	
April 19, 2023	Genshin Impact - The Unfathomable Sand Dunes	Genshin Impact	Ding Qian, Jiang Yijun, You Peijia, Zhao Xin, Yuan Dimeng, Arcangelo Chen, Che Ziyu, Chen Yupeng, Liu Yue	Digital	
May 2, 2023	Honkai: Star Rail - Of Snow and Ember	Honkai: Star Rail	Lin Yifan, Gong Qi, Xu Shengyi, Wang Yujue, Wen Chi, Cui Hanpu	Digital	
June 30, 2023	Genshin Impact - Footprints of the Traveler Vol. 2	Genshin Impact	Chen Yupeng, Jiang Yijun, Arcangelo Chen, You Peijia, Zhao Xin, Wang Yuxi, Ding Qian, Che Ziyu, Yuan Dimeng	Digital	
July 14, 2023	Honkai Impact 3rd -At the Fingertip of the Sea- Original Soundtrack	Honkai Impact 3rd	Jiang Peng, Chen Yonghui, Liu Jianuo, Li Jinghao	Digital	
July 20, 2023	Honkai: Star Rail - Svah Sanishyu	Honkai: Star Rail	Lin Yifan, Wang Yujue, Wang Kexin, Gong Qi, Wen Chi, Cui Hanpu, Cui Wei	Digital	
July 24, 2023	Tears of Themis - Belonging	Tears of Themis	Zheng Yujie, Kou Youyou, Gao Huan, Cui Wei, Yang Qixiang	Digital	
July 26, 2023	Genshin Impact - The Shimmering Voyage Vol.3	Genshin Impact	Yuan Dimeng, Arcangelo Chen, Ding Qian, Che Ziyu, You Peijia, Jiang Yijun, Zhao Xin, Wang Yuxi, Chen Yupeng, Liu Yue	Digital	
October 2, 2023	Genshin Impact - Fountain of Belleau	Genshin Impact	Yuan Dimeng, Jiang Yijun, Ding Qian, Arcangelo Chen, Che Ziyu, Zhao Xin, You Peijia, Chen Yupeng, Liu Yue, Wang Yuxi	Digital	
October 27, 2023	Honkai: Star Rail - Experience the Paths	Honkai: Star Rail	Wen Chi, Gong Qi, Lin Yifan, Wang Kexin, Cui Wei, Cui Hanpu, Shi Lei, Wang Yujue, Li Zhaoyang	Digital	
November 2023	The Stellar Moments: Shimmering Spotlight	Genshin Impact	Chen Yupeng, Yuan Dimeng, Zhao Xin	Vinyl (C2-X23612)	
January 2024	Love upon Wings in Your Heart	Tears of Themis	HOYO-MiX	Vinyl	
January 2024	Marvelous Moments	Tears of Themis	HOYO-MiX	Vinyl	
January 2024	Summers Past	Tears of Themis	HOYO-MiX	Vinyl	
January 5, 2024	Honkai Impact 3rd -Beyond the Stars- Original Soundtrack	Honkai Impact 3rd	Liu Jianuo, Chen Yonghui, Jiang Peng, Li Sihong	Digital	
January 12, 2024	Honkai: Star Rail - Astral Theater	Honkai: Star Rail	Wang Yujue, Lin Yifan, Wen Jing, Li Zhaoyang, Wang Kexin, Cui Hanpu, Gong Qi, Li Jinghao	Digital	
January 17, 2024	Genshin Impact - The Stellar Moments Vol. 4	Genshin Impact	Chen Yupeng, Zhao Xin, Ding Qian, Arcangelo Chen, You Peijia, Che Ziyu, Jiang Yijun, Yuan Dimeng, Lunan, Li Yang	Digital	
January 23, 2024	Guns Girl Z CHARACTER SONG Vol. 1	Guns Girl Z	Qi Inory, Zei In, Ling Yuan Yousa, Hanser, Pao Pao, Xiao N	Digital	
January 23, 2024	Guns Girl Z OST Vol. 1	Guns Girl Z	Chen Leyi, TetraCalyx, Hanser, Bubble, Marblue	Digital	
January 27, 2024	Honkai: Star Rail - WHITE NIGHT	Honkai: Star Rail	Wang Kexin	Digital	
February 2, 2024	Tears of Themis - By Your Side	Tears of Themis	Zheng Yujie, Gao Huan, Kou Youyou	Digital	
February 26, 2024	Genshin Impact - Pelagic Primaevality	Genshin Impact	Jiang Yijun, Che Ziyu, Ding Qian, Yuan Dimeng, Wang Yuxi, Arcangelo Chen, You Peijia, Zhao Xin, Lunan, June	Digital	
March 27, 2024	Genshin Impact - Jadeite Redolence	Genshin Impact	Yuxi Wang, Qian Ding, Yang Lee, Yijun Jiang, Arcangelo Chen, Lunan, Peijia You, Xin Zhao, Ziyu Che, Dimeng Yuan	Digital	
April 13, 2024	Honkai: Star Rail - Experience the Paths Vol. 2	Honkai: Star Rail	Wen Chi, Cui Hanpu, Wen Jing, Wandy.N, Wang Yujue, Zhang Jianan, Wang Kexin, Lin Yifan, Gong Qi	Digital	
May 9, 2024	Honkai: Star Rail - INSIDE	Honkai: Star Rail	Wang Kexin	Digital	
May 14, 2024	Genshin Impact - Cantus Aeternus	Genshin Impact	Wang Yuxi, Ding Qian, You Peijia, Arcangelo Chen, Jiang Yijun, Ziyu Che, Lunan, Yang Lee, Yuan Dimeng, Chen Yupeng	Digital	
May 30, 2024	Honkai Impact 3rd -Tides of Time Gone By- Original Soundtrack	Honkai Impact 3rd	Jiang Peng, Liu Jianuo, Chen Yonghui, SifuLee, Cai Chengyu	Digital	
May 31, 2024	Honkai: Star Rail - The Flapper Sinthome (Part 1)	Honkai: Star Rail	Wang Kexin, Wen Jing, Lin Yifan, Wang Yujue, Gong Qi, Cui Hanpu, Laetus.L	Digital	
June 21, 2024	Honkai: Star Rail - The Flapper Sinthome (Part 2)	Honkai: Star Rail	Wang Kexin, Wen Jing, Lin Yifan, Wang Yujue, Gong Qi, Cui Hanpu, Wandy.N, Shengyi Xu, Jinghao Li	Digital	
June 28, 2024	Zenless Zone Zero - Loading... (Note: Collaborate with Sān-Z Studio, miHoYo's new label that is responsible for the soundtrack production of Zenless Zone Zero.)	Zenless Zone Zero	Yang Wutao, Lei Sheng, Zhou Bin, Song Peiyan	Digital	
July 24, 2024	Tears of Themis - Ever Since	Tears of Themis	Zheng Yujie, Gao Huan, Yin Zhaoqing, Yang Qixiang	Digital	
July 31, 2024	Genshin Impact - The Shimmering Voyage Vol. 4	Genshin Impact	Wang Yuxi, Ding Qian, Arcangelo Chen, Jiang Yijun, Ziyu Che, Lunan, Yang Lee, Yuan Dimeng, Liu Yue, Chen Yupeng, Xin Zhao	Digital	
August 9, 2024	Genshin Impact - Footprints of the Traveler Vol. 3	Genshin Impact	You Peijia, Wang Yuxi, Arcangelo Chen, Jiang Yijun, Lunan, Yang Lee, Yuan Dimeng, Chen Yupeng, Xin Zhao	Digital	
September 27, 2024	Honkai: Star Rail - Experience the Paths Vol. 3	Honkai: Star Rail	Wen Chi, Zhang Jianan, Wandy.N, Wang Kexin, Cui Hanpu, Lin Yifan, Wang Yuqiu, Wen Jing	Digital	
October 5, 2024	Genshin Impact – Land of Tleyaoyotl	Genshin Impact	Dimeng Yuan, Yijun Jiang, Yuxi Wang, Yang Lee, Qian Ding, Peijia You, Lunan, Ziyu Che, Xin Zhao, Arcangelo Chen	Digital	
November 15, 2024	Honkai: Star Rail - Astral Theater Vol. 2	Honkai: Star Rail	Cui Hanpu, Wandy.N, Wen Jing, Wang Kexin, Wang Yuqiu, Lin Yifan, Zhang Jianan	Digital	
December 16, 2024	Genshin Impact – Eternal Sun, Eternal Want	Genshin Impact	Ziyu Che, Yuxi Wang, Arcangelo Chen, Yang Lee, Lunan, Xin Zhao, Peijia You, Qian Ding, Yijun Jiang, Dimeng Yuan	Digital	
December 23, 2024	Zenless Zone Zero - Hyper Commission	Zenless Zone Zero	Yang Wutao, Zhou Bin, Song Peiyan, Lei Sheng, Yu Zongru, Philip Strand	Digital	
December 26, 2024	Honkai Impact 3rd -Dreams and Laments of the Forgotten Stars- Original Soundtrack	Honkai Impact 3rd	Raven Rossignol, Chen Yonghui, Li Sihong, Jiang Peng, Wu Weiye	Digital	
January 2025	Honkai Impact 3rd CD OST - The Moon's Origin and Family	Honkai Impact 3rd	Wen Chi, Li Jinghao, Jiang Yijun, Chen Yonghui, Jiang Peng, Lin Yifan, Raven Rossignol, Li Sihong	CD	
January 7, 2025	Zenless Zone Zero: Hyper Commission - PV Soundtrack	Zenless Zone Zero	Yang Wutao, Lei Sheng, Zhou Bin, Song Peiyan	Digital	
January 15, 2025	Genshin Impact – The Stellar Moments Vol. 5	Genshin Impact	Peijia You, Arcangelo Chen, Yijun Jiang, Lunan, Yang Lee, Xin Zhao, Dimeng Yuan, Ziyu Che	Digital	
January 23, 2025	Tears of Themis - Captive Hearts	Tears of Themis	Zheng Xiaoyu, Gao Huan, Kou Youyou	Digital	
February 12, 2025	Genshin Impact - Azure Lantern, Jade Inkstone	Genshin Impact	Che Ziyu, Chen Zimin	Digital	
February 15, 2025	Honkai: Star Rail - Allegory of the Cave (Part 1)	Honkai: Star Rail	Lin Yifan, Wang Kexin, Wang Yuqiu, Wandy.N, Camille Saint-Saëns, Wen Chi, Wen Jing	Digital	
April 2025	Honkai Impact 3rd OST - Graduation Trip Original Sound Track	Honkai Impact 3rd	Cai Jinhan, TetraCalyx, Wen Chi, Lin Yifan, Jiang Peng, Chen Yonghui	Vinyl	
April 18, 2025	Honkai: Star Rail - Experience the Paths Vol. 4	Honkai: Star Rail	Cui Hanpu, Wang Kexin, Wen Jing, Zhang Jianan, Wandy.N, Wen Chi, Eva Zuo, Yu Shijia	Digital	
April 30, 2025	Genshin Impact – Radiance Aflame	Genshin Impact	Ziyu Che, Arcangelo Chen, Xin Zhao, Peijia You, Yuxi Wang, Qian Ding, Dimeng Yuan, Yang Lee, Yijun Jiang, Lunan, Linyao Feng, June, Deer Suo	Digital	
May 24, 2025	Honkai: Star Rail - Allegory of the Cave (Part 2)	Honkai: Star Rail	Wang Yuqiu, Yu Shijia, Liu Zheng, Wang Kexin, Wen Jing, Wandy.N, Lin Yifan, Huang Aolin, Shen Mengyin, Zhang Jianan	Digital	
July 25, 2025	Genshin Impact - Footprints of the Traveler, Vol. 4	Genshin Impact	Peijia You, Lunan, Yijun Jiang, Yuxi Wang, Yang Lee, Dimeng Yuan, Deer Suo, Xin Zhao, Linyao Feng	Digital	
July 30, 2025	Tears of Themis - Only You in This Life (今生唯你)	Tears of Themis	Zheng Yujie, Li Shaojia, Gao Huan	Digital*	
August 13, 2025	Genshin Impact - The Shimmering Voyage Vol. 5	Genshin Impact	Yang Lee, Deer Suo, Arcangelo Chen, Yuxi Wang, Zhenlan Kang	Digital	
October 11, 2025	Honkai Impact 3rd -Stars Inscribed Upon Open Skies- Original Soundtrack	Honkai Impact 3rd	Wu Weiye, Chen Yonghui, Li Sihong, Jiang Peng	Digital	
October 16, 2025	Genshin Impact - Outside It Is Growing Dark	Genshin Impact	Yang Lee, Yuxi Wang, Peijia You, Yijun Jiang, Arcangelo Chen, Ziyu Che, Lunan, Deer Suo, Linyao Feng, Xin Zhao, Caroline Luo	Digital	
November 14, 2025	Honkai: Star Rail - Allegory of the Cave (Part 3)	Honkai: Star Rail	Cui Hanpu, Wen Jing, Wang Yuqiu, Huang Aolin, Lin Yifan, Zhang Jianan, Wen Chi, Wang Kexin	Digital	
December 27, 2025	Honkai: Star Rail - Experience the Paths Vol. 5	Honkai: Star Rail	Eva Zuo, Wen Jing, Zhang Jianan, Yu Shijia, Wandy.N, Cui Hanpu, Wang Kexin, Lin Yifan, Jiang Shaohan	Digital	
January 5, 2026	Zenless Zone Zero: Hyper Commission 2.0	Zenless Zone Zero	Lei Sheng, Zhou Bin, Song Peiyan, Yang Wutao, Yu Zongru, Zhang Yichi, Chen Jiahao, Wang Mingji	Digital*	
January 21, 2026	Genshin Impact - The Stellar Moments Vol. 6	Genshin Impact	Wu Zhenghao, Chen Zimin, Xin Zhao, Feng Linyao, Jiang Yijun, You Peijia, Lee Yang, Caroline Luo, Wang Yuxi, Suo De'er	Digital	
January 20, 2026	Zenless Zone Zero: Hyper Commission 2.0: PV Soundtrack	Zenless Zone Zero	Yu Zongru, Zhou Bin, Yang Wutao, Song Peiyan, Mingji Wang, Lei Sheng	Digital*	
January 25, 2026	Honkai: Star Rail - Astral Theater Vol. 3	Honkai: Star Rail	Liu Zheng, Huang Aolin, Wang Yuqiu, Wandy.N, Wang Kexin, Chen Yonghui, Jiang Shaohan	Digital	
February 7, 2026	Genshin Impact - When Lanterns Echo the Moon	Genshin Impact	Zhao Xin, Mofang, Lunan, Li Yang, Chen Zimin	Digital	

=== Singles ===
Release Date	Name	Related Work	Singer(s)	Composer(s)	Lyricist(s)	Publish Format	Ref.
March 6, 2018	Feather of Aeons (千年の羽)	Honkai Impact 3rd	Mika Kobayashi	Cai Jinhan	Xia Yihan	Digital	
July 10, 2019	Cyberangel	Honkai Impact 3rd	Hanser	Cai Jinhan	Yin Chunqing, Applebeetle	Digital	
October 12, 2019	Dual-Ego	Honkai Impact 3rd	Sa Dingding	Cai Jinhan	TetraCalyx	Digital	
February 28, 2020	Starfall	Honkai Impact 3rd	Tia Ray	Cai Jinhan	TetraCalyx	Digital	
July 10, 2020	Hidden Heart	Guns Girl Z	Hanser	Zheng Yujie	Yin Chunqing	Digital*	
July 29, 2020	Indeterminate Fate (未定的注定)	Tears of Themis	Hu Xia	Zheng Yujie	Gong Jiacheng	Digital	
September 19, 2020	Incarnation	Guns Girl Z	Weep Clouds (雲の泣)	Zheng Yujie	Yin Chunqing	Digital*	
January 29, 2021	Rubia	Honkai Impact 3rd	Zhou Shen	Cai Jinhan	TetraCalyx	Digital	
July 9, 2021	Moon Halo	Honkai Impact 3rd	Chalili, TetraCalyx, Hanser	Cai Jinhan, TetraCalyx	TetraCalyx	Digital	
October 6, 2021	Oracle	Honkai Impact 3rd	Huang Xiaoyun	Wen Chi	TetraCalyx	Digital	
January 21, 2022	Regression	Honkai Impact 3rd	Ayanga	Lin Yifan	TetraCalyx	Digital	
August 12, 2022	TruE	Honkai Impact 3rd	Huang Ling	Wen Chi	TetraCalyx	Digital	
November 10, 2022	Cheer Up	Guns Girl Z	Yanning	Zheng Yujie	Jagger	Digital*	
March 3, 2023	Da Capo	Honkai Impact 3rd	Che Ziyu	Cai Jinhan	TetraCalyx	Digital	
April 25, 2023	Interstellar Journey	Honkai: Star Rail	Chalili, Lea Sirk	Wang Kexin, Yuan Dimeng	Wangren Bushi (往人不识), Oil Li	Digital	
April 26, 2023	Take the Journey	Honkai: Star Rail	Anthony Lynch	Lin Yifan	Lin Yifan	Digital	
July 20, 2023	Where the Heart Belongs	Tears of Themis	Shye	Kou Youyou	Oil Li	Digital	
November 13, 2023	La vaguelette	Genshin Impact	Cécilia Cara	Yuan Dimeng	Hani, Hsiang Liu, Bao	Digital	
November 14, 2023	La vaguelette	Genshin Impact	Shang Wenjie	Yuan Dimeng	Hani, Hsiang Liu, Bao	Digital*	
November 14, 2023	La vaguelette	Genshin Impact	Hu Xia	Yuan Dimeng	Hani, Hsiang Liu, Bao	Digital*	
November 15, 2023	La vaguelette	Genshin Impact	Tan Weiwei	Yuan Dimeng	Hani, Hsiang Liu, Bao	Digital*	
November 15, 2023	La vaguelette	Genshin Impact	Ayanga	Yuan Dimeng	Hani, Hsiang Liu, Bao	Digital	
January 30, 2024	No Ceiling	Honkai Impact 3rd	BRAINFREEZE	Jiang Peng, BRAINFREEZE	BRAINFREEZE	Digital	
February 9, 2024	Before Setting Out (Note: Released in China as Journey Crisis! The St. Freya Special Event Original Soundtrack.)	Journey Crisis! The St. Freya Special Event (Honkai Impact 3rd)	Tao Dian, Hanser, Ju Huahua	Liu Jianuo	Hanser	Digital	
April 18, 2024	Emberfire	Genshin Impact	Curley G	Li Yang	Bao, Hsiang Liu	Digital	
May 25, 2024	The Road Not Taken	Genshin Impact	Aimer	Ziyu Che	Bao, Ziyu Che, Spela Gorogranc - Shana	Digital	
June 19, 2024	Had I Not Seen the Sun	Honkai: Star Rail	Chevy	Wang Kexin	Ruby Qu	Digital	
June 29, 2024	Come Alive	Zenless Zone Zero	Philip Strand, Lei Sheng	Philip Strand, Lei Sheng	Philip Strand, Lei Sheng	Digital	
July 6, 2024	BITE!	Zenless Zone Zero	Lei Yuxin	Lei Sheng	Jacob Crooked, Peter Sierzput	Digital	
July 26, 2024	As the sugar cube floats, fleeting in time	Zenless Zone Zero	Alan Dawa Dolma	Yang Wutao	Cream Kumako	Digital	
August 14, 2024	Crimson Pierces the Twilight	Zenless Zone Zero	Vanessa Kim	Yang Wutao	Monusky	Digital	
September 26, 2024	pinKing	Zenless Zone Zero	ChiliChill	ChiliChill	ChiliChill, SL	Digital	
September 28, 2024	Passing Memories	Genshin Impact	Jason Zhang, Mika Nakashima, Faouzia	Yang Lee	Chen Li, Takuro Inoue, Zhou Jingyi, Bao	Digital	
October 18, 2024	Burning Desires	Zenless Zone Zero	MES	Yang Wutao	SL	Digital	
October 21, 2024	Zenless Zone Zero 2024 Mix Hyper Commission	Zenless Zone Zero	Mr.mo, Sanjidao, Lei Sheng, DEVMO, Nyanners	Yang Wutao, Song Peiyan, Lei Sheng, Zhou Bin	Lei Shiyi, Lei Sheng, Peter Sierzput, Yang Wutao	Digital	
October 22, 2024	No Dazzle, No Break	Honkai: Star Rail	Reol	Cui Hanpu	AzureHead, Shota Horie	Digital	
November 8, 2024	Rest Awhile	Zenless Zone Zero	Rihona Kato	Yang Wutao	Hana Fujita	Digital	
November 28, 2024	Fearless	Zenless Zone Zero	YMIR	Zhou Bin, YMIR	YMIR	Digital	
December 19, 2024	Daybreak	Zenless Zone Zero	Shion Tsuji	Lei Sheng	HANA FUJITA	Digital	
December 20, 2024	Picture Book	Zenless Zone Zero	Shoohey	Yang Wutao	HANA FUJITA	Digital	
January 1, 2025	Blazing Heart	Genshin Impact	Tia Ray, Chrissy Costanza, Mikako Komatsu, Miyeon	Yuan Dimeng	Bao, Jonathan Wildman, Izuna Amanosaki, Wu Yueshun, Han Jaehyung	Digital	
January 2, 2025	Nameless Faces	Honkai: Star Rail	Lilas Ikuta, Tan Jing	Wang Kexin	Ruby Qu, Li Qi	Digital	
January 17, 2025	Resonance	Tears of Themis	Xia Yan, Zuo Ran, Mo Yi, Lu Jinghe	Zheng Yujie	Oil Li	Digital	
January 23, 2025	Stars of Lyra+	Zenless Zone Zero	Yu Zibei	Yang Wutao, Yu Zibei	Yang Wutao, Yu Zibei, Lei Shiyi	Digital	
February 14, 2025	Stars Align	Zenless Zone Zero	Yu Zibei, Ai Mori	Lei Sheng	Lei Yuxin	Digital	
April 1, 2025	Shining Promise in the Sky of Dawn	Zenless Zone Zero	Daisuke Hasegawa	Yang Wutao	Kentaro Sonoda	Digital	
April 27, 2025	On the Journey	Honkai: Star Rail	Vision Wei, Nea	Wang Kexin	Ruby Qu	Digital	
May 14, 2025	My Curse, My Fate	Zenless Zone Zero	(unannounced)	Caroline Luo, Cai Yichen, SmileL	Audrey Abebsi, Jinxiu, Riz, Sarah Sophia Erchoff, SmileL, Yuxin Z	Digital	
May 31, 2025	Almost	Zenless Zone Zero	Juno Su	Yang Wutao	Lei Shiyi	Digital	
June 13, 2025	Star Odyssey	Genshin Impact	Airi Suzuki	Yang Lee	Hsiang Liu	Digital	
June 23, 2025	Through food, we learn the world so wide, to train the heart, the self inside	Zenless Zone Zero	hanser	Yang Wutao	Yousa Ling	Digital	
July 3, 2025	Flares of the Blazing Sun	Honkai: Star Rail	YMIR	Wang Kexin, Gong Qi	Ruby Qu, Wang Kexin, YMIR	Digital	
July 15, 2025	Wonderland Trickery	Zenless Zone Zero	Ikumi Hasegawa	Lei Sheng	Mes, Ryao	Digital	
September 19, 2025	FURYON	Zenless Zone Zero	Alaina Cross	Zhou Bin	Alaina Cross	Digital	
September 28, 2025	The Long Way Home	Genshin Impact	Miao Jiang, Erika Harlacher	You Peijia	Woods, Jonathan Mark Wildman	Digital	
October 16, 2025	DAMIDAMI	Zenless Zone Zero	Aylin Abbasova	Sihan	Lyla P., Sihan, Nellie Fors, SmileL, Nanyan, Li Zilan	Digital	
November 6, 2025	Ripples of Past Reverie	Honkai: Star Rail	Angela Zhang, Cassie Wei	Cui Hanpu	Shaoji, KBShinya, Lu Tangshu, windflowerLia	Digital	
December 18, 2025	I Ask	Zenless Zone Zero	Taiga	Song Peiyan, Taiga	Lei Shiyi	Digital	
December 26, 2025	Tiny Giant	Zenless Zone Zero	Ashley Alisha	Zhou Bin	Ashley Alisha, Zhou Bin	Digital	
December 28, 2025	A Thousand First Meetings	Zenless Zone Zero	Jane Huang	Lei Sheng	Lei Sheng	Digital	
January 24, 2026	ReDreaming Angel	Zenless Zone Zero	Ayi, Cuishubing, Peipei, BPM15Q, 4s4ki	Yu Zongru	Xiongzi, 4s4ki, OHTORA	Digital*	
January 26, 2026	Turn Heartbeats Into Tempo	Zenless Zone Zero	Ayi, Cuishubing, Peipei	Yang Wutao, Song Peiyan	Lei Shiyi	Digital*	

== Reception and awards ==
=== Reception ===
HOYO-MiX's game music has received widespread positive reviews. Game Grape states that the character music in Genshin Impact brings aural "recognition," with each character's music attempting to create a unique soundtrack system that represents that character alone. The game's music not only possesses "purpose" and "functionality" but also has the "narrative ability" to tell the story of the characters. IGN reviews praise that in Genshin Impact, "the sights and sounds of this world are still a joy to behold, with breathtaking vistas around every corner and a memorable soundtrack to back them up." Stefania Netti from Eurogamer Italy regards the musical framework of Genshin Impact as "praiseworthy" and likens it to some of the music from the Final Fantasy series, such as Nobuo Uematsu's Prelude and To Zanarkand. Zackerie Fairfax from Screen Rant believes that "Teyvat is brought to life by Genshin Impact's beautiful soundtrack." "The orchestrated score celebrates the environment and seamlessly changes its tune depending on the setting which makes for some of the most memorable melodies." A Gaming Bolt reviewer finds the excellent orchestral works and electronic music tracks in Honkai: Star Rail captivating. Francesco Corica from Spazio Games praises the quality of the soundtrack in Honkai: Star Rail, noting that the music for each plot segment leaves a lasting impression. Eurogamer's reviewer Jessica Orr applauds the music of Honkai: Star Rail for creating an immersive atmosphere, providing pleasant piano melodies, gentle chants, and lively electronic beats that correspond to different in-game scenes. Marco Wutz from GLHF on Sports Illustrated states that the environmental music and battle tracks of Honkai: Star Rail have been lingering in their mind, making it unforgettable.

HOYO-MiX's works have consistently ranked high on the ACG charts. On bilibili, the Genshin Impact online concert "Melodies of an Endless Journey" had over 3 million views. On YouTube, the concert had over 4 million views. Songs e.g. "Liyue", "Contemplation in Snow", and "Rapid as Wildfires" from Genshin Impact were included in the music library of the 2022 Beijing Winter Olympics.

Several vocal tracks composed by HOYO-MiX have garnered widespread attention and appreciation. The game music "Devastation and Redemption" also known in cutscene as "The Divine Damsel of Devastation", composed by HOYO-MiX and performed by Yang Yang, an opera singer from the Shanghai Peking Opera Company, had over 15 million views within half a month of its release, attracting artists from various genres within the opera community for covers and adaptations. Eurogamer commentator Jessica Orr praised HOYO-MiX's collaboration with pop punk singer Jonathan Steingard on the Honkai: Star Rail battle track "Wildfire" for being pop rock yet endlessly listenable. HOYO-MiX's traditional Chinese-style vocal song "Samudrartha" for Honkai: Star Rail reached the top three on the bilibili charts on the day of its release, and achieved 8 million plays within a month on bilibili, with 3.64 million plays on YouTube. In addition to the single's spread, various covers and re-creations of the song are also widespread across the internet. The Beijing News praised it, saying "the shocking music, combined with the impactful visuals, captivates both gamers and music enthusiasts." In the 2021 Weibo Game Awards, the impression song "Rubia" for Honkai Impact 3rd, sung by Zhou Shen, won the Best Game Music of 2021.

=== Awards ===
Year	Recipient	Award	Result	Ref.
2020	Genshin Impact	BIGC Award for Excellent Game Music of the Year	Won	
2020	Genshin Impact	GIAC Award for Excellent Game Music	Won	
2021	The Wind and The Star Traveler (Genshin Impact)	PlayStation Game Music Award	2nd place	
2021	Jade Moon Upon a Sea of Clouds (Genshin Impact)	CMIC Music Award for Best Score Soundtrack for Video Game	Won	
2022	Genshin Impact	GIAC Award for Excellent Game Music Design	Nominated	
2023	The Shimmering Voyage Vol. 2 (Genshin Impact)	TMEA Award for Best Game Music Album	Won	
2024	Fountain of Belleau (Genshin Impact)	PlayStation Game Music Award	2nd place	
2024	The Flapper Sinthome (Honkai: Star Rail)	PlayStation Game Music Award	4th place	
