= Wannian Temple (Mount Emei) =

Buddhist temple on Mount Emei in Sichuan, China

- 万年寺
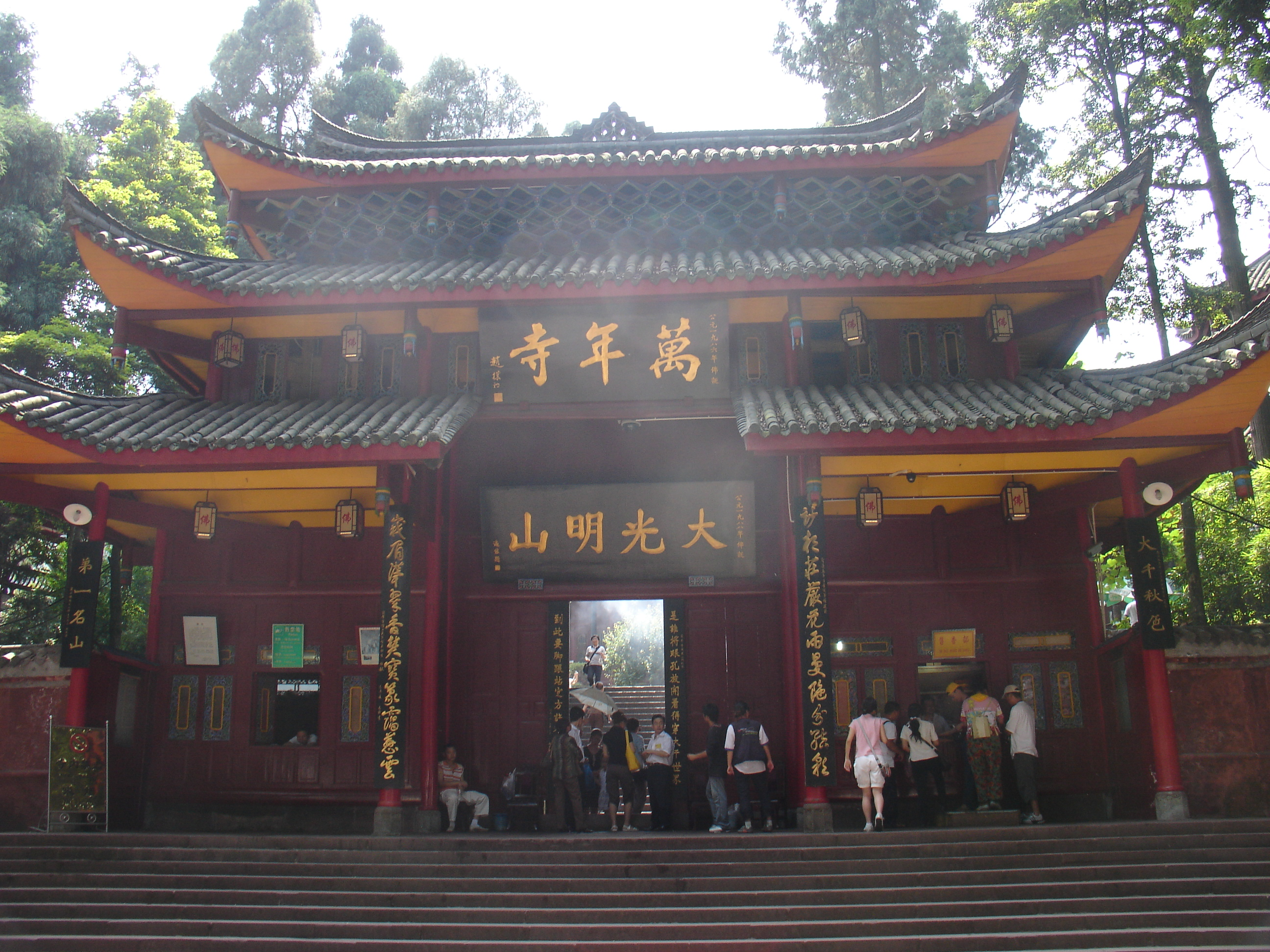
- The shanmen at Wannian Temple.

- Location within Sichuan

Religion
- Affiliation: Buddhism
- Sect: Chan Buddhism

Location
- Location: Mount Emei, Emeishan City, Sichuan
- Country: China
- Interactive map of Wannian Temple
- Coordinates: 29°35′04″N 103°23′27″E

Architecture
- Style: Chinese architecture
- Founder: Huichi (慧持)
- Established: 397–401
- Completed: 1954 (reconstruction)

Wannian Temple (simplified Chinese: 万年寺; traditional Chinese: 萬年寺; pinyin: Wànnián Sì; lit. 'Ten Thousand Year Temple') is a Buddhist temple located at the foot of Camel Mountain Range of Mount Emei, in Emeishan City, Sichuan, China. It is one of the six earliest Buddhist temples on Mount Emei. The temple is situated at the foot of Camel Mountain Range, facing the Daping Temple (大坪寺; 'Flat Ground Temple'), Niuxin Temple (牛心寺; 'Cattle Heart Temple'), Shisun Summit (石笋峰; 'Stalagmite Summit') and Bomeng Summit (钵孟峰) in the front. Wannian Temple is known not only for the bronze statue of Samantabhadra, but also for the Beamless Brick Hall.

== History ==
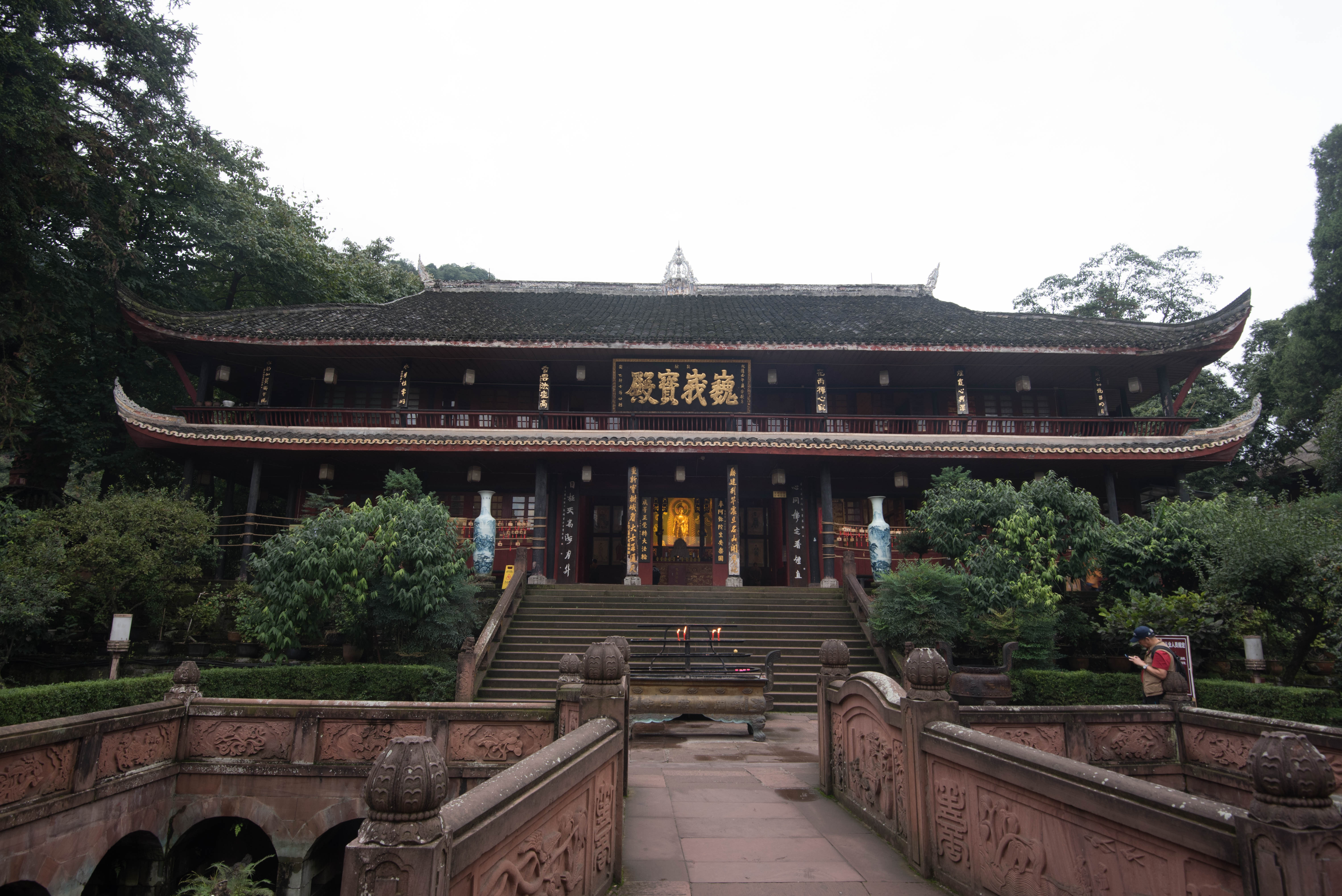
The Majestic Hall (巍峨宝殿) at Wannian Temple.

=== East Jin and Tang dynasties ===
Wannian Temple was first established by Huichi (慧持) in the East Jin dynasty (266–420), it was called "Puxian Temple" (普贤寺; 'Samantabhadra Temple') originally and changed to "Baishui Temple" (白水寺; 'White Water Temple') when it was reconstructed by Huitong (慧通) in 876 in the 3rd year of Qianfu period of the Tang dynasty (618–907). In the Kaiyuan period (713–741) of Emperor Xuanzong, poet Li Bai stayed in the Pilu Hall (毗卢殿) and wrote many poems while listening to the music played by Guangjun (广浚).

=== Northern Song dynasty ===
In 980, in the reign of Emperor Taizong in the Northern Song dynasty (960–1127), Maozhen (茂真) restored the temple and cast a bronze statue of Samantabhadra in the temple. The temple was renamed "Baishui Puxian Temple" (白水普贤寺; 'White Water Samantabhadra Temple').

=== Ming dynasty ===
In 1535, in the Jiajing era of the Ming dynasty (1368–1644), Biechuan (别传) made three statues of Buddha in the temple. Destroyed by a large fire in the Wanli period (1573–1620), it was rebuilt by monks under the order of Wanli Emperor in 1601. And the Beamless Brick Hall (无梁砖殿) was added to the temple with a plaque inscribed by Wanli Emperor with Chinese characters of "Shengshou Wannian Temple" (圣寿万年寺; 'Temple of Longevity').

=== Qing dynasty ===
In the fall when Mount Emei enjoys the best weather, the mount is decorated with colorful maple and ginkgo trees reflected on the green water lake. This poetic scenery was called "White Water in the Wind of Fall" (白水秋风) and acclaimed one of the ten best sceneries in Mount Emei by Qing dynasty scholar Tan Zhongyue (谭钟岳).

=== Republic of China ===
In 1946, the temple was completely destroyed with only the Beamless Brick Hall remaining.

=== People's Republic of China ===
After the founding of the PRC, the local government rebuilt the temple.

In the 1950s and 1960s, Zhu De, Chen Yi and He Long visited the temple successively. On July 8, 1980, Deng Xiaoping visited the temple and lived one night. In 1983, Wannian Temple was designated as a National Key Buddhist Temple in Han Chinese Area by the State Council of China. In 1986, the Shanmen, Hall of Maitreya, Hall of Pilu and Bore Hall (般若殿) were added to the temple. And the Drum Tower, Bell Tower and corridors were erected in 1991.

== Architecture ==
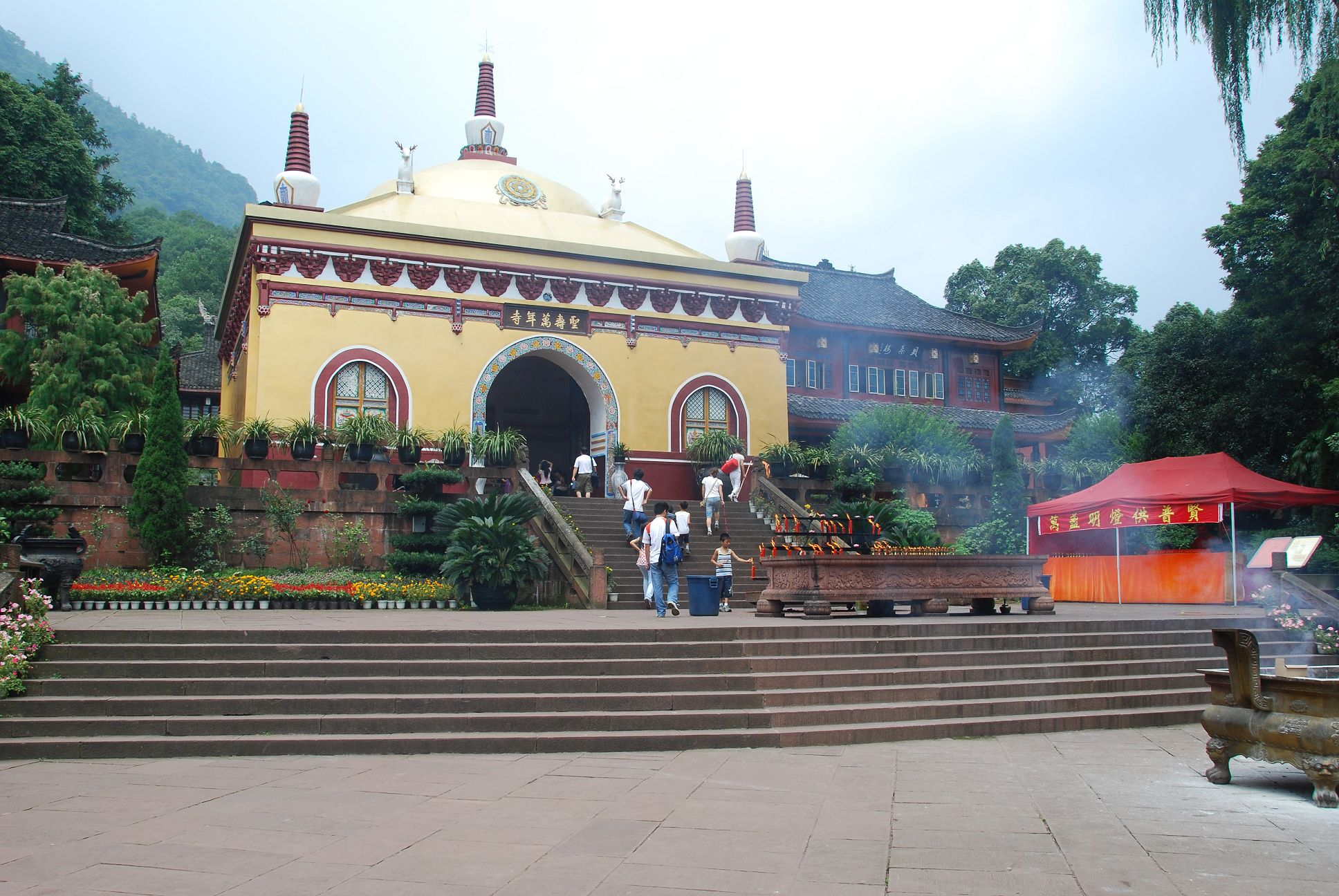
The Beamless Brick Hall at Wannian Temple.

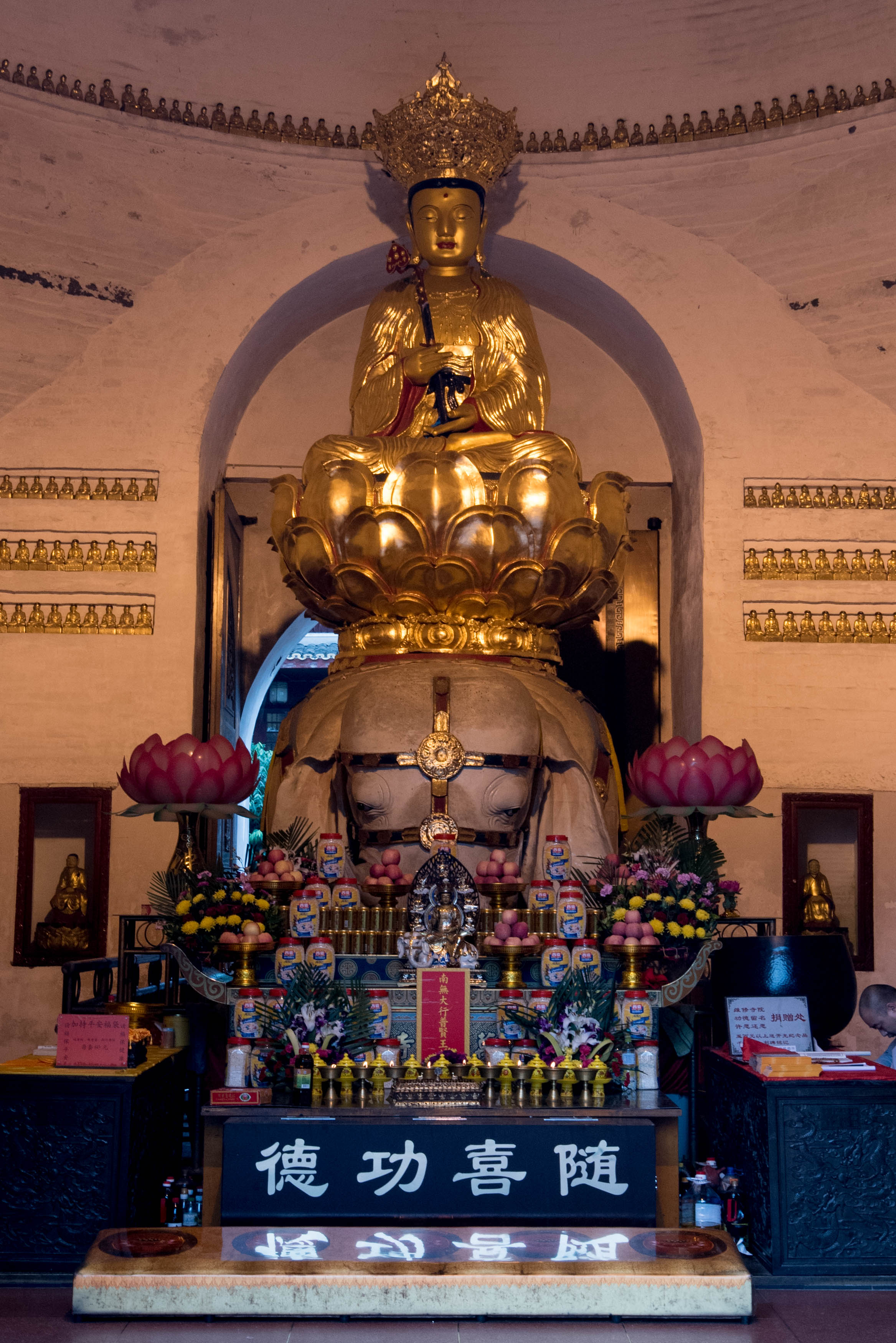
Statue of Samantabhadra.

Wannian Temple faces the west with the Shanmen, Hall of Maitreya, Beamless Brick Hall, Majestic Hall (巍峨宝殿), Mahavira Hall, and the Buddhist Texts Library along the central axis of the complex.

=== Beamless Brick Hall ===
The Beamless Brick Hall was built in 1600 by Wanli Emperor to congratulate the birthday of his mother. It is 17.12 metres (56.2 ft) high, 15.79 metres (51.8 ft) wide and 16.06 metres (52.7 ft) long. Inspired by techniques and styles of India and Myanmar with not a single piece of wood was used. Walls of the hall are decorated with patterns of wood-like structures like circular arches, vertical columns, window lattices, etc. On the dome there are five white pagodas and statues of four auspicious animals. With the ancient style, the walls of dome were carved with small statues of Buddha, which were called "Thousand Buddha Worshiping Samantabhadra" (千佛朝普贤).

A bronze statue of Samantabhadra riding a white elephant is placed under the dome. It is 7.35 metres (24.1 ft) high and 62,000 metres (203,000 ft) in weight. The statue was cast in 980, during the 5th year of Taiping Xingguo period of the Northern Song dynasty (960–1127). Sitting on the lotus throne, Samantabhadra wears a golden crown on the head and holds a Ruyi, his mount is also standing on four lotus platforms.

=== Xingyuan Hall ===
Behind the Beanless Brick Hall is the Xingyuan Hall (行愿楼) housing three national treasures: the Wanli Golden Seal (万历金印), tooth relic of the Buddha (佛牙) and palm leaf manuscript (贝叶经). The Wanli Golden Seal was cast in 1600 and presented by Empress Cixiaoxian. According to the Annals of Mount Emei (《峨眉山志》), the palm leaf manuscript was presented by the King of Myanmar in the mid-16th century, namely the Jiajing period (1522–1566) of the Ming dynasty (1368–1644).
