= Xixiang Chi =

Buddhist temple on Mount Emei in Sichuan, China

Coordinates: 29°33′13″N 103°20′38″E

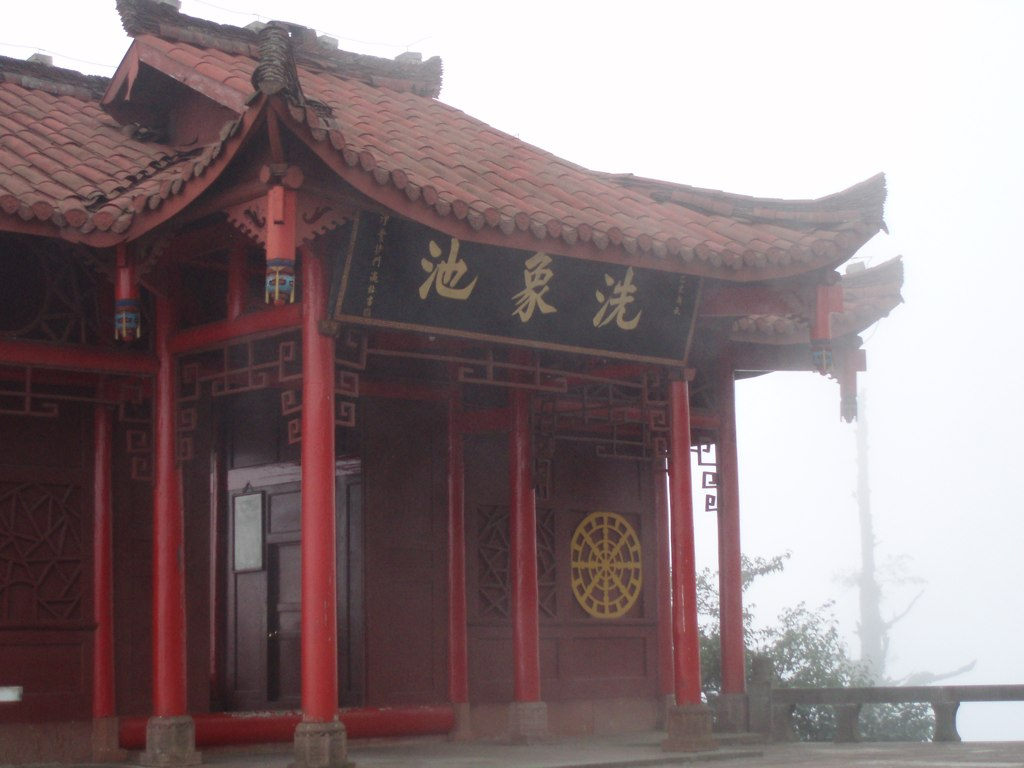

Xixiang Chi (Chinese: 洗象池; pinyin: Xǐxiàng Chí; lit. 'Elephants' Washing Pool'), also known as Tianhua Chanyuan (simplified Chinese: 天花禅院; traditional Chinese: 天花禪院; pinyin: Tiānhuā Chányuàn), is one of the most important Buddhist temples and monasteries on Mount Emei in Emeishan City, Sichuan, China.

The temple is located more than 2,000 metres above sea level. The monastery was founded in the Ming dynasty and was expanded during the reign of the Kangxi Emperor in the Qing dynasty. The name of the temple comes from a legend which says that the Bodhisattva Samantabhadra once bathed his steed, a white elephant, in a pond near the temple. "Night Moon over the Elephant washing pond" ("Night Moon over the Elephant Washing Pool") is one of the ten sceneries of Mount Emei. When the moon is shining brightly at night and is reflected in the water, it creates an illusion where the viewer feels like they are in Heaven.

Important buildings in the temple are the Maitreya Hall, Main Hall, Guanyin Hall, "Tripitaka Pavilion" (library) and guest cottage.

The Temple is also a UNESCO Heritage Site.

== Monument ==
The temple stands since 2006 on the list of monuments of the People's Republic of China (1–133). The temple is also on the list of monuments of Sichuan Province.
