= Emei railway station =

Railway station in Sichuan, China

Emei 峨眉
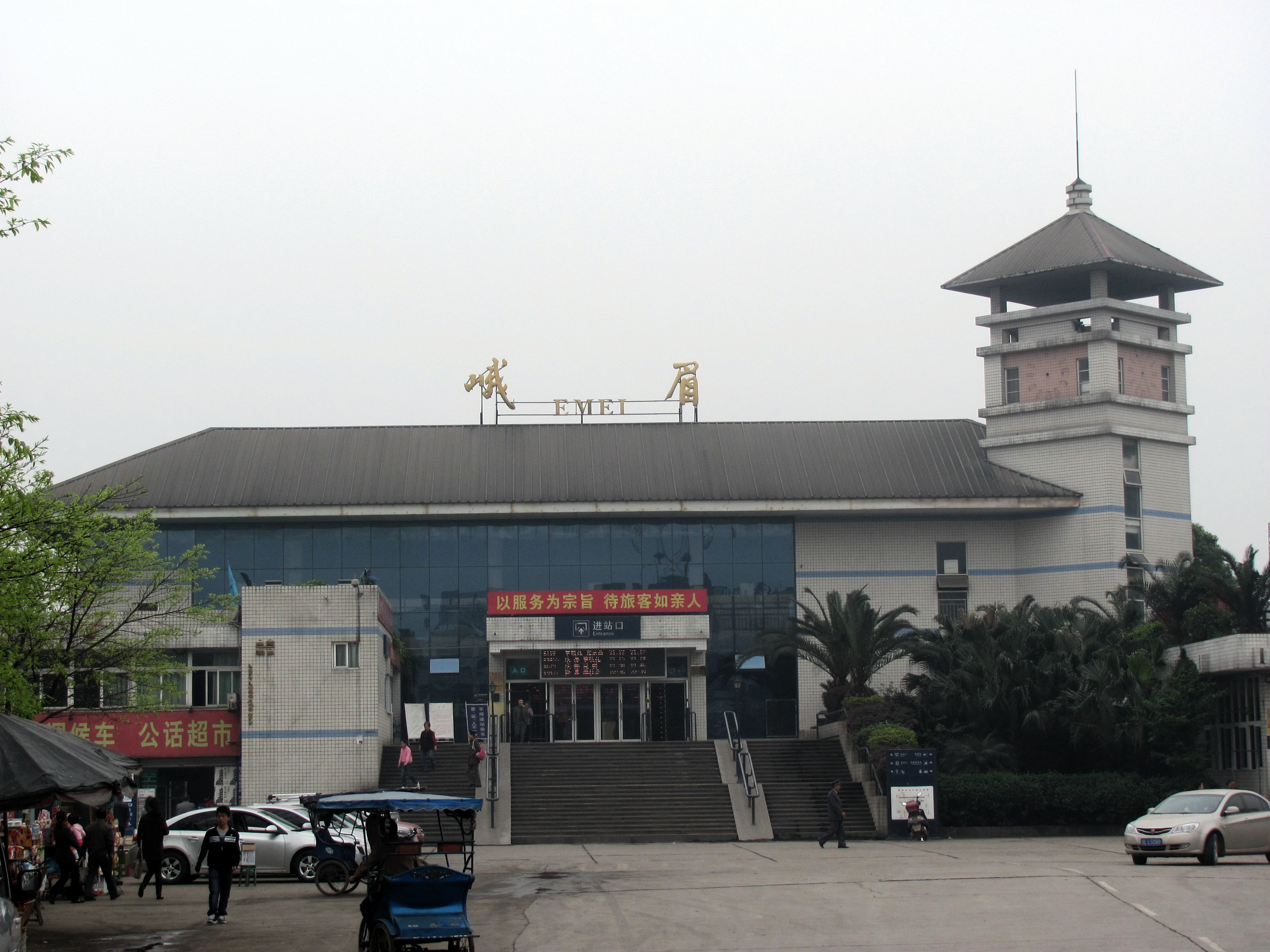
- The station in 2012, prior to relocation

General information
- Location: Suishan, Emeishan City, Leshan, Sichuan; China
- Coordinates: 29°35′11.92″N 103°31′12.51″E
- Operated by: China Railway High-speed
- Lines: Chengdu–Kunming railway Chengdu–Mianyang–Leshan intercity railway

History
- Opened: 1965
Location

Emei railway station is a railway station in Suishan, Emeishan City, Leshan, Sichuan, China. It is cross-shaped, with the lower north–south platforms serving the Chengdu–Kunming railway and the upper east–west platforms serving the Chengdu–Mianyang–Leshan intercity railway.

== History ==
Emei railway station was built with the Chengdu–Kunming railway and opened in 1965. The station was moved approximately 500m south to allow it to serve the Chengdu–Mianyang–Leshan intercity railway. It reopened in its new location on 26 April 2017.

== Gallery ==
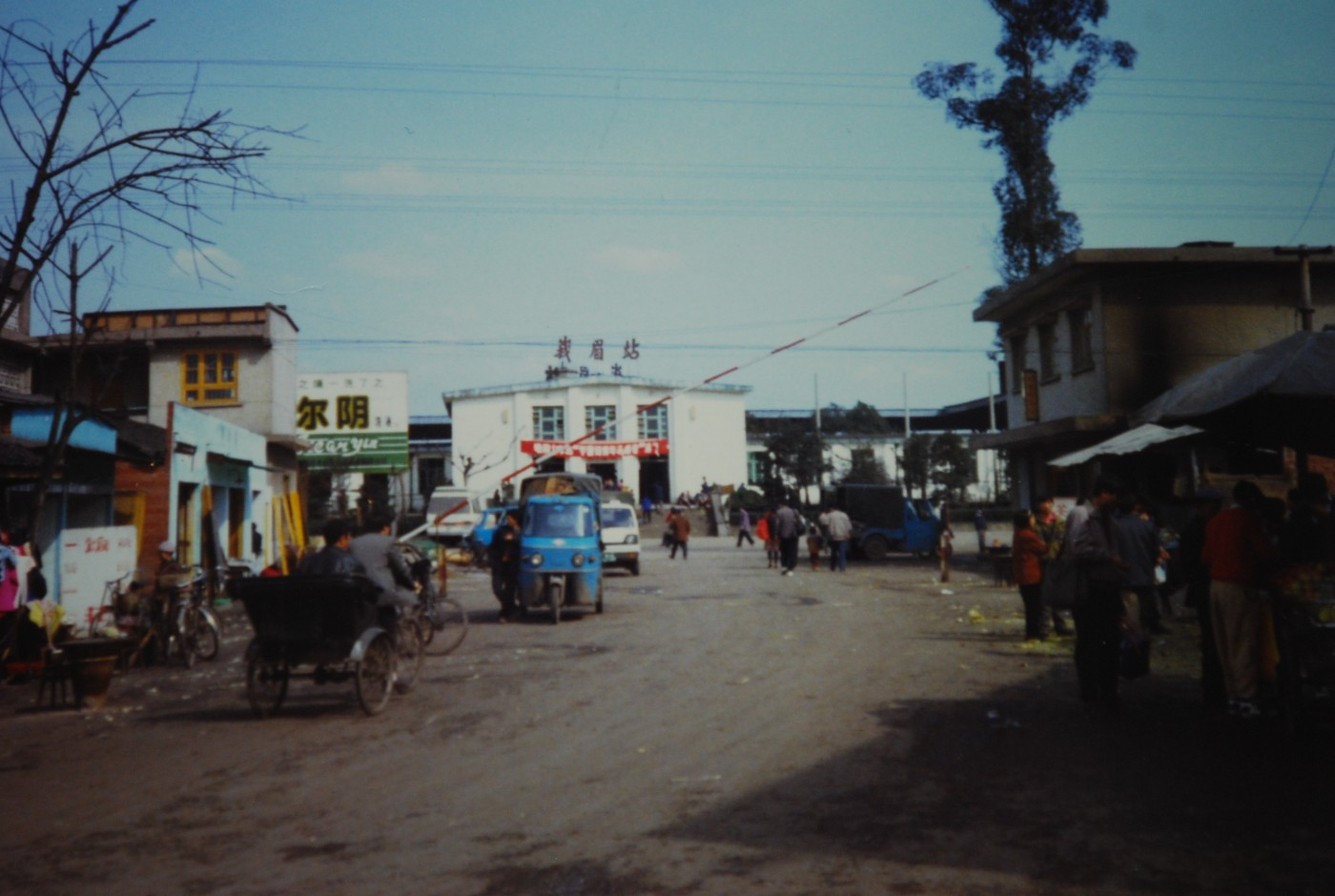
Station building in 1994

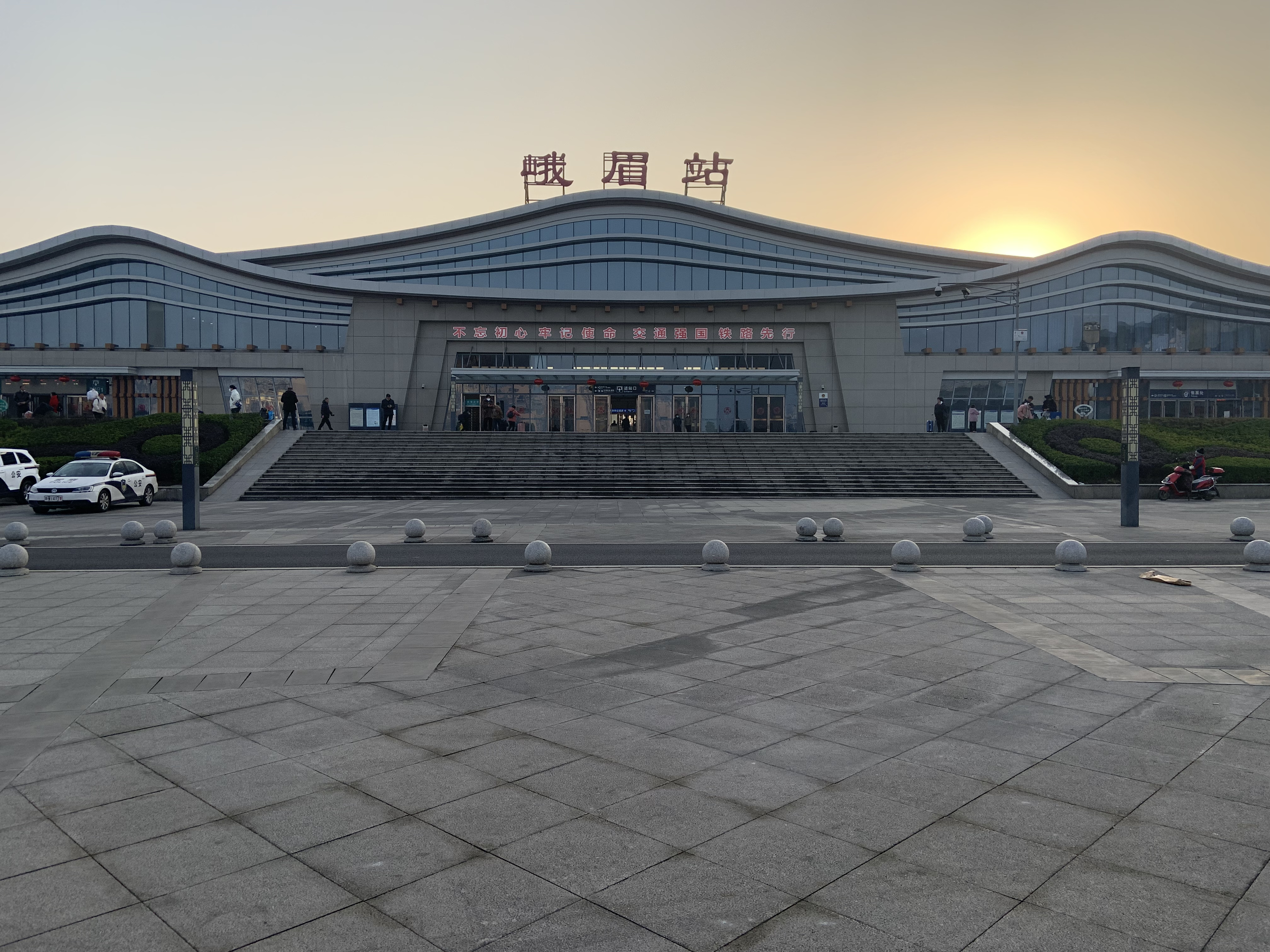
Station building in 2023

Preceding station	China Railway	Following station
Leshan North towards Chengdu	Chengdu–Kunming railway	Yangang towards Kunming
