= Shengji Bronze Bell =

Buddhist and cultural relic on Mount Emei, China

- 聖積銅鐘 (Chinese)
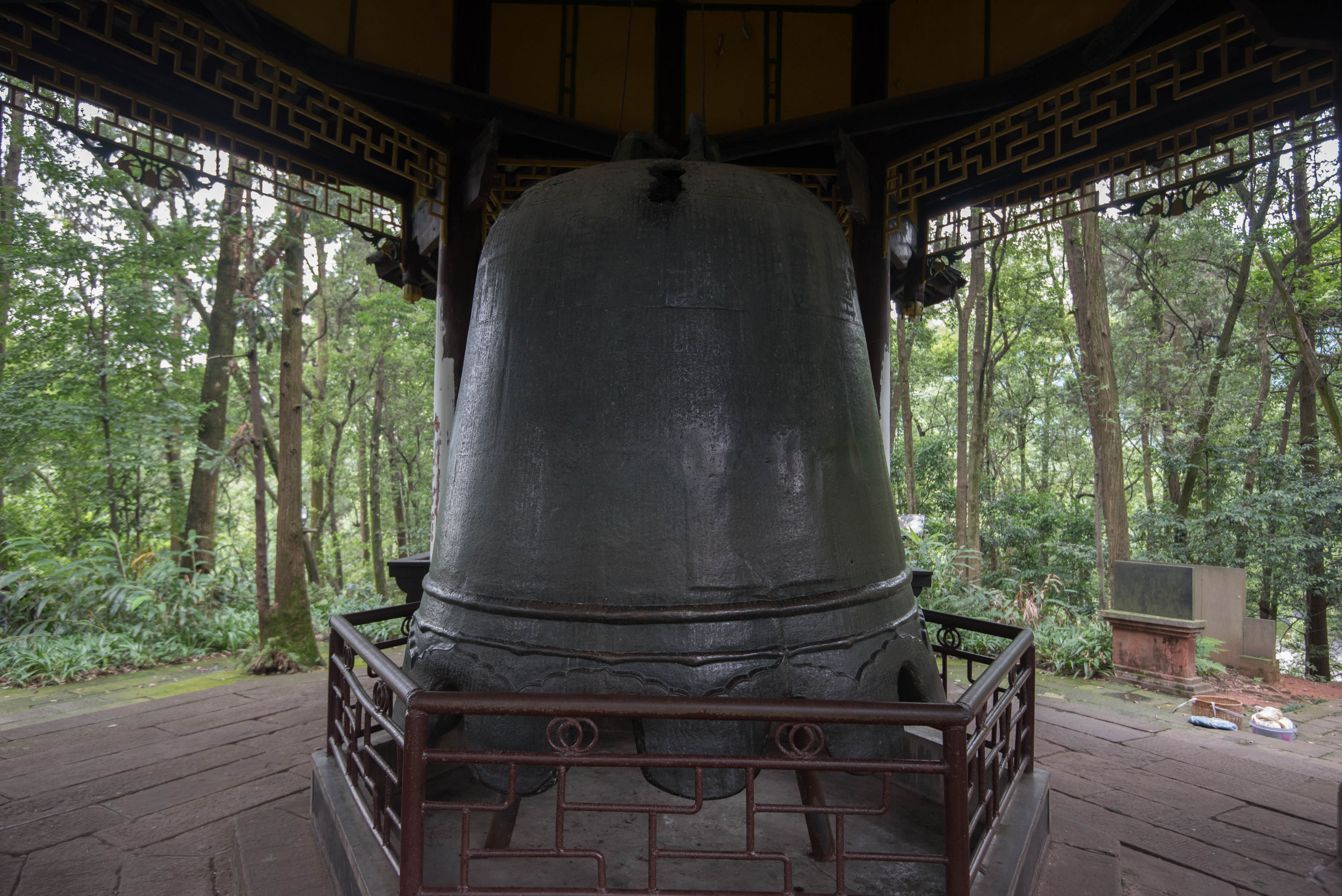
- The bell within the Pavilion.
- Type: Major Historical and Cultural Site of China
- Location: Shengji Temple, Mount Emei, China

History
- Built: 1564, Ming Dynasty

The Shengji Bronze Bell (Chinese: 聖積銅鐘; pinyin Shèngjī Tóngzhōng) is a bronze temple bell that was formerly located at a Buddhist temple known as Shengji Temple on Mount Emei in Sichuan Province, China. However, Shengji Temple was destroyed in 1959 and the bell is currently located in Baoguo Temple. It has been a Provincial-Level Protected Cultural Relic of Sichuan Province since 2002, and a Nationally Protected Cultural Relic of China since 2006.

== History ==
The bell was created c. 1564, during the Ming dynasty. It was inscribed with scriptural verses from the Agama Scriptures and was hung in the Treasure Building of the Shengji temple in 1567. In 1913, Sichuan Military Governor Yin Changheng ordered the bell to be melted to produce copper coins, but this did not occur. In 1959, the temple was destroyed, and the bell was kept in the ruins of the site. In 1966, during the Cultural Revolution, the bell was sent to Chongqing to be melted down as part of the four olds, but because it was too large to fit in the furnace, it survived yet again but was vandalized. In 1983, a new Pavilion was constructed to display the bell.

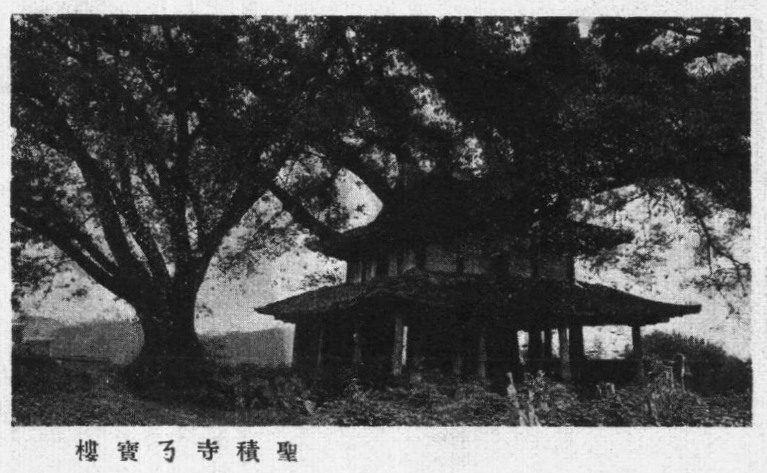
The Treasure Building of Shengji Temple, where the bell was kept
