= Mount Emei =

Buddhist mountain in Sichuan, China

- Emei Shan
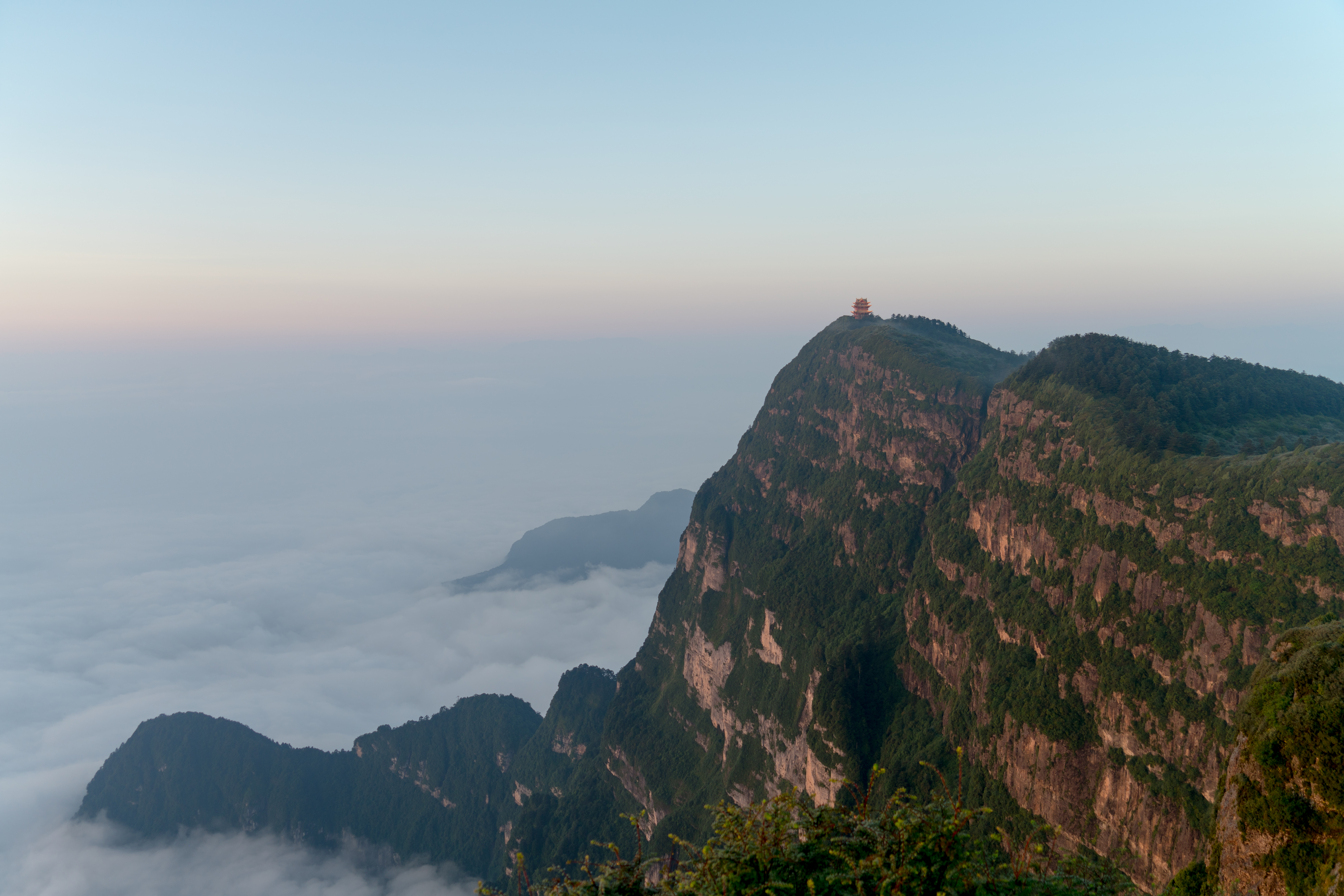
- Summit of Mount Emei

Highest point
- Elevation: 3,099 m (10,167 ft)
- Prominence: 1,069 m (3,507 ft)
- Listing: Mountains of China
- Coordinates: 29°31′11″N 103°19′57″E

Geography
- Location within Sichuan Location within China
- Country: China
- Province: Sichuan
- Municipality: Emeishan City

UNESCO World Heritage Site
- Official name: Mount Emei Scenic Area, including Leshan Giant Buddha Scenic Area
- Type: Mixed
- Criteria: iv, vi, x
- Designated: 1996 (20th session)
- Reference no.: 779
- Region: Asia-Pacific

Mount Emei
- "Mount Emei" in Chinese characters
- Chinese: 峨眉山
Transcriptions
Standard Mandarin
- Hanyu Pinyin: Éméi shān
- Gwoyeu Romatzyh: Ermei shan
- Wade–Giles: O^{2}-mei^{2} shan^{1}
- IPA: [ɤ̌.měɪ ʂán]
Wu
- Romanization: Ngu^{去} mi^{去} sae^{平}
Yue: Cantonese
- Yale Romanization: Ngòh-mèih sāan
- Jyutping: Ngo^{4}-mei^{4} saan^{1}
- IPA: [ŋɔ˩ mej˩ san˥]
Southern Min
- Hokkien POJ: Ngô-ba̍k-soaⁿ

Mount Emei ([ɤ̌.měɪ]; Chinese: 峨眉山; pinyin: Éméi shān), alternatively Mount Omei, is a 3,099-metre-tall (10,167 ft) mountain in Sichuan Province, China, and is the highest of the Four Sacred Buddhist Mountains of China. Mount Emei sits at the western rim of the Sichuan Basin. The mountains west of it are known as Daxiangling. A large surrounding area of countryside is geologically known as the Permian Emeishan Large Igneous Province, a large igneous province generated by the Emeishan Traps volcanic eruptions during the Permian Period.

Administratively, Mount Emei is located near the county-level city of the same name (Emeishan City), which is in turn part of the prefecture-level city of Leshan. It was made a UNESCO World Heritage Site in 1996.

== Name ==
Emei in Chinese means "towering eyebrows".

== Relevance to Buddhism ==
Chinese people offer burning sandalwood near the mountain to send their "prayers to heaven".

=== As a sacred mountain ===
Mount Emei is one of the Four Sacred Buddhist Mountains of China, and is traditionally regarded as the bodhimaṇḍa, or place of enlightenment, of the Bodhisattva Puxian (普賢菩薩; Samantabhadra).

Historical documents from the 16th and 17th centuries allude to the practice of martial arts in the monasteries of Mount Emei. These documents contain the earliest surviving reference to the Shaolin Monastery as the place of origin of Chinese martial arts.

Chinese Buddhist pilgrims regularly travel to the mountain.

=== Buddhist architecture on Emei ===
This is the location of the first Buddhist temple built in China in the 1st century CE. The site has seventy-six Buddhist monasteries of the Ming and Qing dynasties, most of them located near the mountain top. The monasteries demonstrate a flexible architectural style that adapts to the landscape. Some, such as the halls of Baoguosi, are built on terraces of varying levels, while others, including the structures of Leiyinsi, are on raised stilts. Here the fixed plans of Buddhist monasteries of earlier periods were modified or ignored in order to make full use of the natural scenery. The buildings of Qingyinge are laid out in an irregular plot on the narrow piece of land between the Black Dragon River and the White Dragon River. The site is large and the winding footpath is 50 km (31 mi) long, taking several days to walk.

Cable cars ease the ascent to the two temples at Jinding (3,077 m), an hour's hike from the mountain's peak.

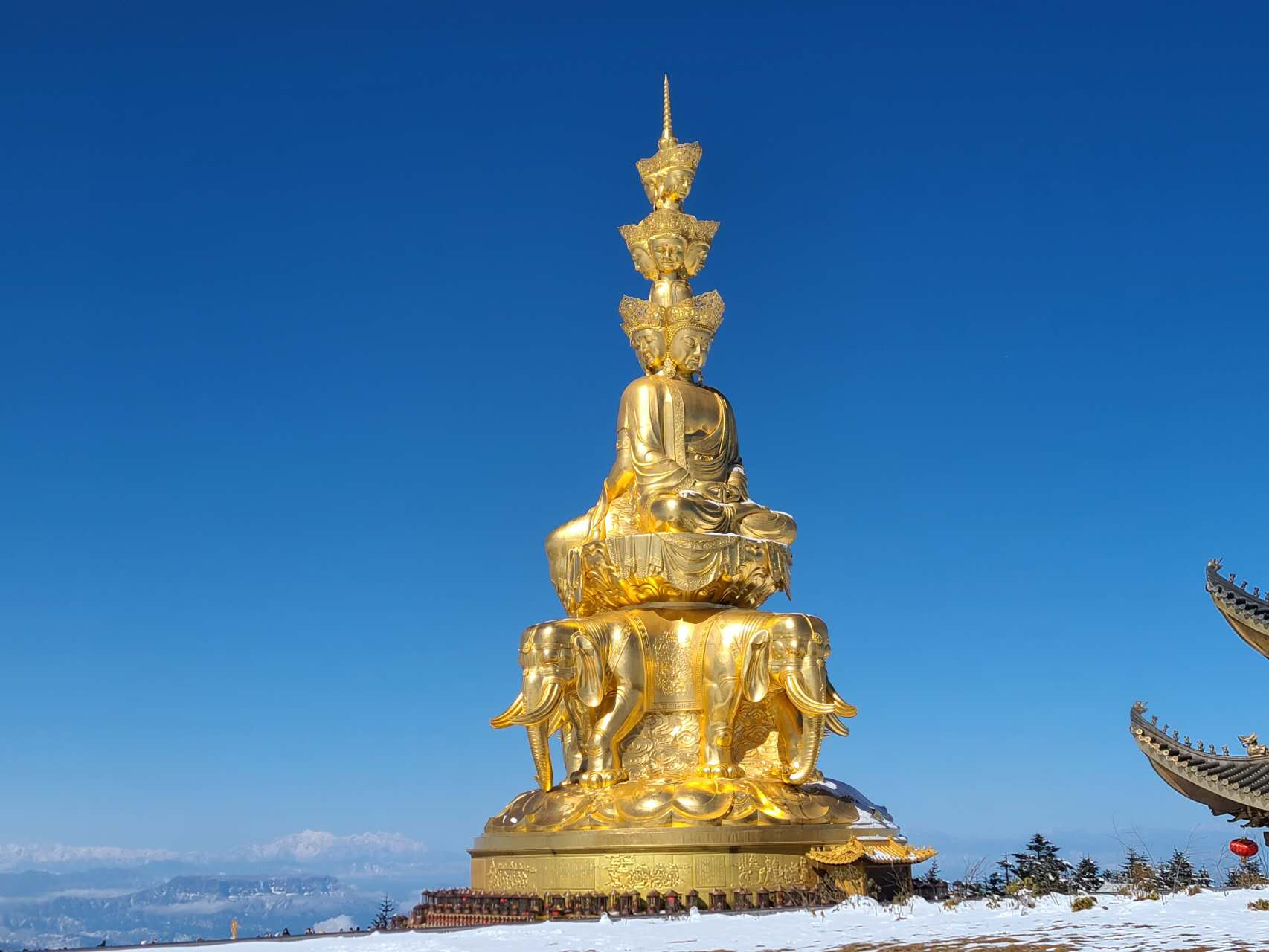
Statue of Bodhisattva of Pu Xian

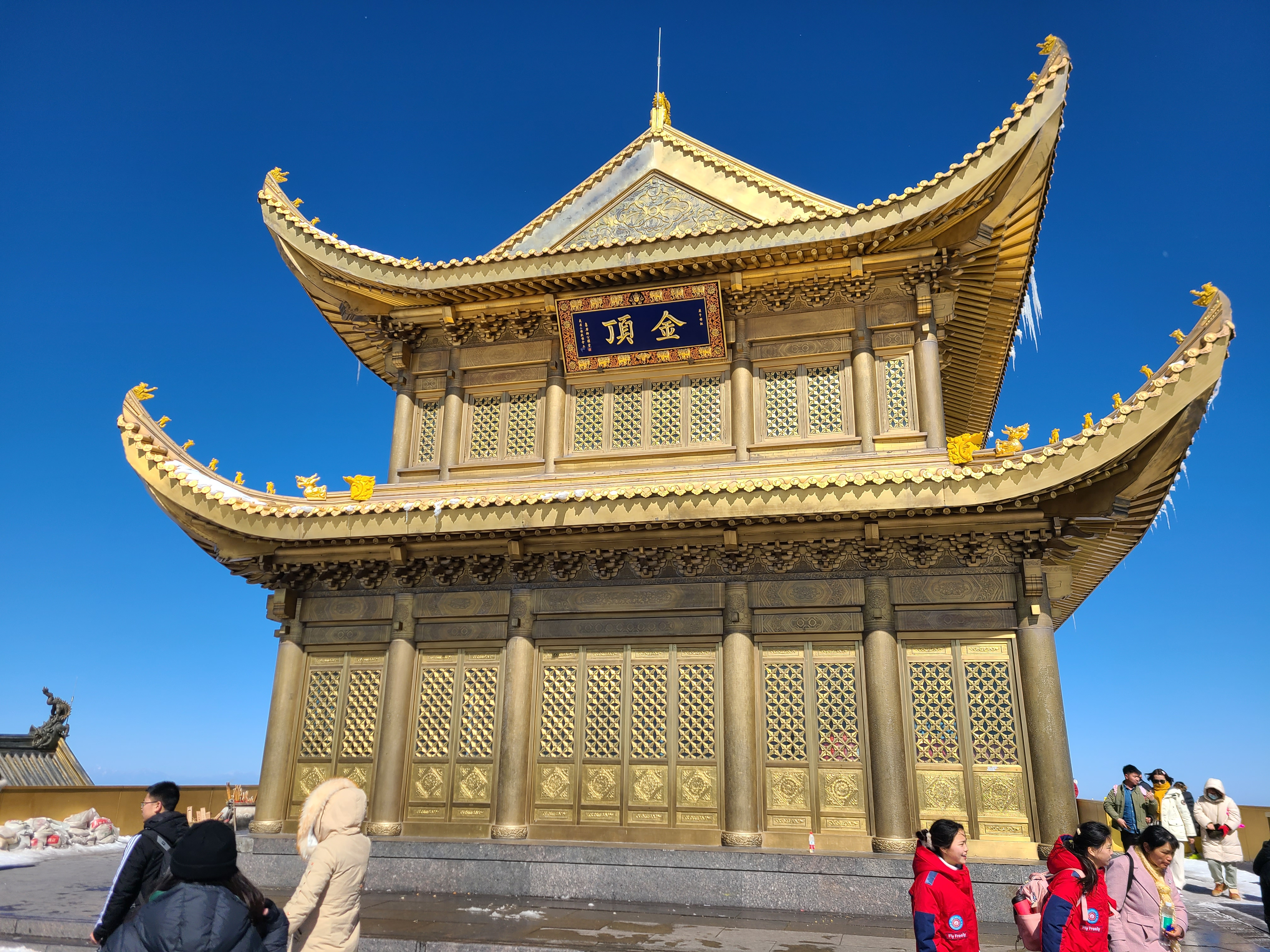
Jinding is an important attraction of Mount Emei

== Climate ==
The summit of Mount Emei has an alpine subarctic climate (Köppen Dwc), with long, cold (but not severely so) winters, and short, cool summers. The monthly 24-hour average temperature ranges from −5.7 °C (21.7 °F) in January to 11.6 °C (52.9 °F) in July, and the annual mean is 3.07 °C (37.5 °F). Precipitation is common year-round (occurring on more than 250 days), but due to the influence of the monsoon, rainfall is especially heavy in summer, and more than 70% of the annual total occurs from June to September.

Climate data for Mount Emei, elevation 3,070 m (10,070 ft), (1991–2020 normals, extremes 1971–present)
Month	Jan	Feb	Mar	Apr	May	Jun	Jul	Aug	Sep	Oct	Nov	Dec	Year
Record high °C (°F)	17.7 (63.9)	18.6 (65.5)	23.9 (75.0)	22.7 (72.9)	24.2 (75.6)	22.5 (72.5)	22.1 (71.8)	21.5 (70.7)	22.2 (72.0)	19.3 (66.7)	19.5 (67.1)	18.9 (66.0)	22.7 (72.9)
Mean daily maximum °C (°F)	−0.2 (31.6)	1.8 (35.2)	4.6 (40.3)	8.4 (47.1)	11.1 (52.0)	13.5 (56.3)	15.7 (60.3)	15.1 (59.2)	12.2 (54.0)	7.5 (45.5)	5.0 (41.0)	1.1 (34.0)	8.0 (46.4)
Daily mean °C (°F)	−5.5 (22.1)	−3.6 (25.5)	−0.6 (30.9)	3.7 (38.7)	6.9 (44.4)	9.9 (49.8)	12.1 (53.8)	11.5 (52.7)	8.6 (47.5)	4.0 (39.2)	0.5 (32.9)	−3.7 (25.3)	3.7 (38.6)
Mean daily minimum °C (°F)	−8.8 (16.2)	−6.9 (19.6)	−3.7 (25.3)	0.7 (33.3)	4.1 (39.4)	7.4 (45.3)	9.8 (49.6)	9.3 (48.7)	6.4 (43.5)	1.9 (35.4)	−2.3 (27.9)	−6.8 (19.8)	0.9 (33.7)
Record low °C (°F)	−19.2 (−2.6)	−19.1 (−2.4)	−17.2 (1.0)	−10.6 (12.9)	−7.4 (18.7)	−0.2 (31.6)	2.1 (35.8)	2.8 (37.0)	−3.5 (25.7)	−11.1 (12.0)	−14.7 (5.5)	−19.7 (−3.5)	−19.7 (−3.5)
Average precipitation mm (inches)	13.3 (0.52)	21.5 (0.85)	57.7 (2.27)	118.4 (4.66)	169.2 (6.66)	214.8 (8.46)	348.2 (13.71)	385.2 (15.17)	192.7 (7.59)	90.7 (3.57)	35.5 (1.40)	14.0 (0.55)	1,661.2 (65.41)
Average precipitation days (≥ 0.1 mm)	14.9	15.9	20.7	21.1	21.7	23.2	22.2	21.9	22.6	24.6	16.9	13.9	239.6
Average snowy days	15.3	13.1	14.0	7.6	2.1	0.1	0.0	0.1	0.3	4.4	8.2	10.8	76
Average relative humidity (%)	79	80	85	86	85	87	89	90	91	93	86	80	86
Mean monthly sunshine hours	147.2	138.2	142.8	132.5	113.2	91.1	110.9	113.4	89.0	77.4	131.0	143.3	1,430
Percentage possible sunshine	45	44	38	34	27	22	26	28	24	22	41	45	33
Source 1: China Meteorological Administration all-time extreme temperature All-Time Dec Record High
Source 2: Weather China

== Flora ==
The flora of Mount Emei varies with elevation, from subtropical evergreen forests at lower elevations to subalpine shrubland around the summit. The mountain is notable for both its species richness and abundance of endemic plants.

At lower elevations Mount Emei is home to the largest, most intact stands of the native Sichuan Basin evergreen broadleaf forest that once covered the Sichuan Basin. Subtropical oaks, Schima, a tree in the tea family, and laurels of the genera Machilus, Lindera, Litsea, Cinnamomum, and Phoebe are the predominant trees. Above 1500 meters elevation the subtropical evergreen forests transition to mixed evergreen and deciduous broadleaf forests, then mixed broadleaf deciduous and conifer forests and subalpine conifer forests, with subalpine shrubland above 2800 meters elevation.

The mountain is known for its high level of endemism, and approximately 100 plant species have been described as endemic to the area. These include Abies fabri, a rare species of fir tree, and Magnolia omeiensis, a species of magnolia tree.

== Fauna ==
About 2,300 animal species have been recorded on the mountain, including 51 mammals, 256 birds, 34 reptiles, 33 amphibians, 60 fish, 42 oligochaetes, and over 1000 insects. Native mammals include the lesser or red panda (Ailurus fulgens), Asian golden cat (Catopuma temminckii), Asian black bear (Ursus thibetanus), and mainland serow (Capricornis sumatraensis).

Visitors to Mount Emei often see Tibetan macaques taking food from tourists. A one-armed female macaque named Xing Xing has appeared in popular online videos that show her taking food while ignoring tourists. An elderly resident living on the mountain and her son are able to approach, feed, and pet Xing Xing, who accepts their food while rejecting offers from strangers. If tourists continue to hold food near the macaques, the animals may grab at clothing, stare, or bite if provoked. Local merchants sell nuts and other foods for tourists to feed the macaques.

Limited-range and threatened birds include the golden-fronted fulvetta (Schoeniparus variegaticeps), grey-hooded parrotbill (Suthora zappeyi), three-toed parrotbill (Paradoxornis paradoxus), Emei Shan liocichla (Liocichla omeiensis), red-winged laughingthrush (Trochalopteron formosum), Omei warbler (Phylloscopus omeiensis), Emei leaf warbler (Phylloscopus emeiensis), rusty-breasted tit (Poecile davidi), and slaty bunting (Emberiza siemsseni).

Native amphibians include the Chinese giant salamander (Andrias davidianus) and Omei toothed toad (Oreolalax omeimontis). There are at least six snake species native to the region, including the Chinese slug snake, Mandarin ratsnake, mountain water snake, Peters' odd-scaled snake, plus some potently venomous species, such as the Chinese green tree viper, the brown spotted pitviper and the Taiwan mountain pitviper. Other local animals include lizards, such as the Indian forest skink and the lacerta Takydromus intermedius, the frogs Rana adenopleura and Vibrissaphora liui, and a giant, half-metre long earthworm species, Pheretima praepinguis.

== Gallery ==
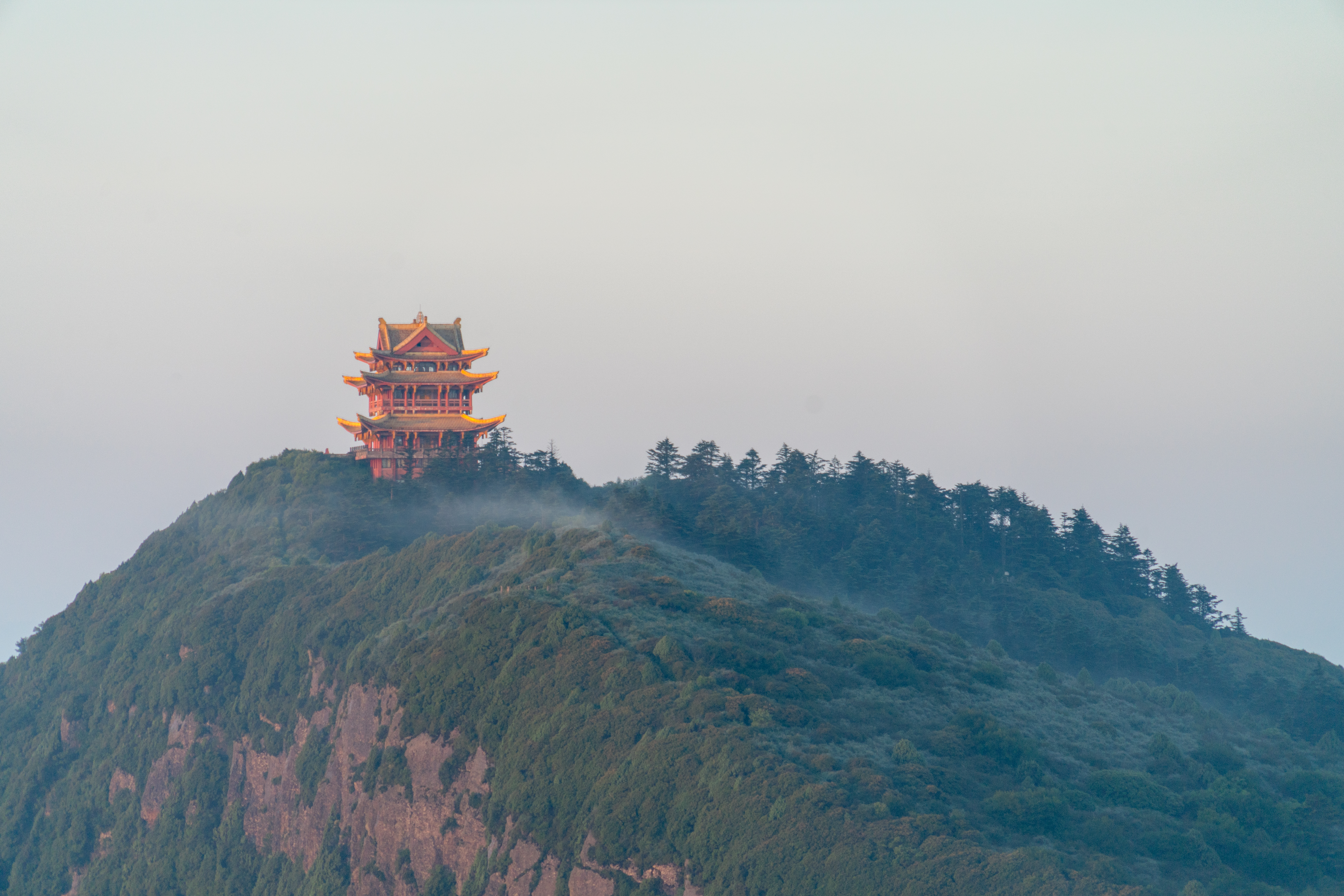
Wanfoding

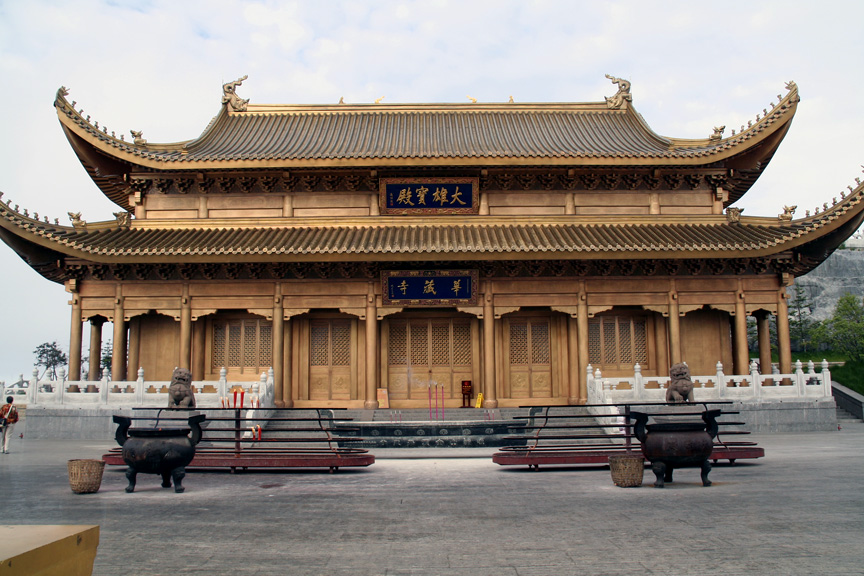
A temple at the Golden Summit

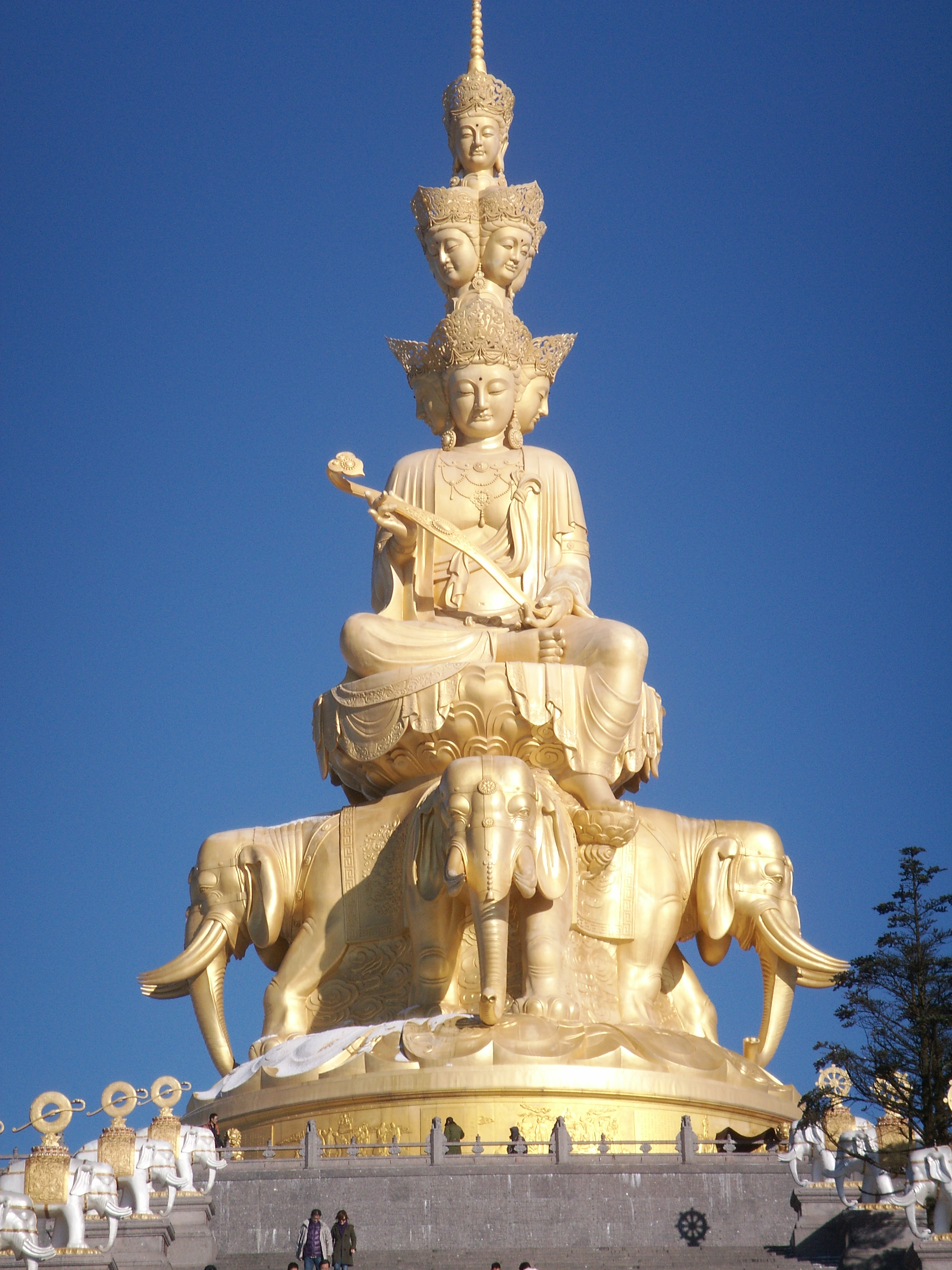
Massive statue of Samantabhadra at the summit of Mount Emei

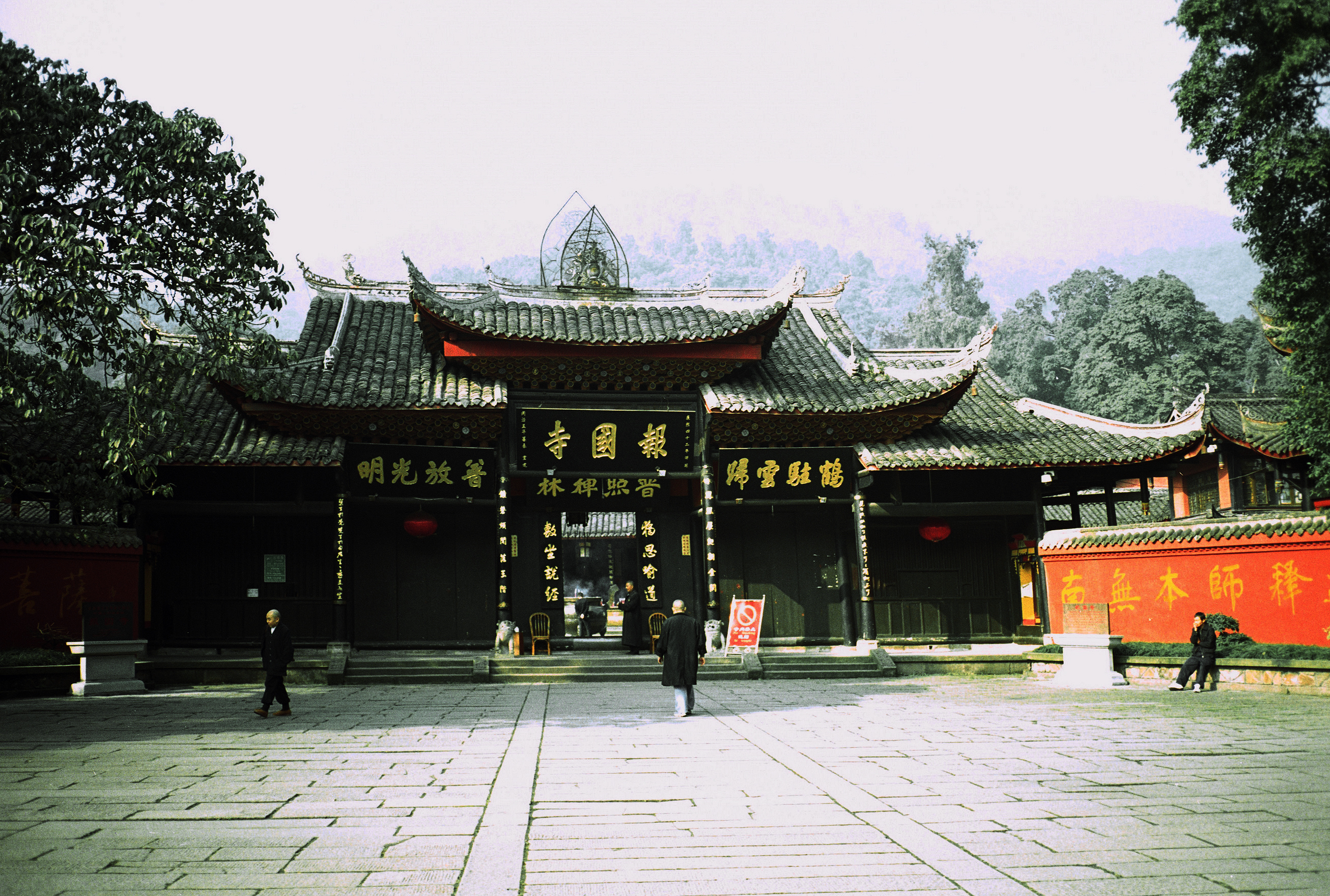
Baoguo Temple, a Buddhist temple

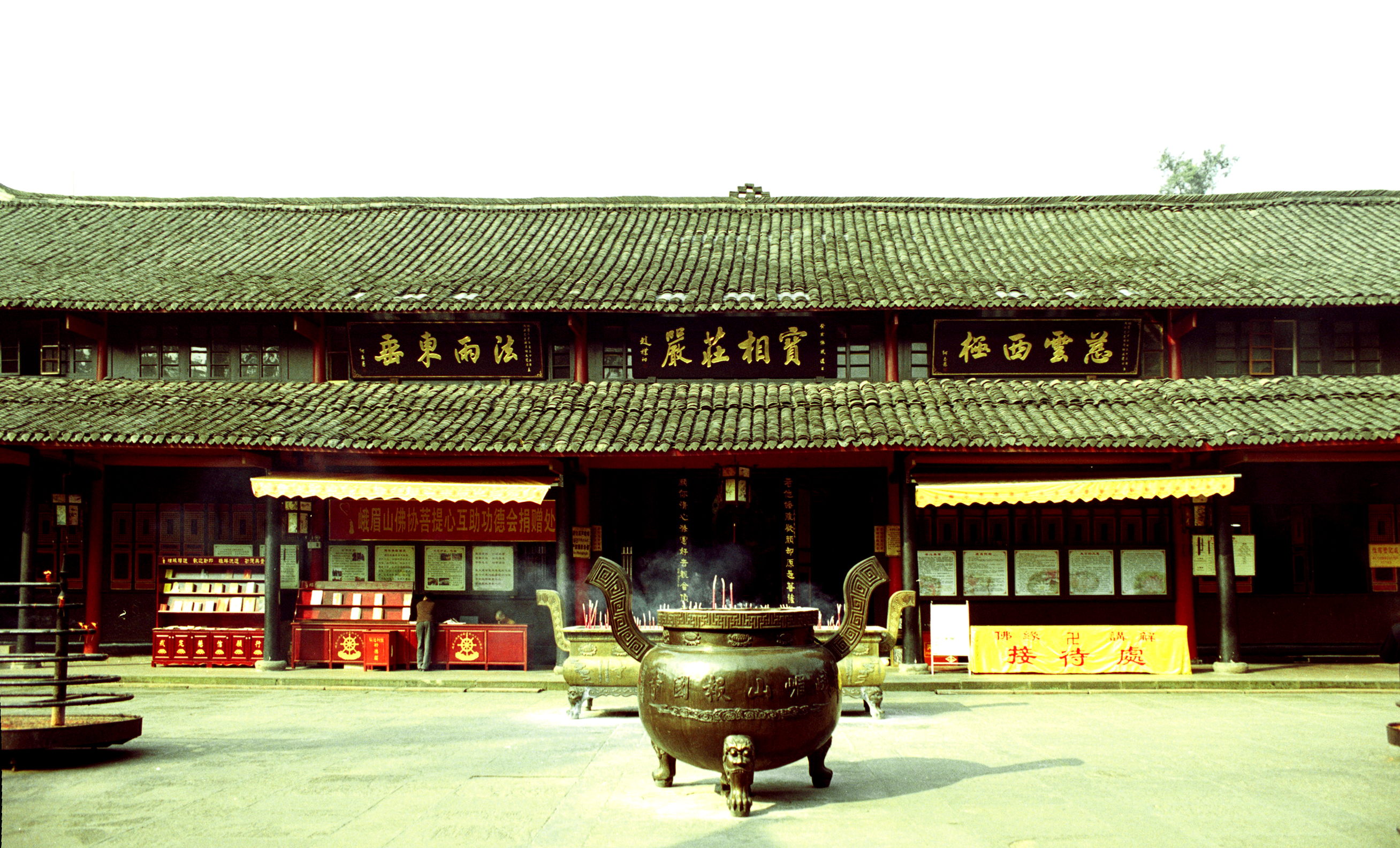
Buddhist temple at Mount Emei

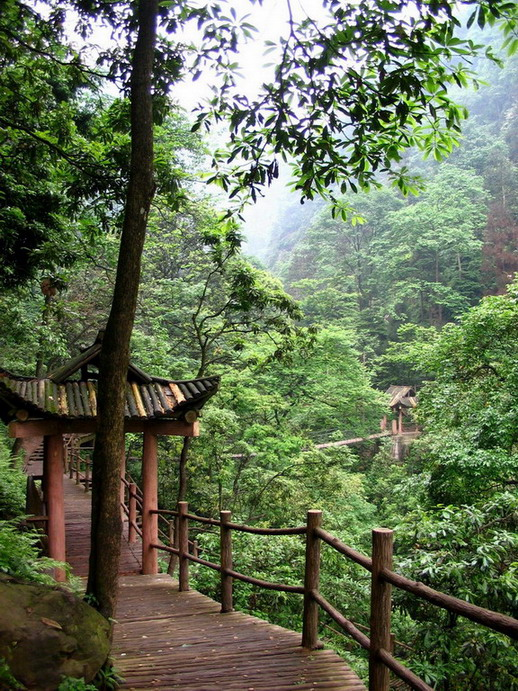
Wooden bridgewalk over the Crystal Stream, western slopes

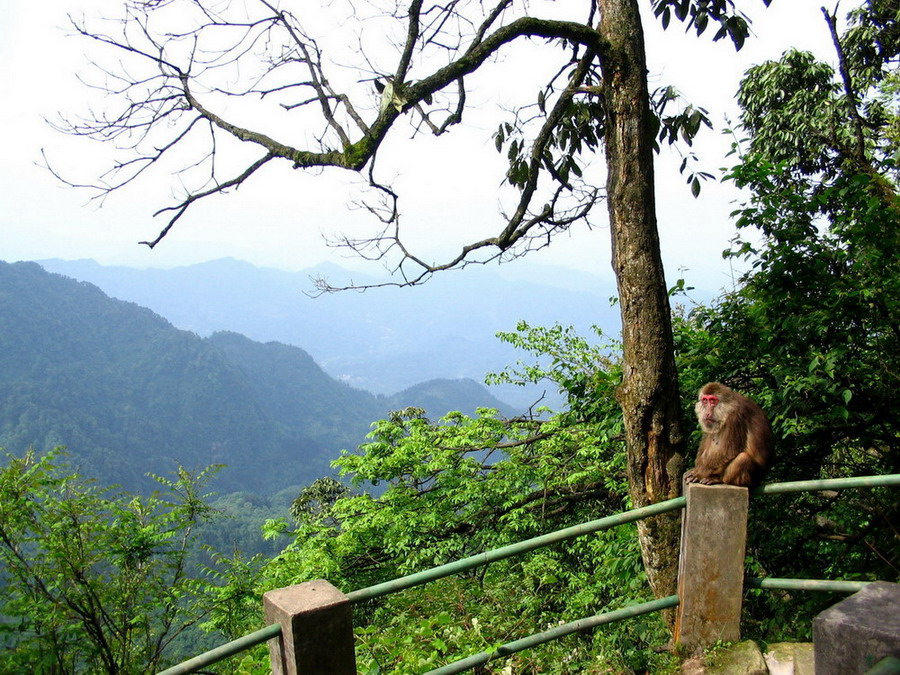
Macaque indigenous to the region

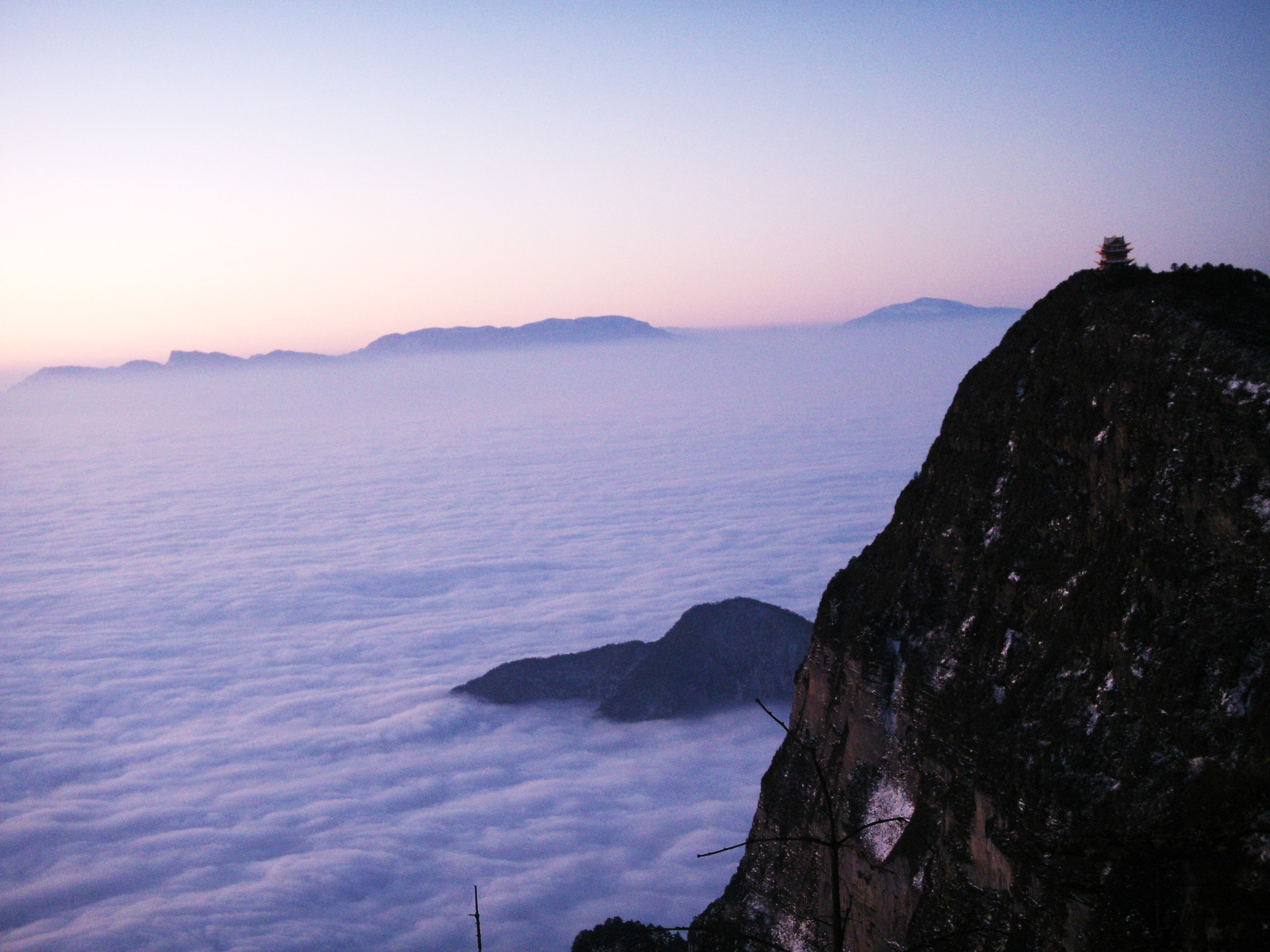
Sunrise over Mount Emei

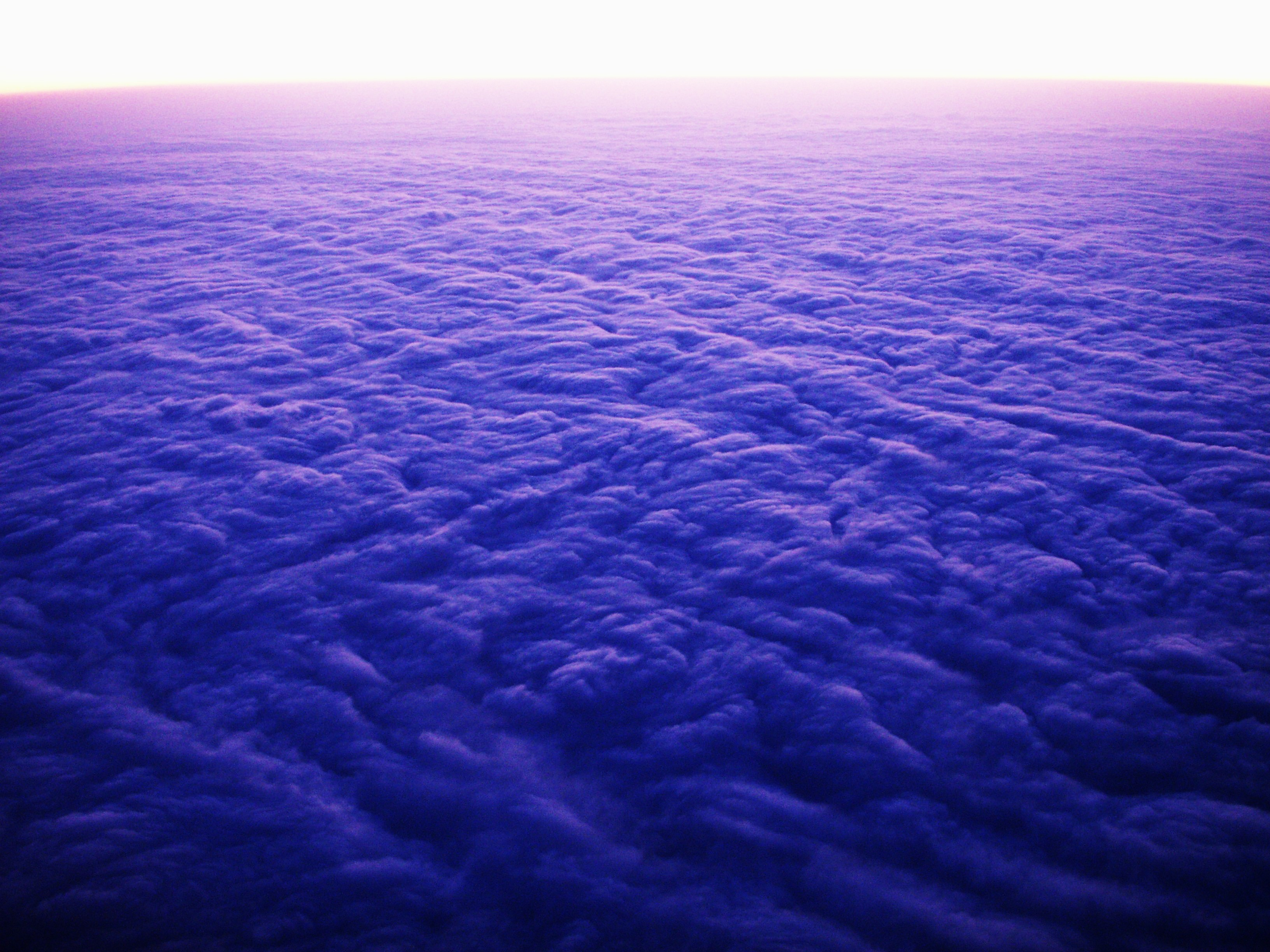
Sunrise over a sea of clouds at Mount Emei

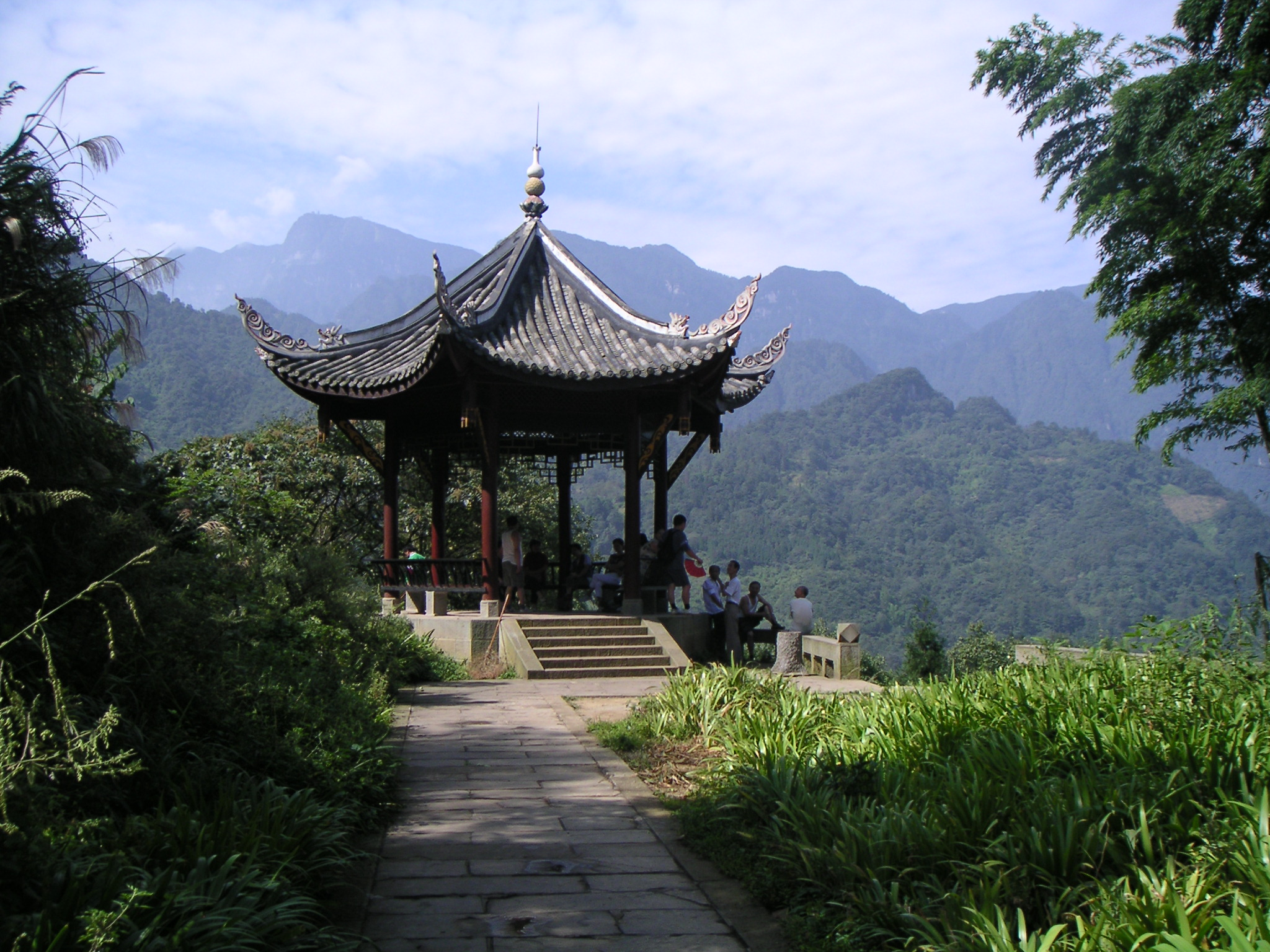
Guangfu pavilion, with summit visible in background

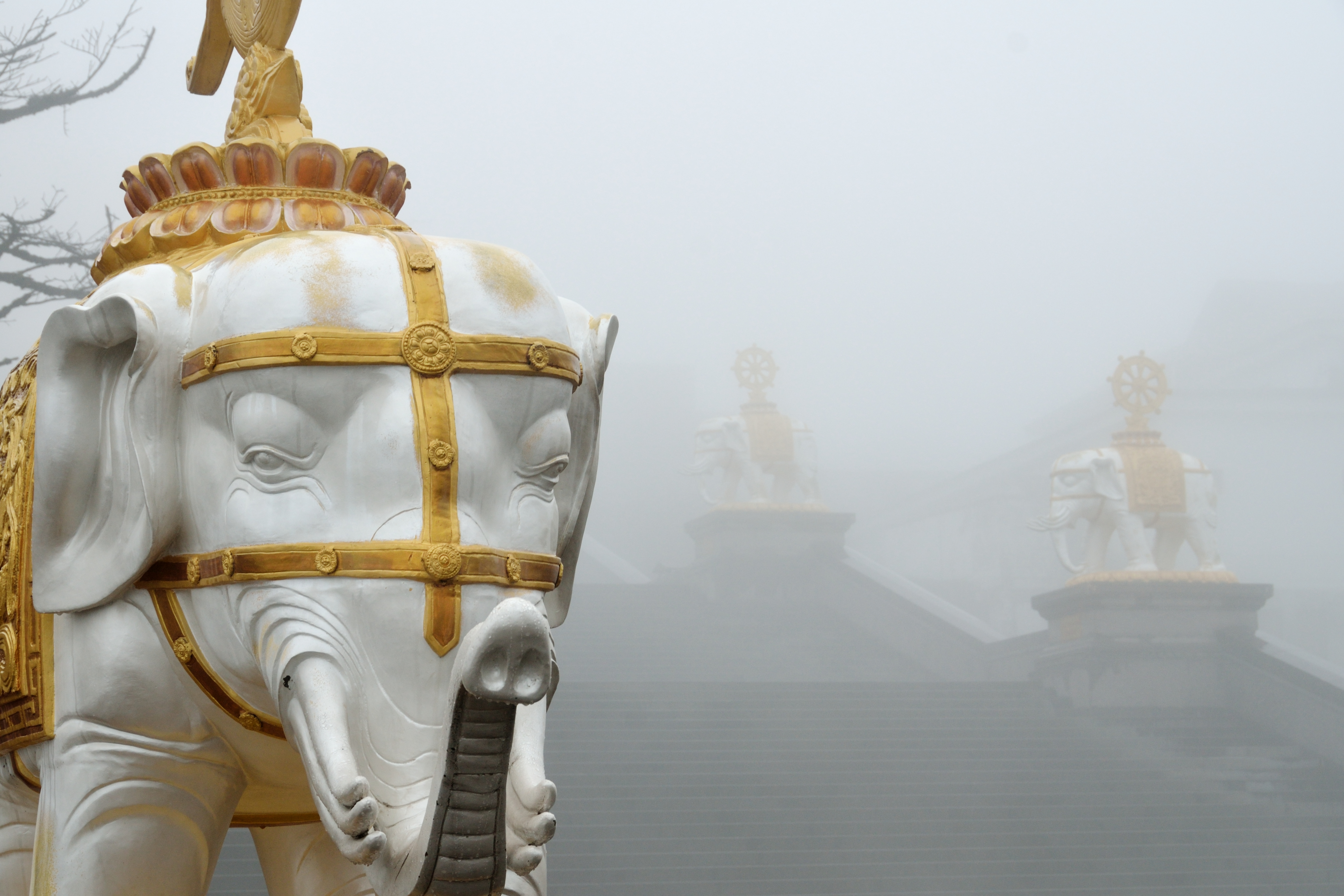
Elephant statues on the steps leading to the statue of Samantabhadra

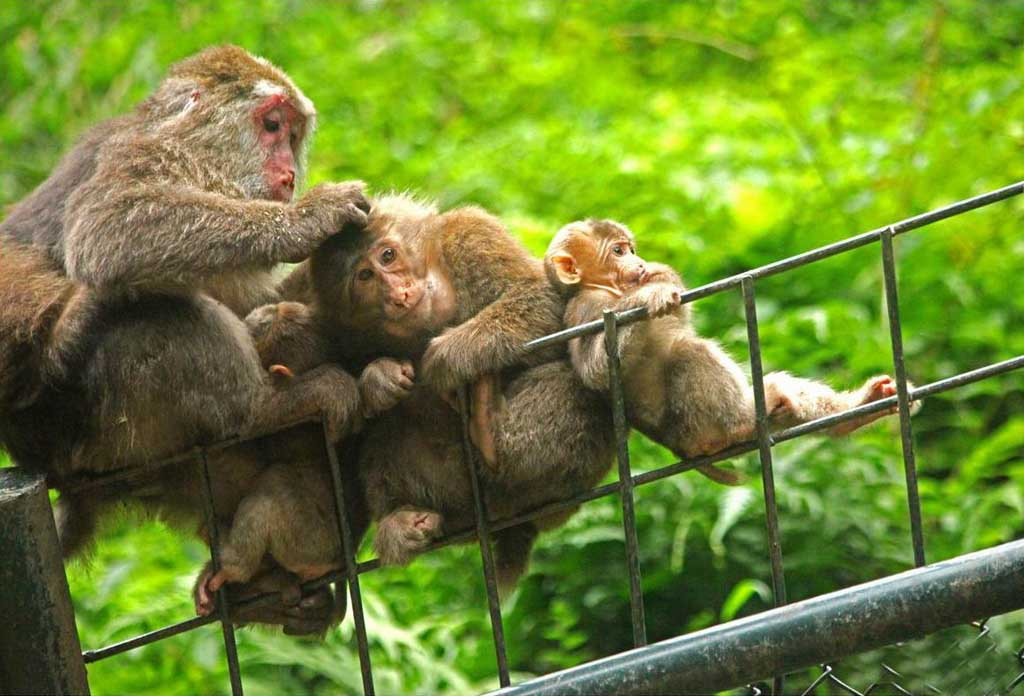
Monkeys of Mount Emei

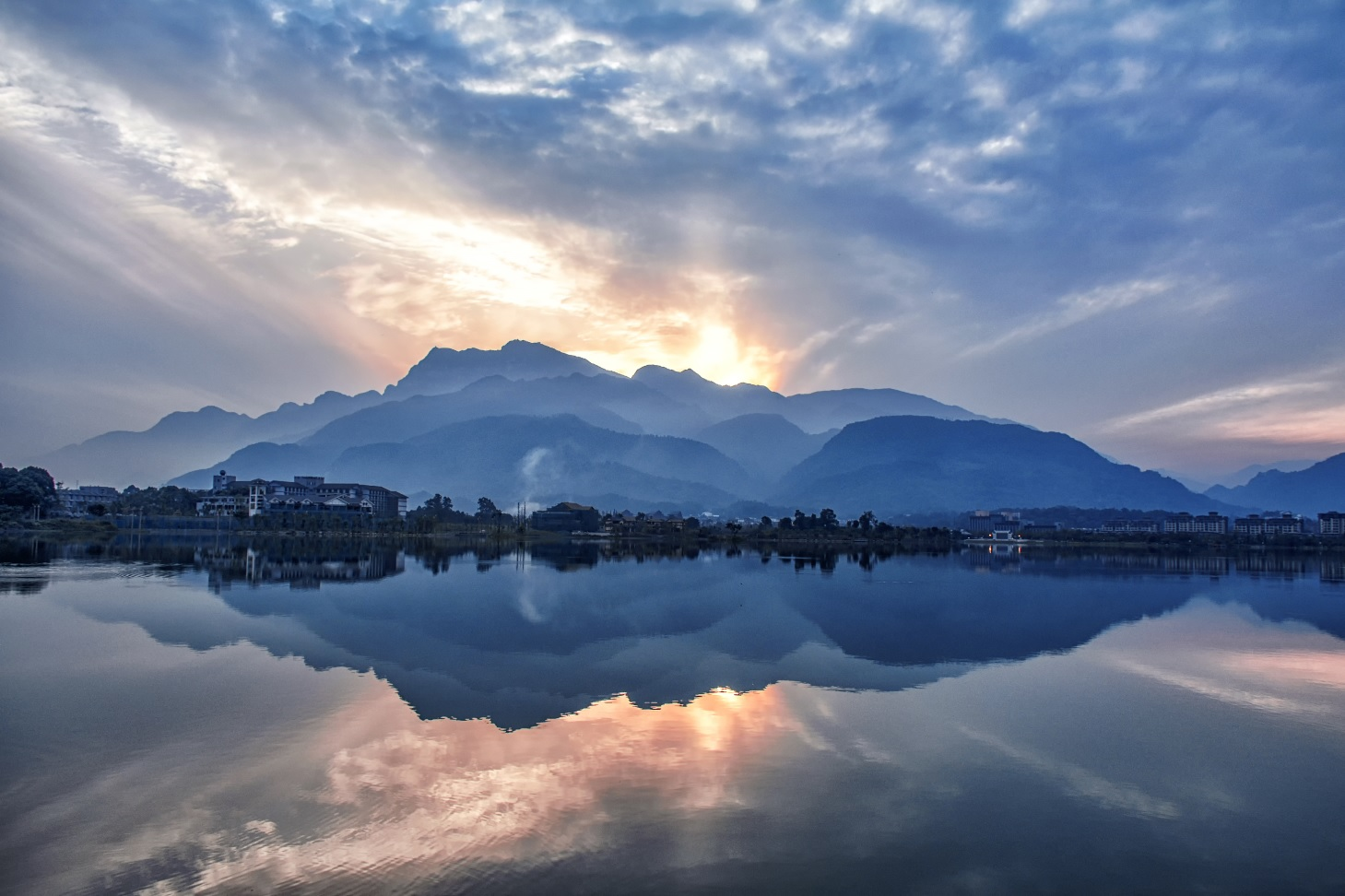
Mount Emei and Exiu Lake

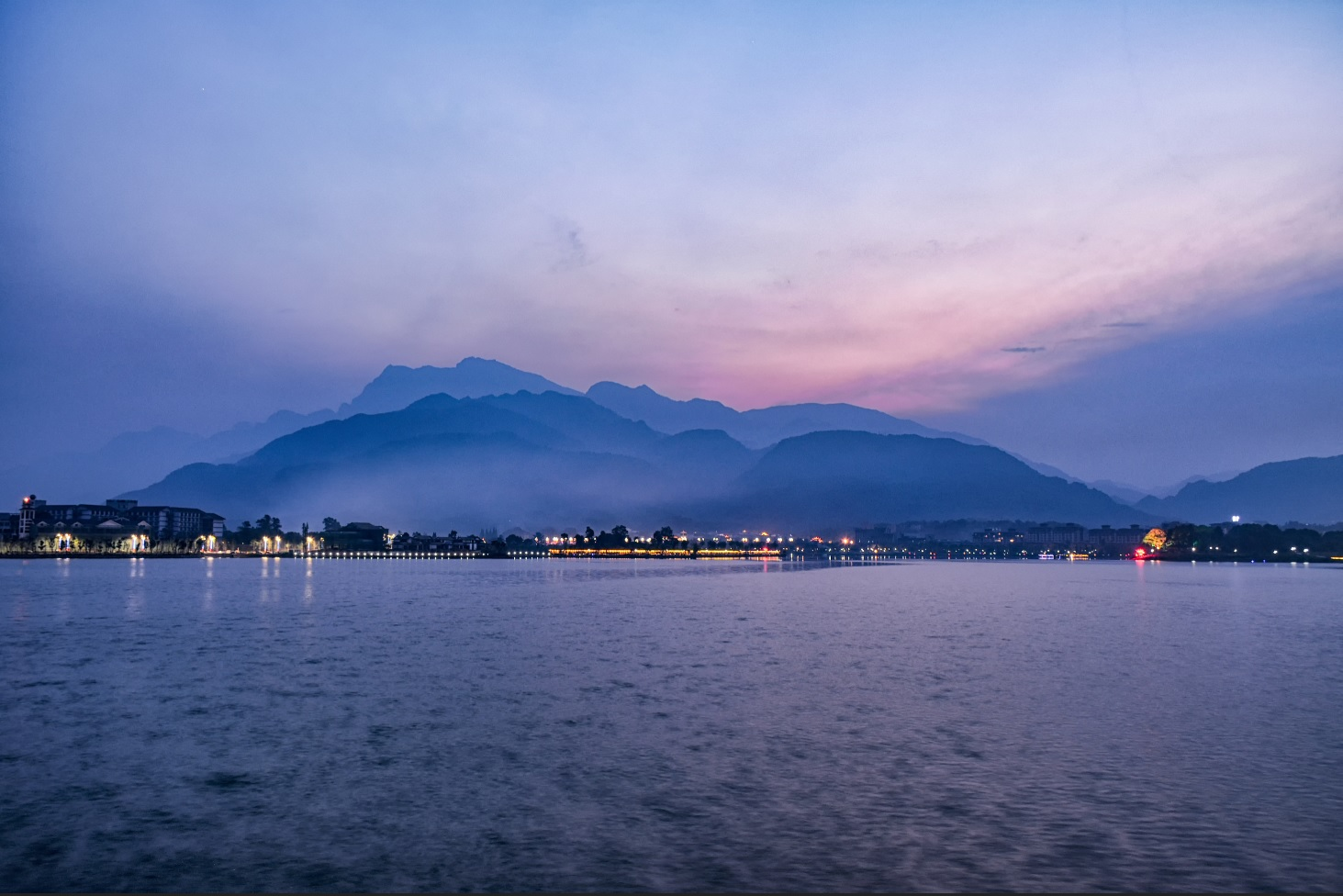
Mount Emei and Exiu Lake

== See also ==
- Baoguo Temple
- Fuhu Temple
- Jinding, main peak of Mount Emei
- Shengji Bronze Bell
- Wannian Temple
- Xixiang Chi, also known as Tianhua Chanyuan
- Zuo Ci
- Emei School, fictional martial arts school
- Omeisaurus
