= Sichuan Basin evergreen broadleaf forests =

Ecoregion in Sichuan Basin, China

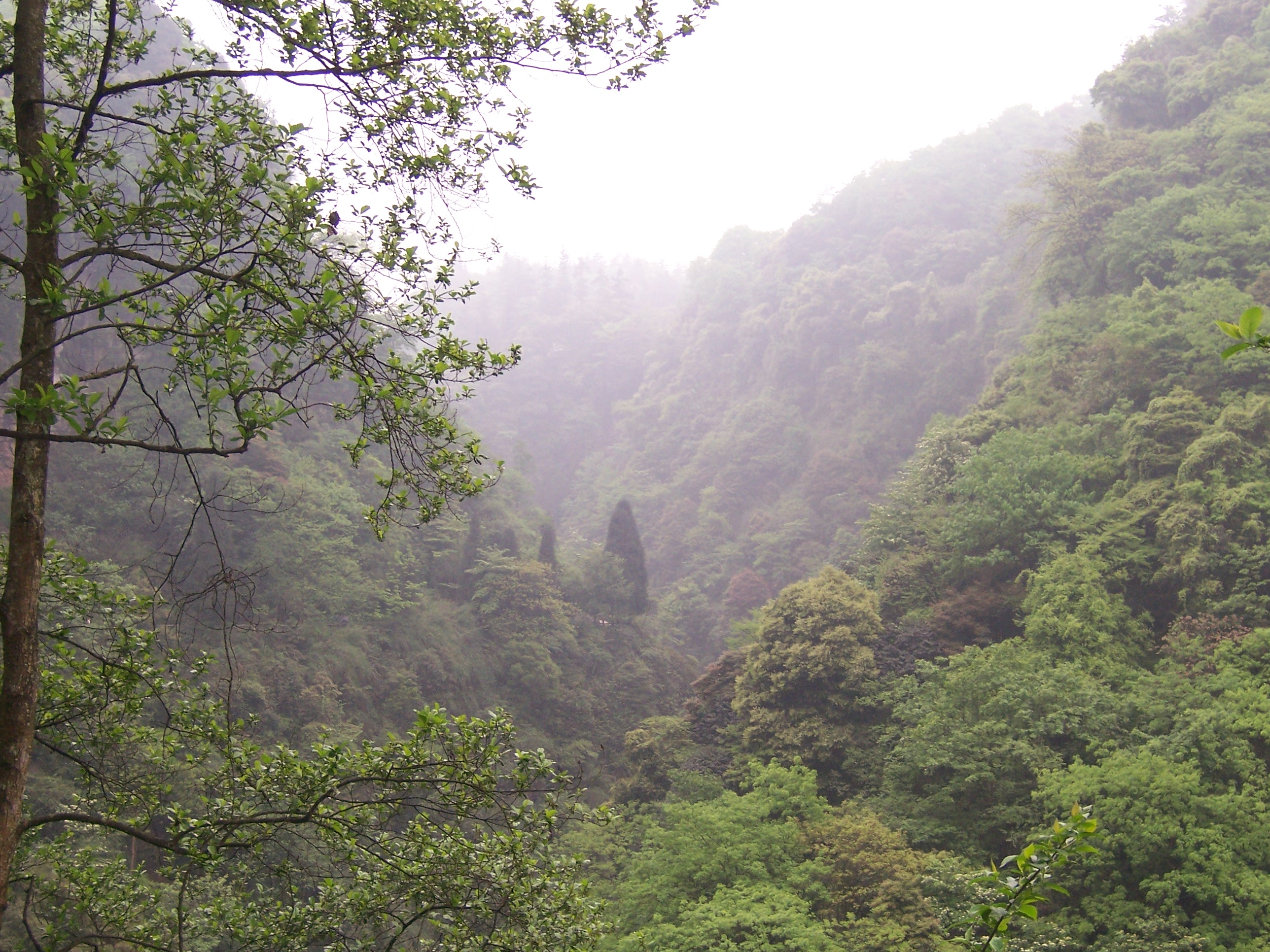
- Evergreen broadleaf forest on Mount Emei

- Location of ecoregion

Ecology
- Realm: Palearctic
- Biome: Temperate broadleaf and mixed forests

Geography
- Country: China

The Sichuan Basin evergreen broadleaf forests are a critically endangered WWF ecoregion. The ecoregion occupies the Sichuan Basin in China and covers an area of 9,816,054 ha (24,256,000 acres). The broadleaf forest habitat once covered the Sichuan Basin, but today is limited to mountains and preserved temple grounds in the basin and around the basin's rim. An especially well-preserved example of remaining forest exists on Mount Emei at the western edge of the Sichuan Basin. The original forests are thought to have been made up of subtropical oaks, laurels, and Schima. Much of the remaining Sichuan Basin has been converted to anthropogenic agricultural use in the last 5,000 years.

== Fauna ==
Endangered and critically endangered animal species that have traditionally inhabited the Sichuan Basin evergreen broadleaf forests include:

Amphibians

- Boulenger's paa frog
- Chinese giant salamander
- Chinting lazy toad
- Omei lazy toad

Birds

- Baer's pochard
- Far Eastern curlew
- Oriental stork
- Scaly-sided merganser
- Sichuan partridge
- Silver oriole
- Yellow-breasted bunting

Mammals

- Chinese forest musk deer
- Chinese pangolin
- Dhole
- Red panda
