= Jinding =

Buddhist temple on main peak of Mount Emei, China

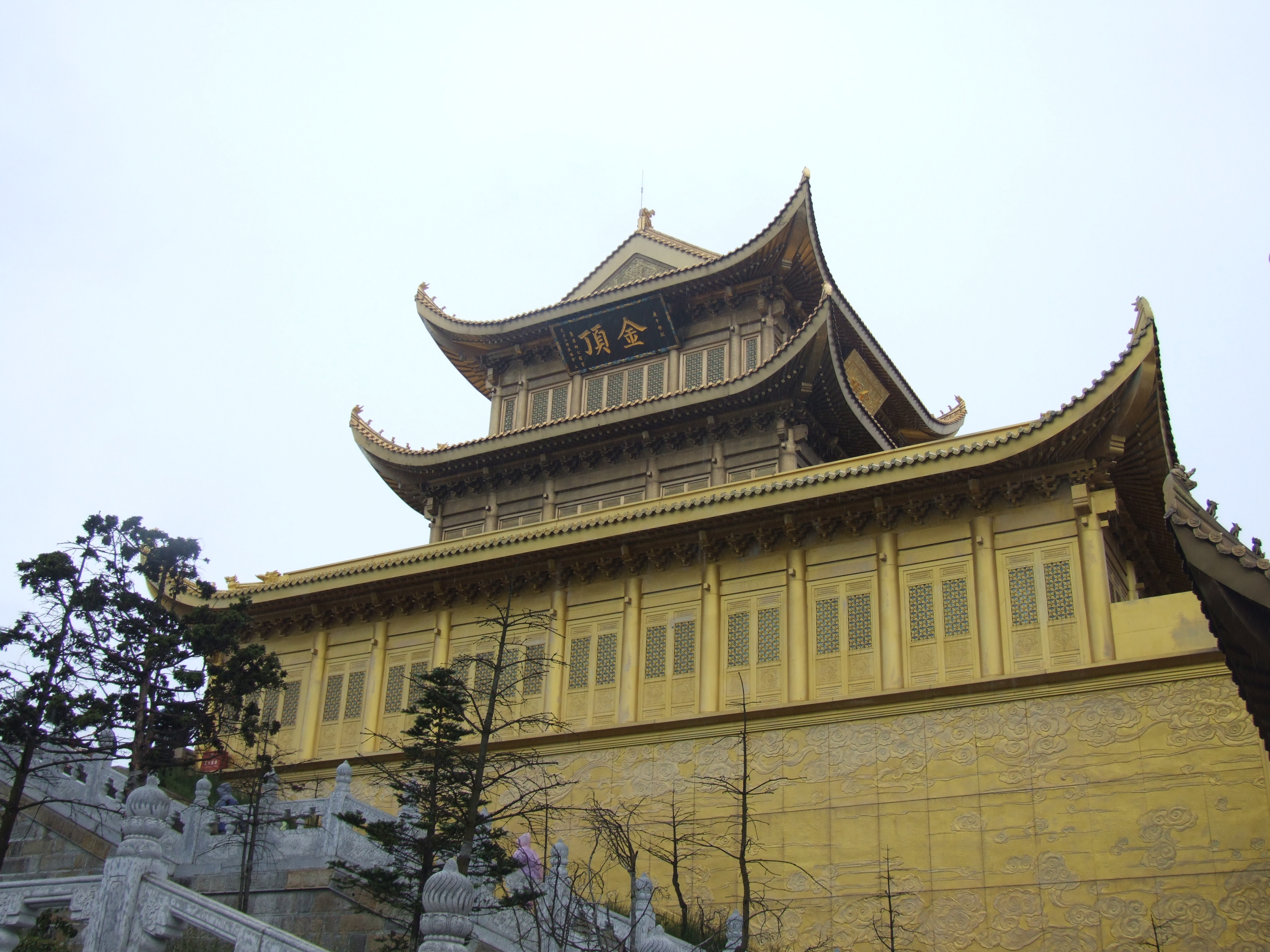
- The Puxian Hall at Jinding

Religion
- Affiliation: Buddhism

Location
- Location: Mount Emei, Sichuan, China
- Interactive map of Jinding
- Coordinates: 29°31′32″N 103°20′12″E

Architecture
- Completed: 1377

Jinding
- Traditional Chinese: 金頂
- Simplified Chinese: 金顶
- Literal meaning: Golden Summit
Transcriptions
Standard Mandarin
- Hanyu Pinyin: Jīndǐng
- Bopomofo: ㄐㄧㄣ ㄉㄧㄥˇ
Yue: Cantonese
- Yale Romanization: Gāmdéng

Huazang Temple
- Traditional Chinese: 華藏寺
- Simplified Chinese: 华藏寺
Transcriptions
Standard Mandarin
- Hanyu Pinyin: Huázàng sì
- Bopomofo: ㄏㄨㄚˊㄗㄤˋㄙˋ
Yue: Cantonese
- Yale Romanization: Wàhjohng jih

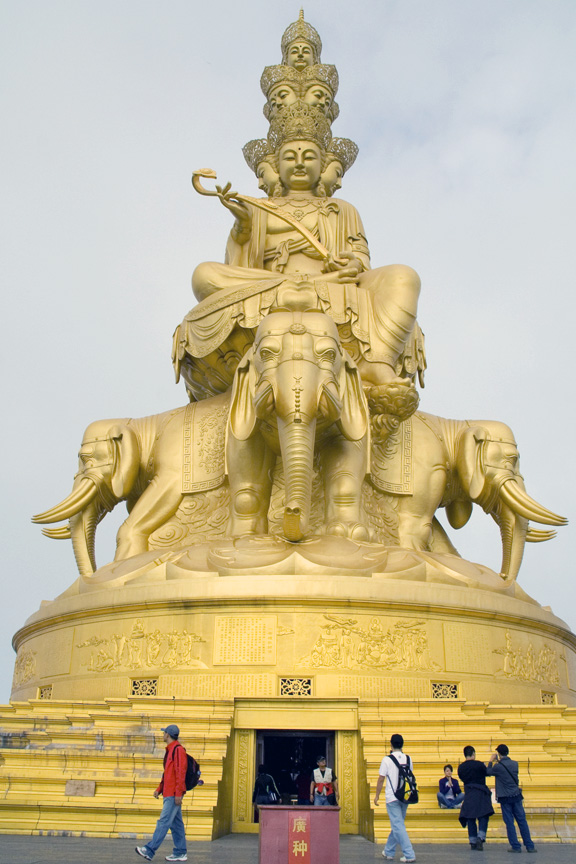
The Ten-faced Puxian stupa

The Jinding (Chinese: 金顶; pinyin: Jīndǐng; lit. 'Golden Summit'), elevation 3,077 metres (10,095 ft), is the main peak of Mount Emei, a UNESCO World Heritage Site in Sichuan, China. It is also a common name for the Buddhist Huazang Temple (Chinese: 华藏寺; pinyin: Huázàng sì) built on the summit. Jinding is the highest Buddhist temple in traditionally Han areas of China.

Jinding is known for its "four wonders": the sunrise, the sea of clouds, the "Buddhist halo", and the "divine light".

== History ==
The Huazang Temple was originally built in 1377 during the Ming dynasty, but has been rebuilt multiple times because of fire. The most recent incident happened in 1972, during the Cultural Revolution, when the temple was used for transmitting signals of a local television station. On April 8 at 9:30am, flames caused by a power generator quickly engulfed the wooden temple. The fire burned for two days, destroying countless precious Buddhist relics as well as numerous trees. The only remaining relics are a bronze monument and a bronze doorway from the Ming dynasty, and a bronze statue from the Qing dynasty.

In 2004, as part of the Jinding "Revival and Renovation Plan" by the Mt. Emei Buddhist Association, the Huazang Temple was rebuilt along with a 48-meter-tall stupa of the "Ten-faced Puxian Bodhisattva" (Samantabhadra). The rebuilt temple was officially opened on 18 June 2006. 300 notable Buddhist monks attended the grand ceremony, as well as 3,000 visitors. The reconstruction is seen as a prestigious project for the local authorities, and has helped to attract tourists and religious pilgrims alike. However, it has also been criticized as an attempt to increase revenue. The new structures have been called "inauthentic" and purely "invented".

In March 2016, the Puxian stupa was temporarily closed for renovation. The authorities plan to cover the stupa with 160,000 gold leaves, at a cost of CN¥20 million.

== Structures ==
The complex is built along a central axis on a slope, from the lowest to the highest are the stupa, the main hall and the Puxian hall.

The Ten-faced Puxian Stupa stands 48 metres (157 ft) tall, weighs 660 tons and is surrounded by urns containing the ashes of Buddhists. On one side, the bodhisattva holds a ruyi, while on the other, his hands forms the Dhyana Mudra meditation gesture. Inside the stupa is a statue of Maitreya. The stupa was designed by the Taiwanese architect Chu-Yuan Lee.

The Grand Hall of the Great Sage (Chinese: 大雄宝殿; pinyin: Dàxióng Bǎodiàn; or Mahavira Hall) is the main hall, housing statues of the Gautama Buddha and two disciples.

The Puxian Hall (Chinese: 普贤殿; pinyin: Pǔxián diàn), built in 1615, is located behind the main hall at the highest point, and is over 8 metres (26 ft) tall.

== Gallery ==
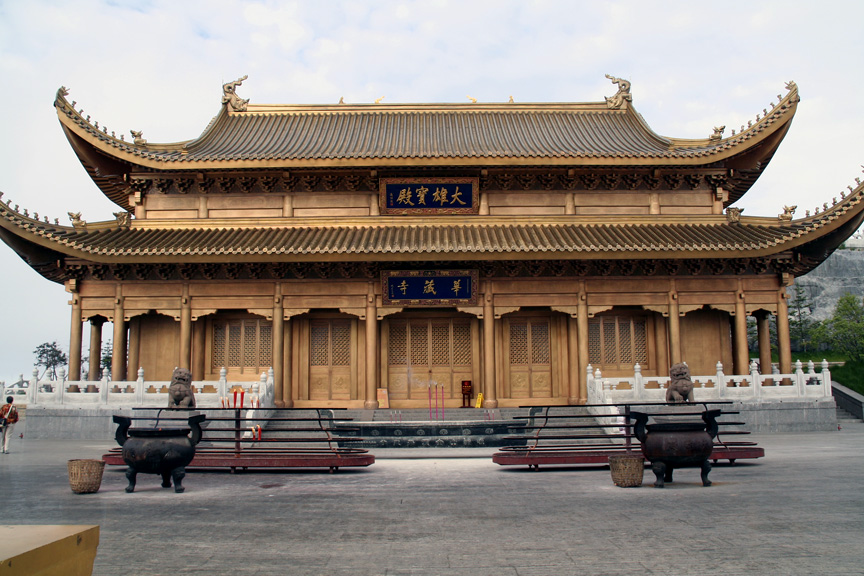
Grand Hall of the Great Sage

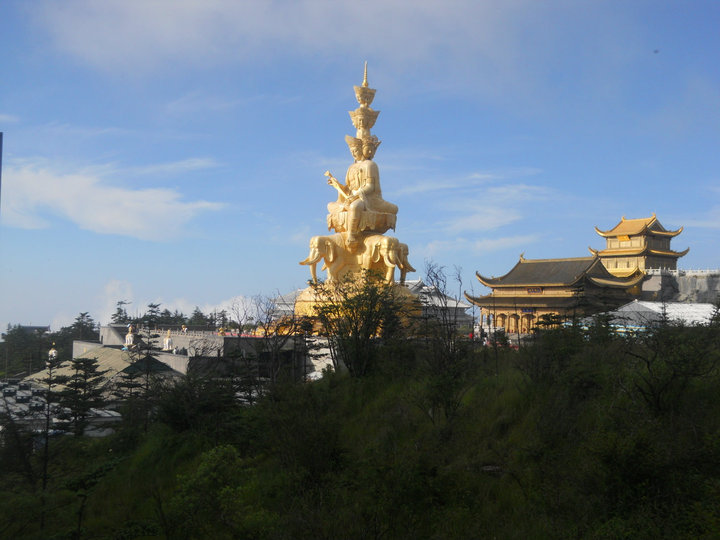
Golden Summit

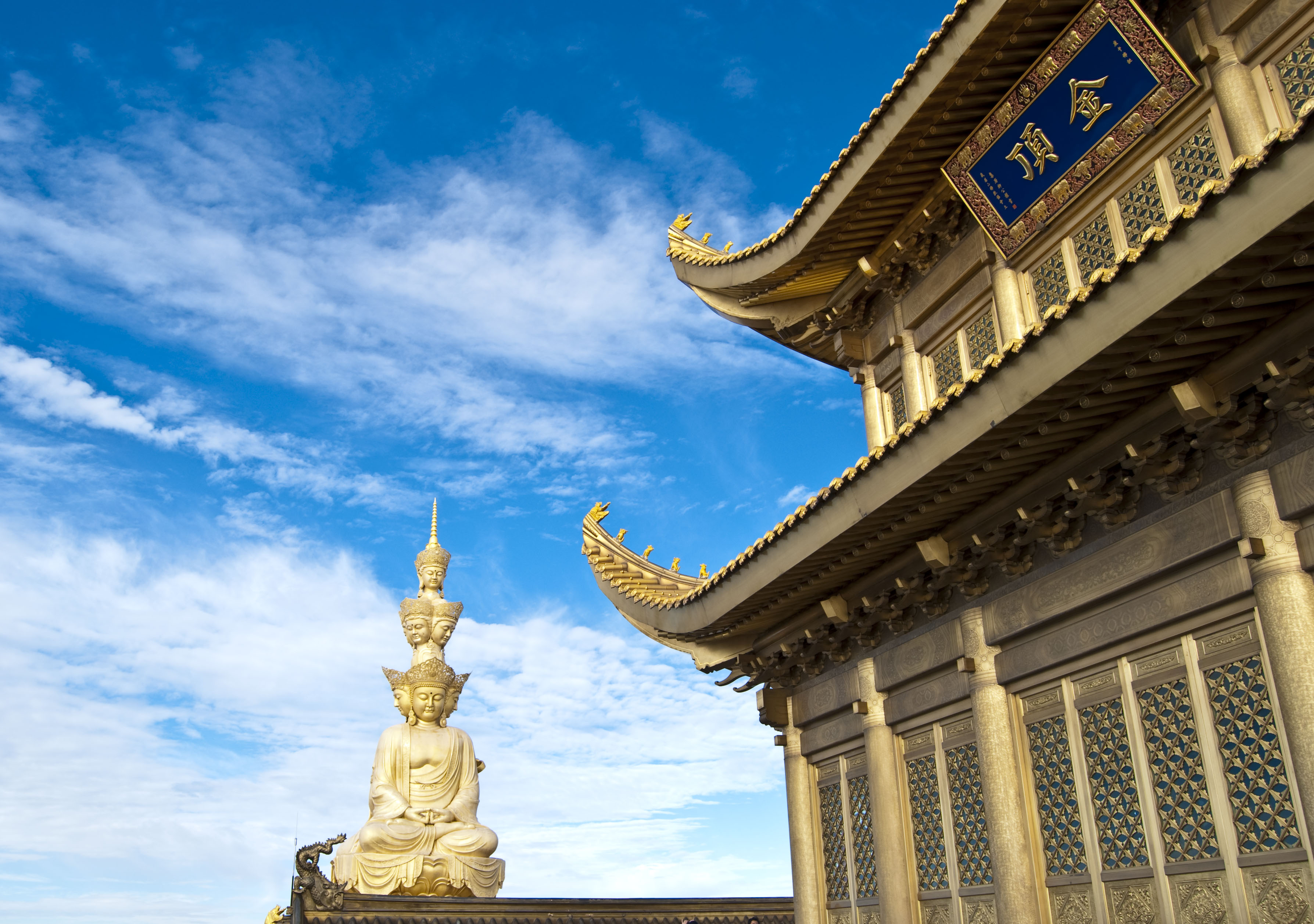
Puxian Hall
