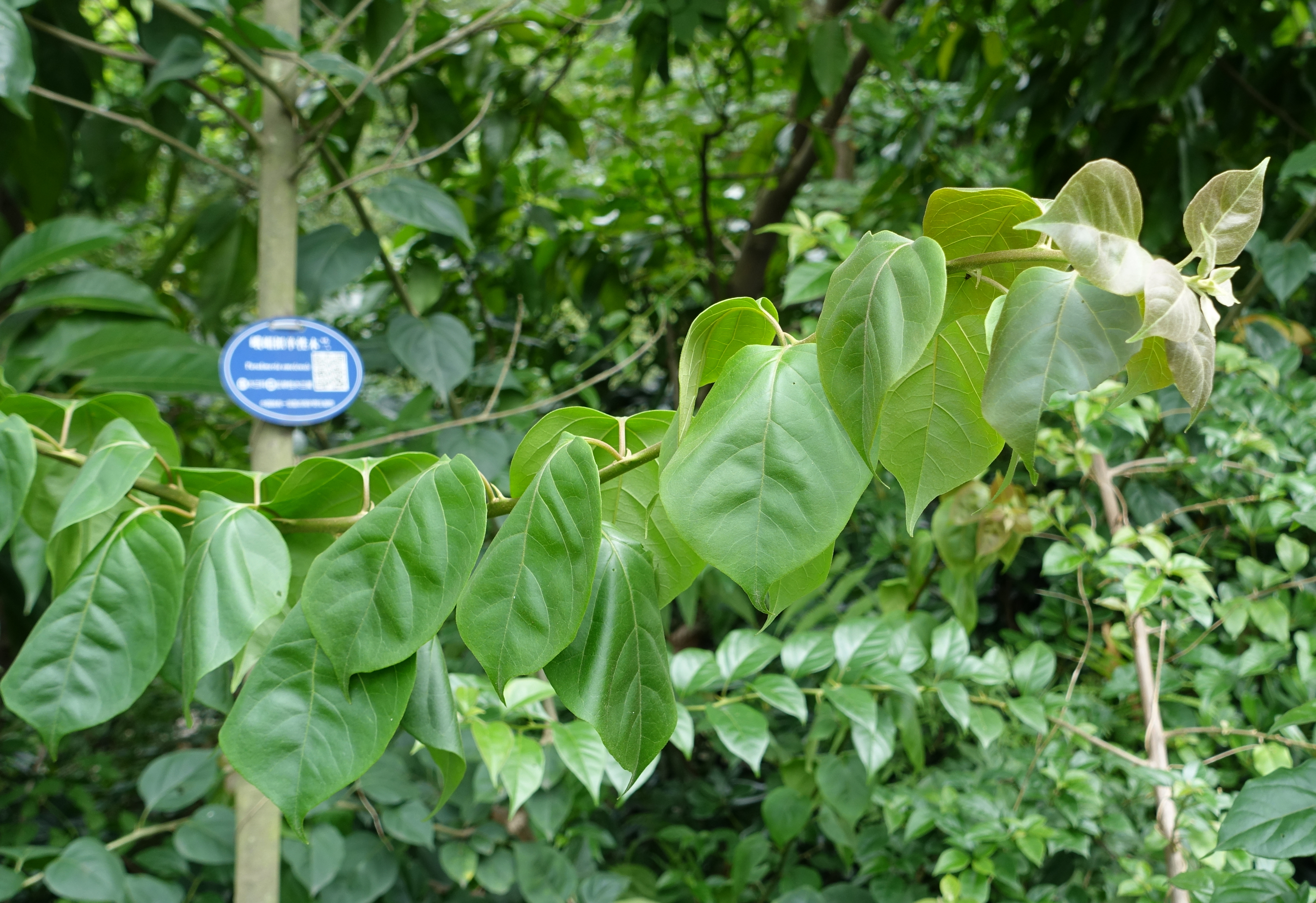

Conservation status
- Critically Endangered (IUCN 3.1)

Scientific classification
- Kingdom: Plantae
- Clade: Tracheophytes
- Clade: Angiosperms
- Clade: Magnoliids
- Order: Magnoliales
- Family: Magnoliaceae
- Genus: Magnolia
- Subgenus: Magnolia subg. Gynopodium
- Section: Magnolia sect. Gynopodium
- Species: M. omeiensis

Binomial name
- Magnolia omeiensis (W.C.Cheng) Dandy

Synonyms
- Pachylarnax omeiensis (W.C.Cheng) Sima & S.G.Lu; Parakmeria omeiensis W.C.Cheng

= Magnolia omeiensis =

Species of flowering plant

Magnolia omeiensis is a species of plant in the family Magnoliaceae. It is a tree endemic to Mount Emei in Sichuan province of south-central China. It is threatened by habitat loss.

The species was first described as Parakmeria omeiensis by Wan-Chun Cheng in 1951. In 1974 James Edgar Dandy placed it in genus Magnolia as M. omeiensis.
