= Emeishan City =

Emeishan 峨眉山市
- County-level city
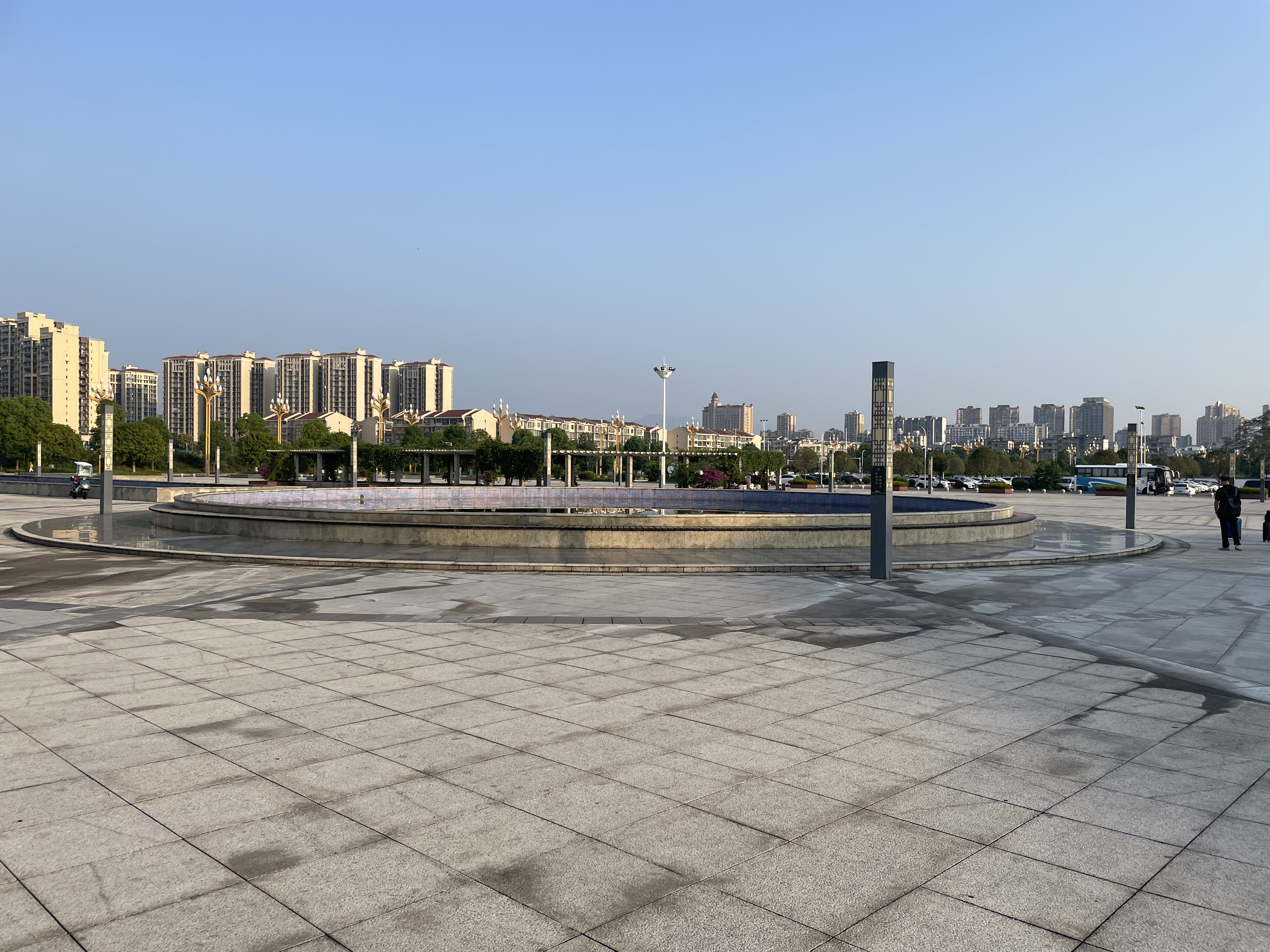
- Skyline of Emeishan City from Emei railway station

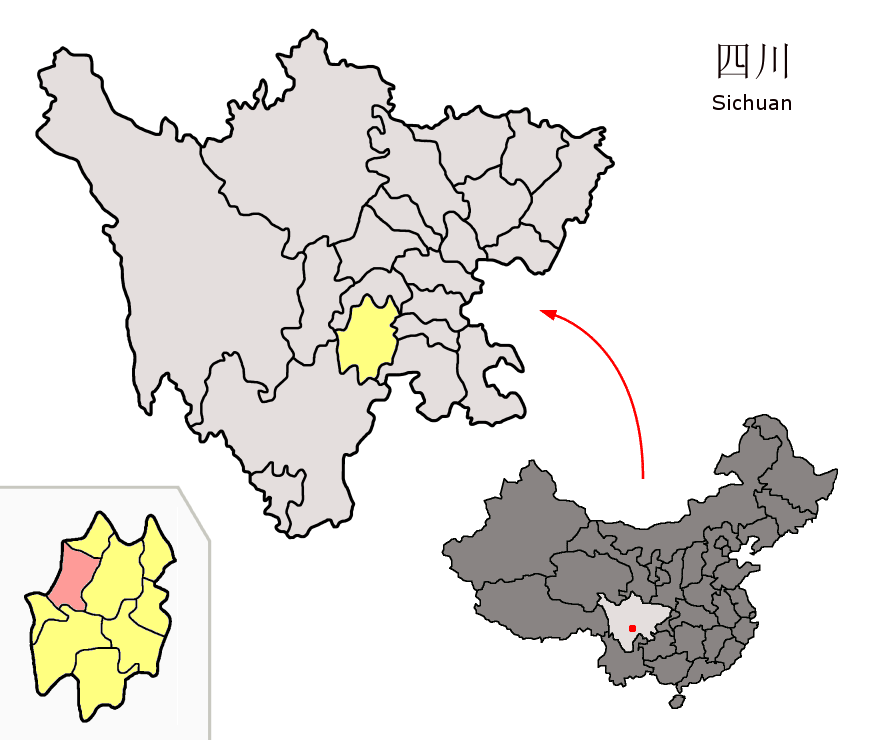
- Location of Emeishan City (red) in Leshan City (yellow) and Sichuan

- Location of the city centre in Sichuan
- Coordinates: 29.601°N 103.482°E
- Country: China
- Province: Sichuan
- Prefecture-level city: Leshan
- Municipal seat: Suishan

Area
  - County-level city: 1,151.4 km^{2} (444.6 sq mi)
- Highest elevation (Mount Emei): 3,099 m (10,167 ft)

Population (2020)
  - County-level city: 419,107
  - Density: 364.00/km^{2} (942.75/sq mi)
  - Urban: 252,682
- Time zone: UTC+8 (China Standard Time)

Emeishan
- Chinese: 峨眉山
- Postal: Omei
Transcriptions
Standard Mandarin
- Hanyu Pinyin: Éméishān
- Wade–Giles: E^{2}-mei^{2}-shan^{1}

Emeishan (Chinese: 峨眉山市; pinyin: Éméishān Shì) is a county-level city in Sichuan province, China. It is administered by the prefecture-level city Leshan. Its population in 2020 stood at 419,107. It is named after Mount Emei, a famous mountain located within its administration.

== Administrative divisions ==
Emeishan comprises 2 subdistricts, 10 towns and 1 township:

subdistricts

- Shengli 胜利街道
- Eshan 峨山街道

towns

- Suishan 绥山镇
- Gaoqiao 高桥镇
- Luomu 罗目镇
- Jiuli 九里镇
- Longchi 龙池镇
- Fuxi 符溪镇
- Shuangfu 双福镇
- Guihuaqiao 桂花桥镇
- Dawei 大为镇
- Huangwan 黄湾镇

township

- Longmen 龙门乡

== Climate ==
Climate data for Emeishan City, elevation 424 m (1,391 ft), (1991–2020 normals, extremes 1981–present)
Month	Jan	Feb	Mar	Apr	May	Jun	Jul	Aug	Sep	Oct	Nov	Dec	Year
Record high °C (°F)	20.9 (69.6)	23.4 (74.1)	31.3 (88.3)	33.4 (92.1)	35.9 (96.6)	36.1 (97.0)	37.8 (100.0)	41.4 (106.5)	36.5 (97.7)	29.4 (84.9)	25.2 (77.4)	19.5 (67.1)	41.4 (106.5)
Mean daily maximum °C (°F)	9.9 (49.8)	12.9 (55.2)	17.8 (64.0)	23.4 (74.1)	27.0 (80.6)	29.1 (84.4)	31.2 (88.2)	30.9 (87.6)	26.4 (79.5)	21.2 (70.2)	16.7 (62.1)	11.3 (52.3)	21.5 (70.7)
Daily mean °C (°F)	7.1 (44.8)	9.6 (49.3)	13.7 (56.7)	18.6 (65.5)	22.2 (72.0)	24.6 (76.3)	26.6 (79.9)	26.2 (79.2)	22.5 (72.5)	18.1 (64.6)	13.7 (56.7)	8.6 (47.5)	17.6 (63.8)
Mean daily minimum °C (°F)	5.2 (41.4)	7.2 (45.0)	10.7 (51.3)	15.0 (59.0)	18.6 (65.5)	21.3 (70.3)	23.2 (73.8)	22.9 (73.2)	20.0 (68.0)	16.0 (60.8)	11.7 (53.1)	6.8 (44.2)	14.9 (58.8)
Record low °C (°F)	−1.5 (29.3)	−0.3 (31.5)	0.2 (32.4)	6.2 (43.2)	10.3 (50.5)	15.1 (59.2)	18.2 (64.8)	16.6 (61.9)	13.6 (56.5)	5.0 (41.0)	2.6 (36.7)	−2.0 (28.4)	−2.0 (28.4)
Average precipitation mm (inches)	15.7 (0.62)	23.1 (0.91)	42.1 (1.66)	90.9 (3.58)	122.7 (4.83)	151.6 (5.97)	320.4 (12.61)	352.2 (13.87)	156.3 (6.15)	64.8 (2.55)	34.1 (1.34)	16.4 (0.65)	1,390.3 (54.74)
Average precipitation days (≥ 0.1 mm)	10.9	11.5	14.9	15.6	16.0	17.2	16.7	16.6	17.8	17.6	11.6	10.2	176.6
Average snowy days	0.7	0.2	0	0	0	0	0	0	0	0	0	0.2	1.1
Average relative humidity (%)	80	77	73	71	69	74	77	78	80	82	80	81	77
Mean monthly sunshine hours	31.9	40.3	68.7	95.6	104.8	93.7	118.5	127.8	56.4	33.7	39.8	29.7	840.9
Percentage possible sunshine	10	13	18	25	25	22	28	32	15	10	13	9	18
Source: China Meteorological Administration all-time extreme temperature all-time January high

== Transport ==
- Emei railway station
- Emeishan railway station
