= Baoguo Temple =

Baoguo Temple (simplified Chinese: 报国寺; traditional Chinese: 報國寺; pinyin: Bàoguó Sì) or (simplified Chinese: 保国寺; traditional Chinese: 保國寺; pinyin: Bǎoguó Sì), may refer to:

- Baoguo Temple (Zhejiang), in Ningbo, Zhejiang, China
- Baoguo Temple (Mount Emei), on Mount Emei, Sichuan, China
