= Shengji Temple Bronze Pagoda =

- 聖積寺銅塔 (Chinese)
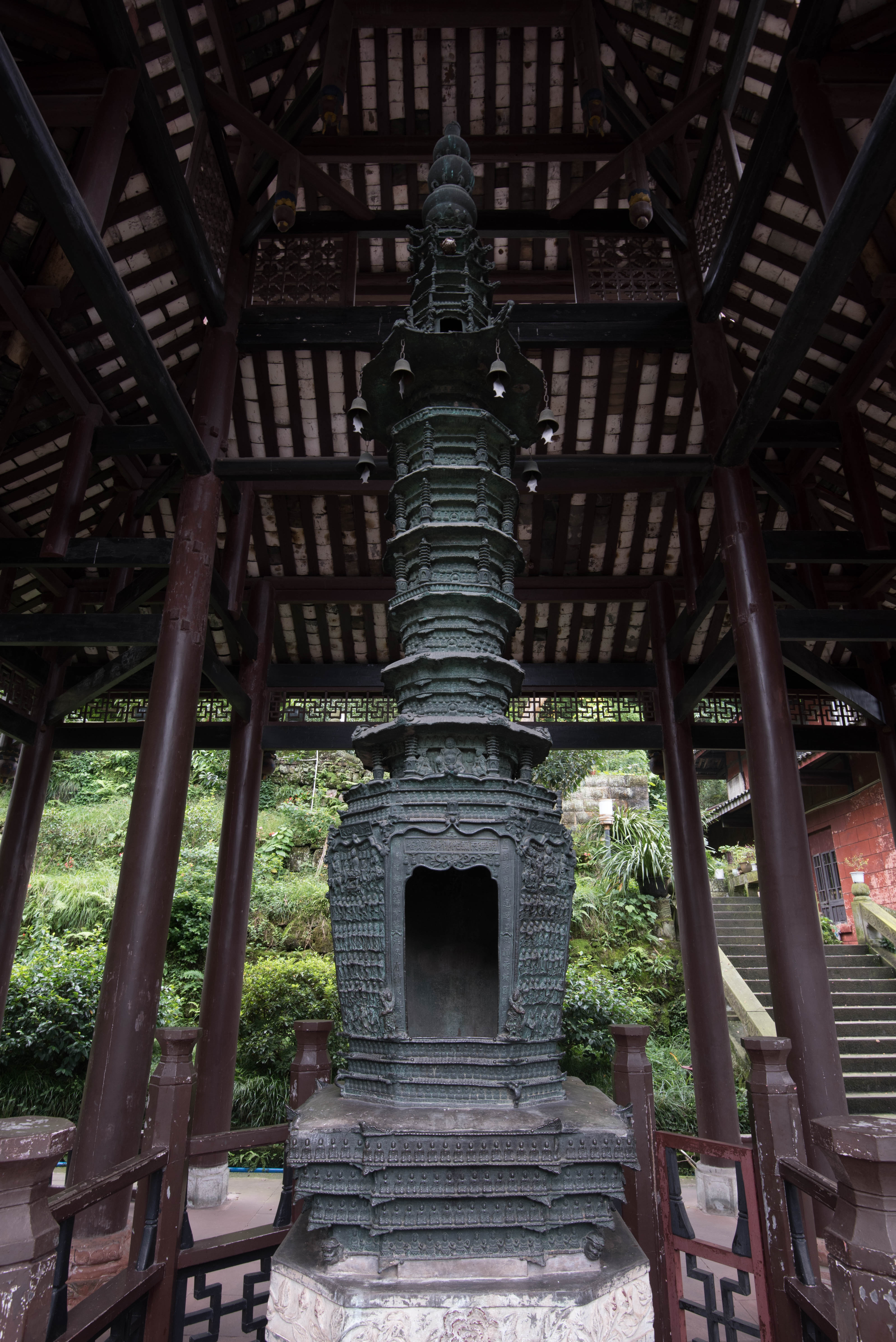
- The Pagoda within the Pavilion
- Type: Major Historical and Cultural Site of China
- Location: Fuhu Temple, Mount Emei, China

History
- Built: Ming Dynasty

Shengji Temple Bronze Pagoda (Chinese: 聖積寺銅塔) is located in Fuhu Temple, Mount Emei, Sichuan. It is named for its original location in Shengji Temple. The pagoda, also known as the Huayan Bronze Pagoda (Chinese: 華嚴寺銅塔), is cast with the text of the Avatamsaka Sutra and scenes depicting the seven places and nine assemblies (Chinese: 七處九會) where the Buddha is said to have preached. It is the earliest large-scale bronze pagoda still existing in China.

The bronze pagoda has eight sides and thirteen tiers, with a height of 5.8 meters. It combines the features of a Lama-style pagoda and a multi-eaved tower, and was originally built with a square pedestal resembling Mount Meru. The body of the pagoda has 4,762 buddha effigies and a wealth of inscriptions including the Avatamsaka Sutra. It also features motifs such as figures, lions and elephants.

== History ==
The Shenji Bronze Pagoda was built during the Wanli era of the Ming Dynasty and was supervised by Zen master Miaofeng, who was funded by the Wanli Emperor.

During the Great Leap Forward movement in 1958, the pagoda was transferred to Chongqing Iron and Steel Company to be smelted along with other metal relics. In 1959, the provincial communist committee stopped the action and transferred the pagoda to the Baoguo Temple in 1964. In 1980, the provincial cultural department funded the construction of a pavilion at Baoguo Temple to house the pagoda. The pagoda was eventually moved into the pavilion in April 1982.

In 2008, the Sichuan Earthquake damaged the pagoda.

== Protection ==
On August 16, 1956, the pagoda was listed as the first batch of historical and revolutionary cultural relics protection units in Sichuan Province. On July 7, 1980, when the second batch of Sichuan provincial cultural relics protection units was re-announced, it was merged into Fuhu Temple. On April 16, 1991, it was announced as the third batch of cultural relics protection units in Sichuan Province. In 2006, it was designated as one of the sixth batch of Major Historical and Cultural Site of China.

== Gallery ==
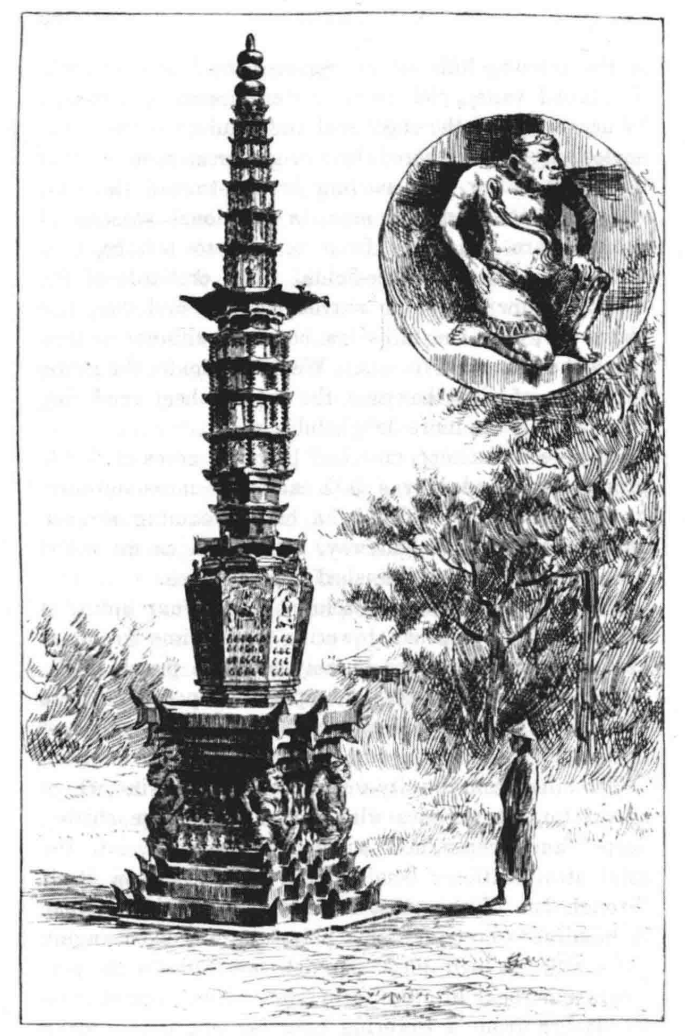
sketch by Virgil C. Hart depicting the pagoda in 1888

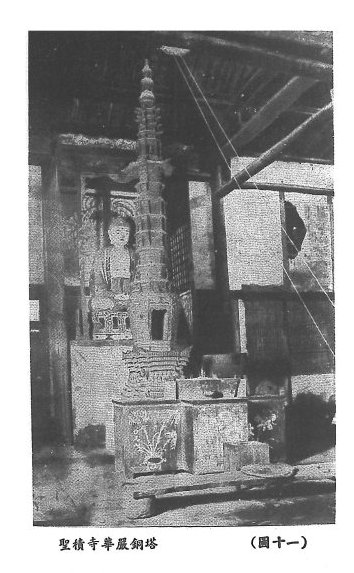
the Pagoda in 1930s

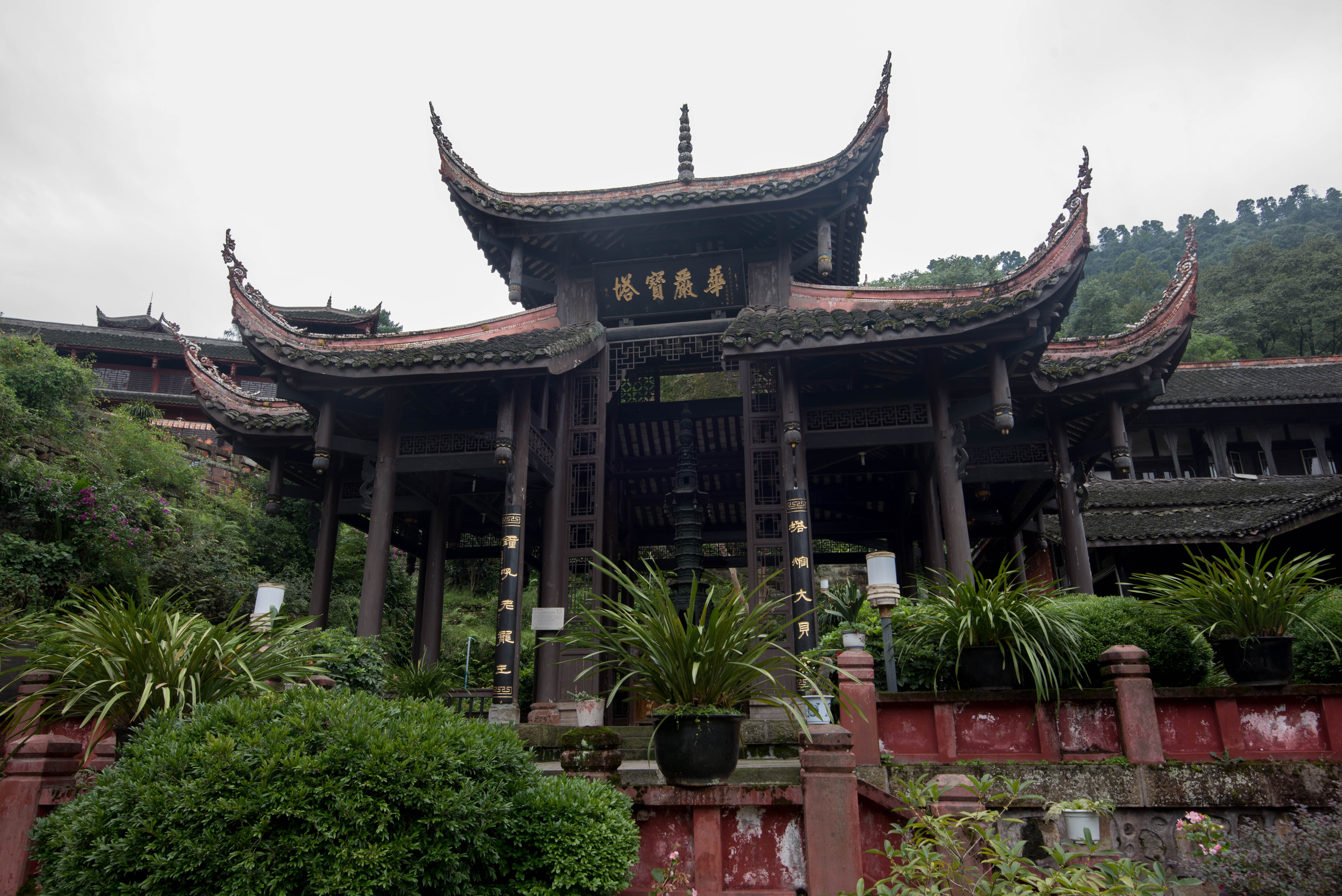
outside view of Huayan Pagoda Pavilion
