= Fuhu Temple =

Buddhist temple on the foothills of Mount Emei, China

- 伏虎寺 (Chinese)
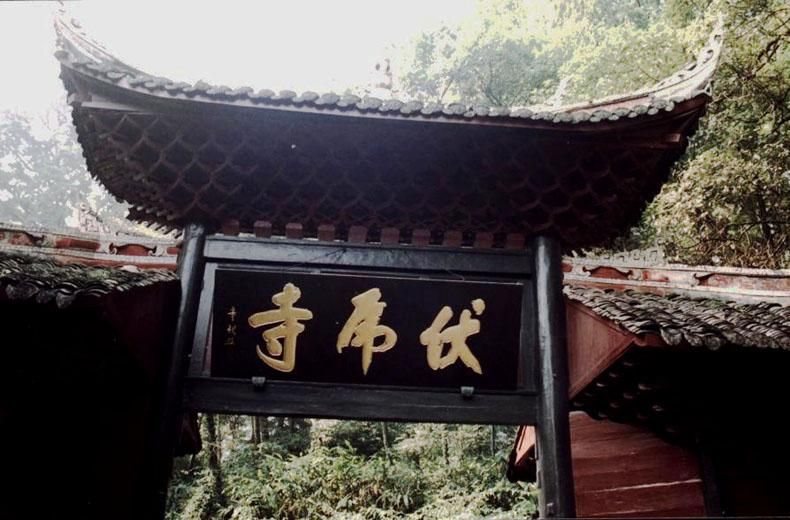
- Main gate
- Interactive map of Fuhu Temple
- 29.556206°N 103.415606°E
- Type: Buddhist temple

History
- Built: Tang dynasty

Fuhu Temple (Chinese: 伏虎寺; pinyin: Fúhǔ Sì) is an ancient Buddhist temple located in the foothills of Mount Emei in Sichuan Province, China. It has been a Provincial-Level Protected Cultural Relic of Sichuan Province since 2002, and a Nationally Protected Key Cultural Site of China since 2006.

The temple is built at the confluence of two rivers: the Yoga River (瑜伽河) and Tiger Creek (虎溪). It is close to Baoguo Temple.

== History ==
The temple was first built during the Tang dynasty. During the Song dynasty, the temple was expanded. At the beginning of the Qing dynasty (c. 1644), the temple was destroyed. Starting in 1651, a group of disciples rebuilt the temple over approximately twenty years. The current temple has thirteen halls and approximately 20,000 square meters. There is a gate, nave, main hall, library, and dormitories for monks.

In 1995, the Arhat Hall of the temple was rebuilt.

== Gallery ==
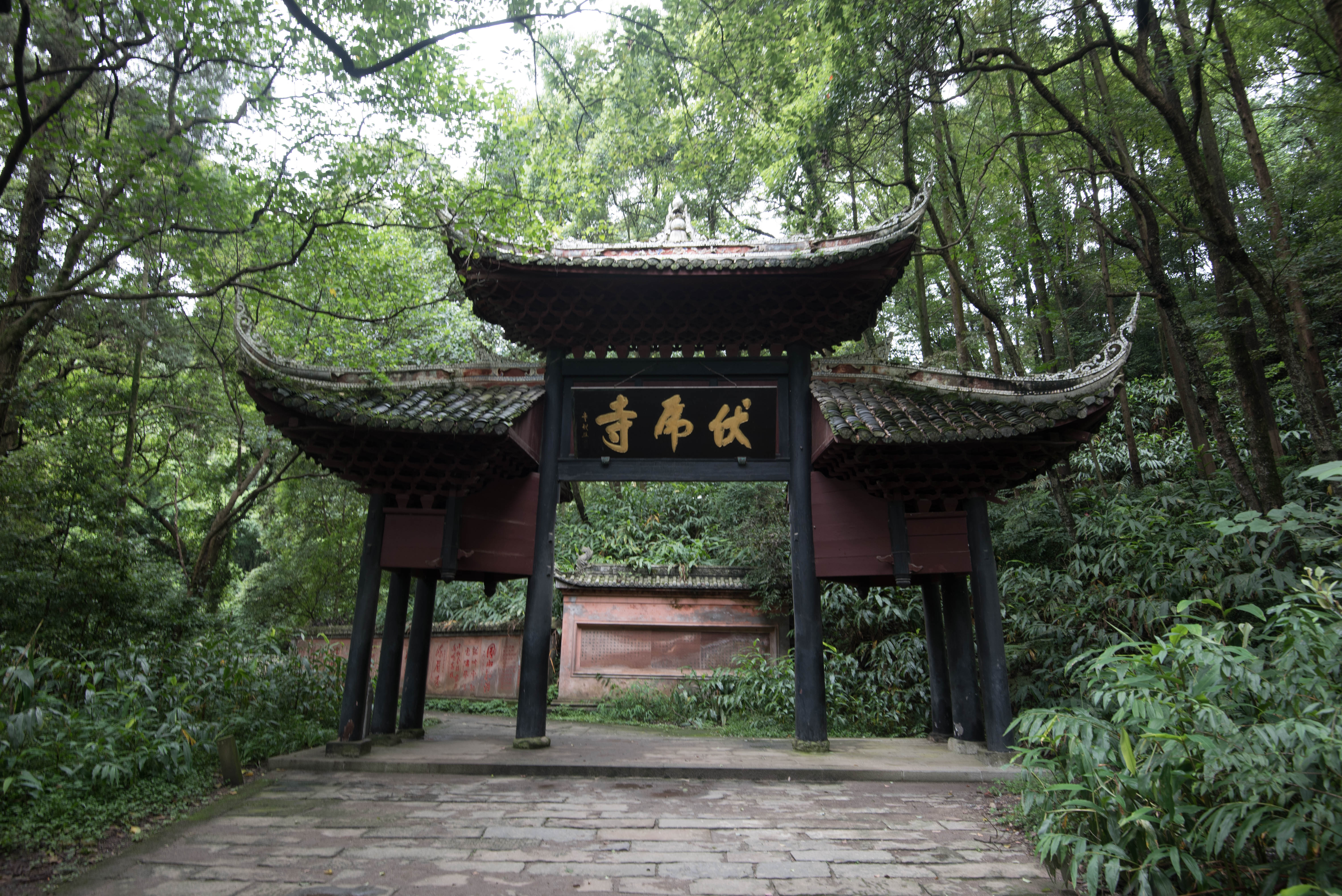
Main gate

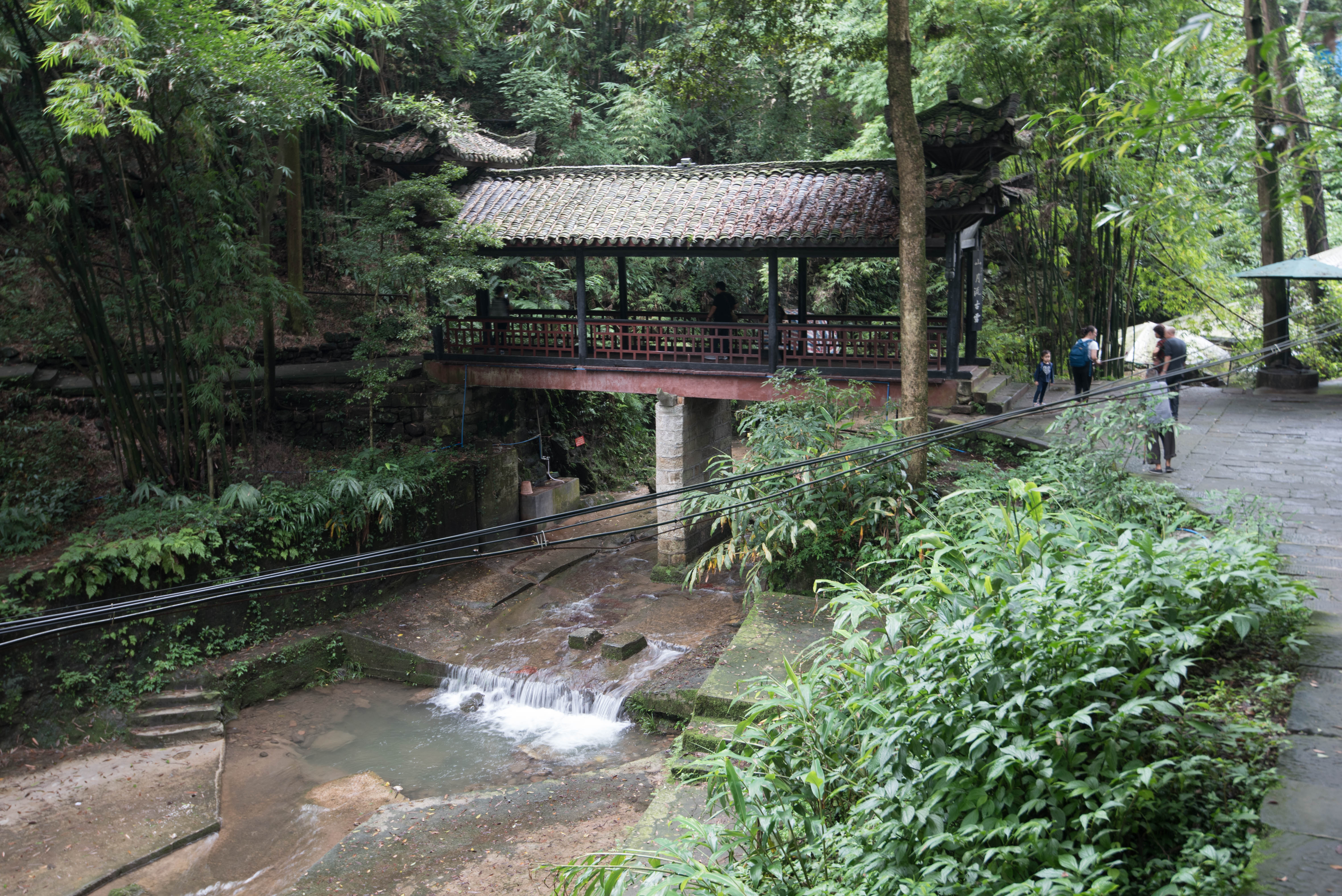
Bridge over stream

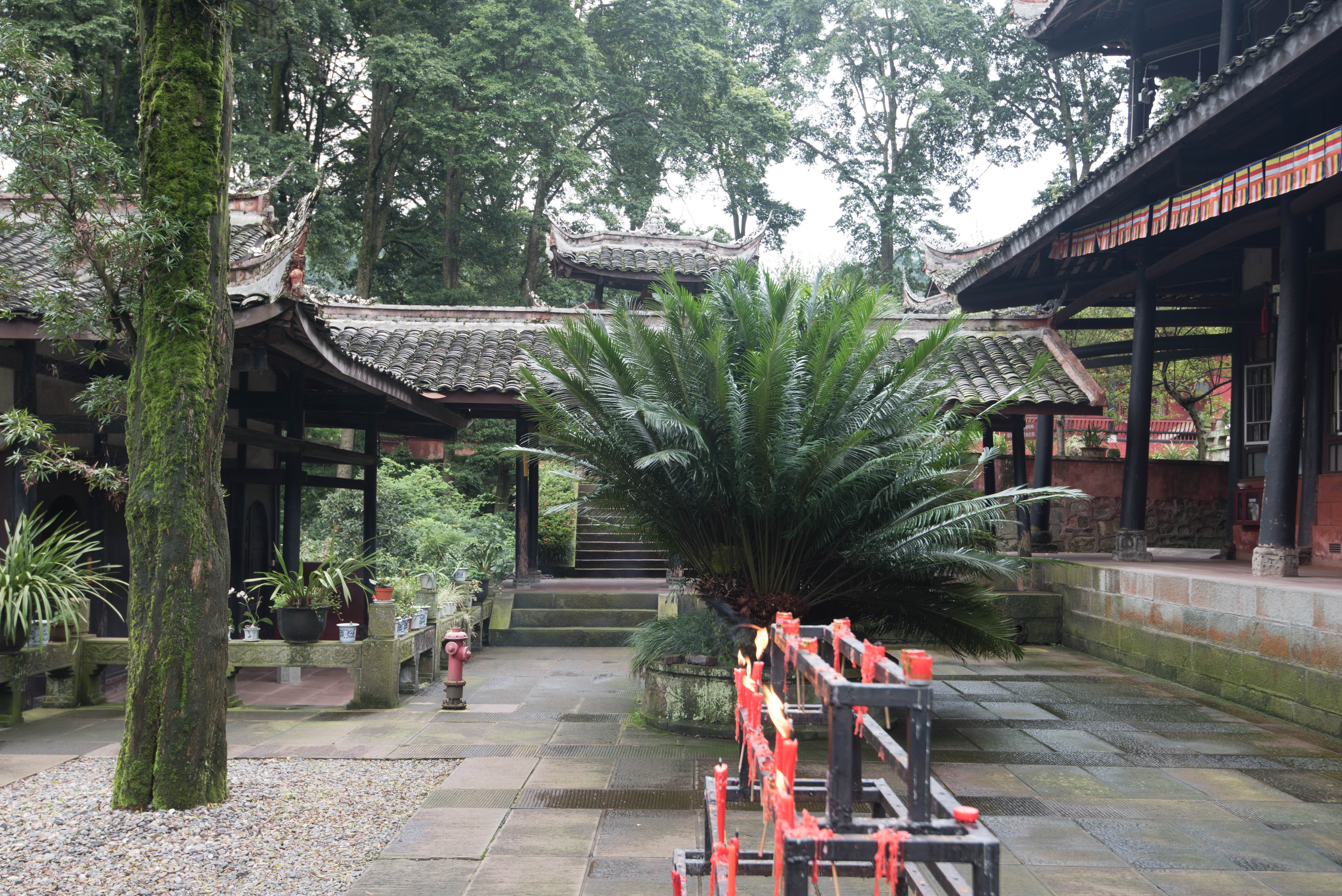
Courtyard

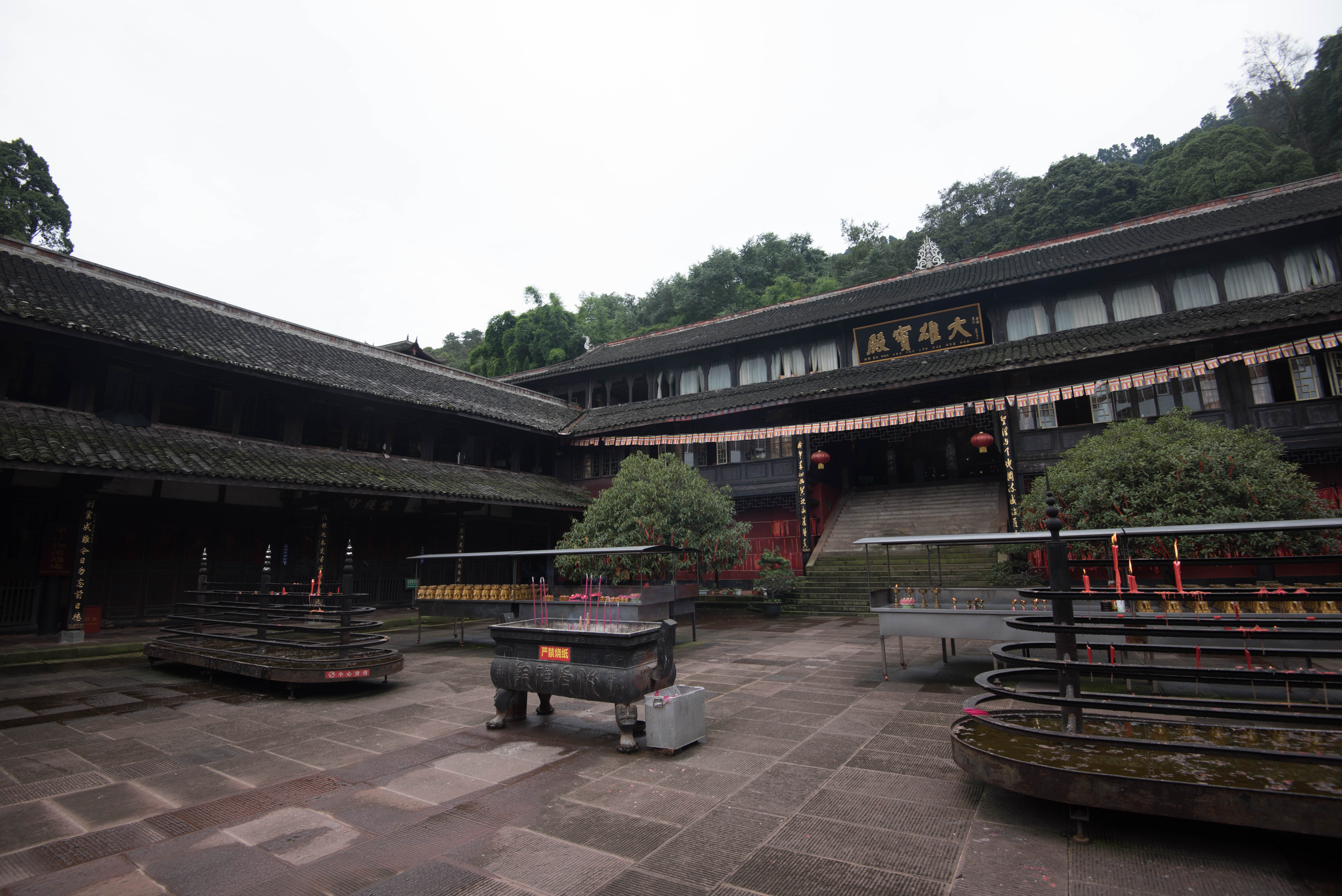
Incense and candles

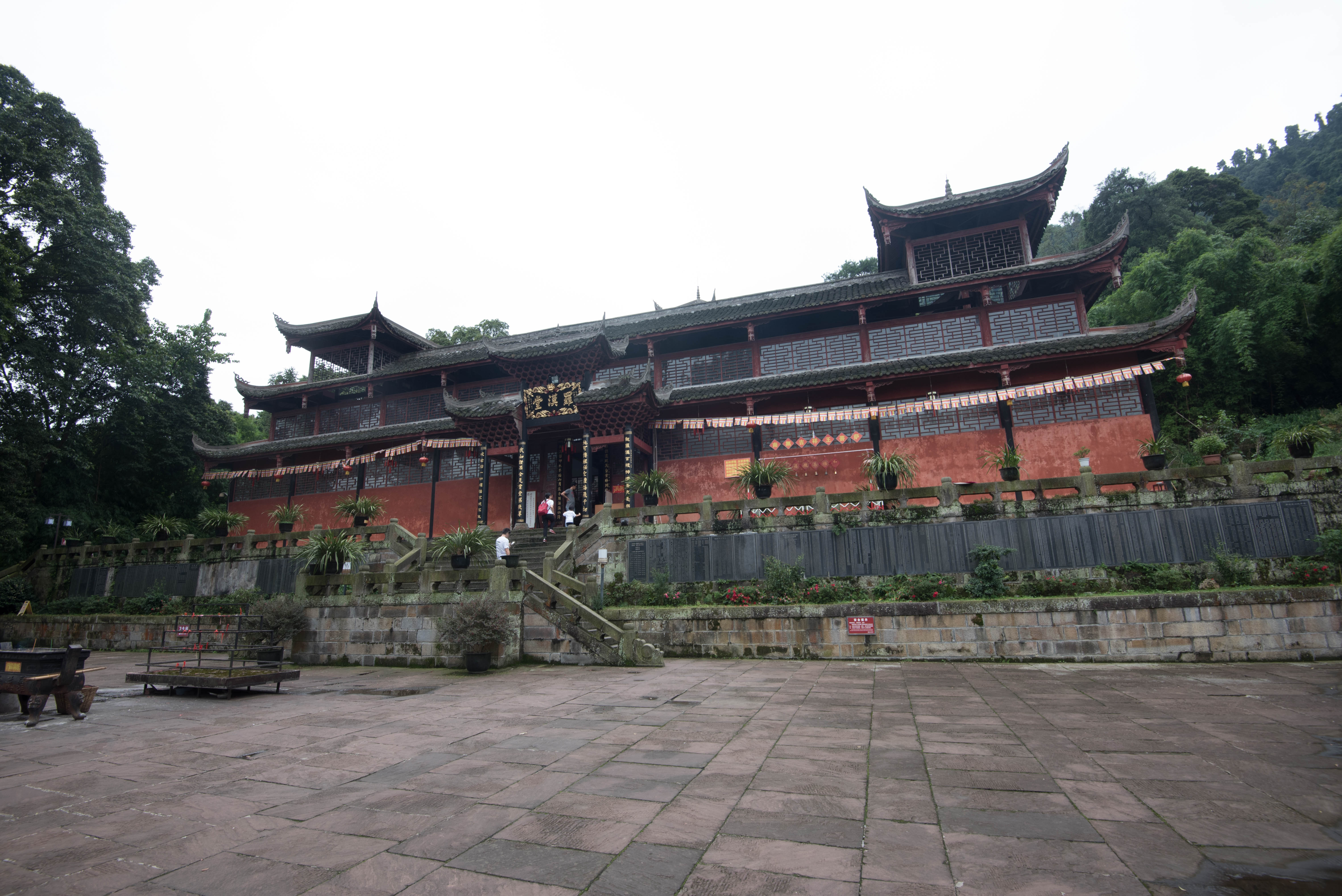
Arhat hall

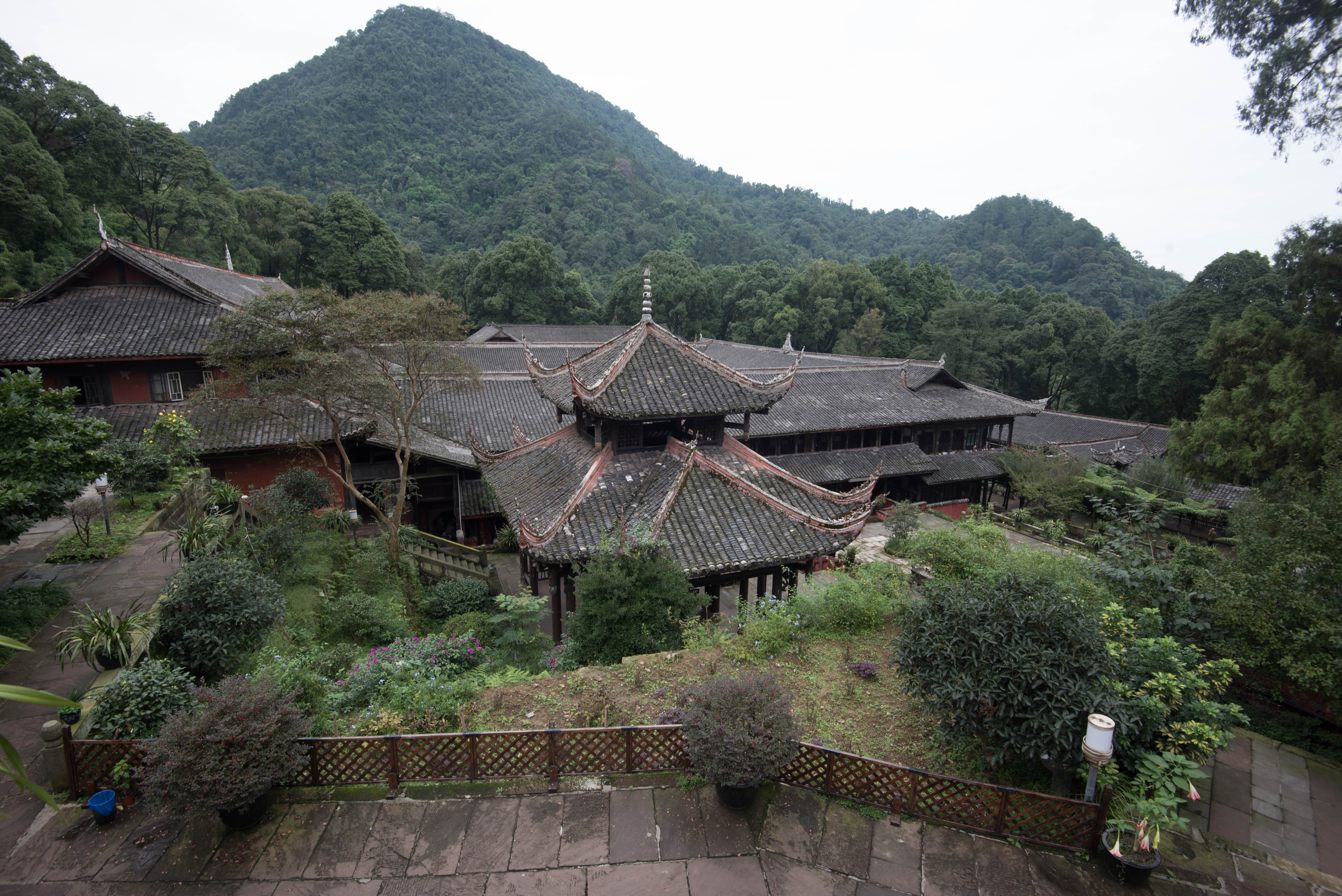
Smaller buildings

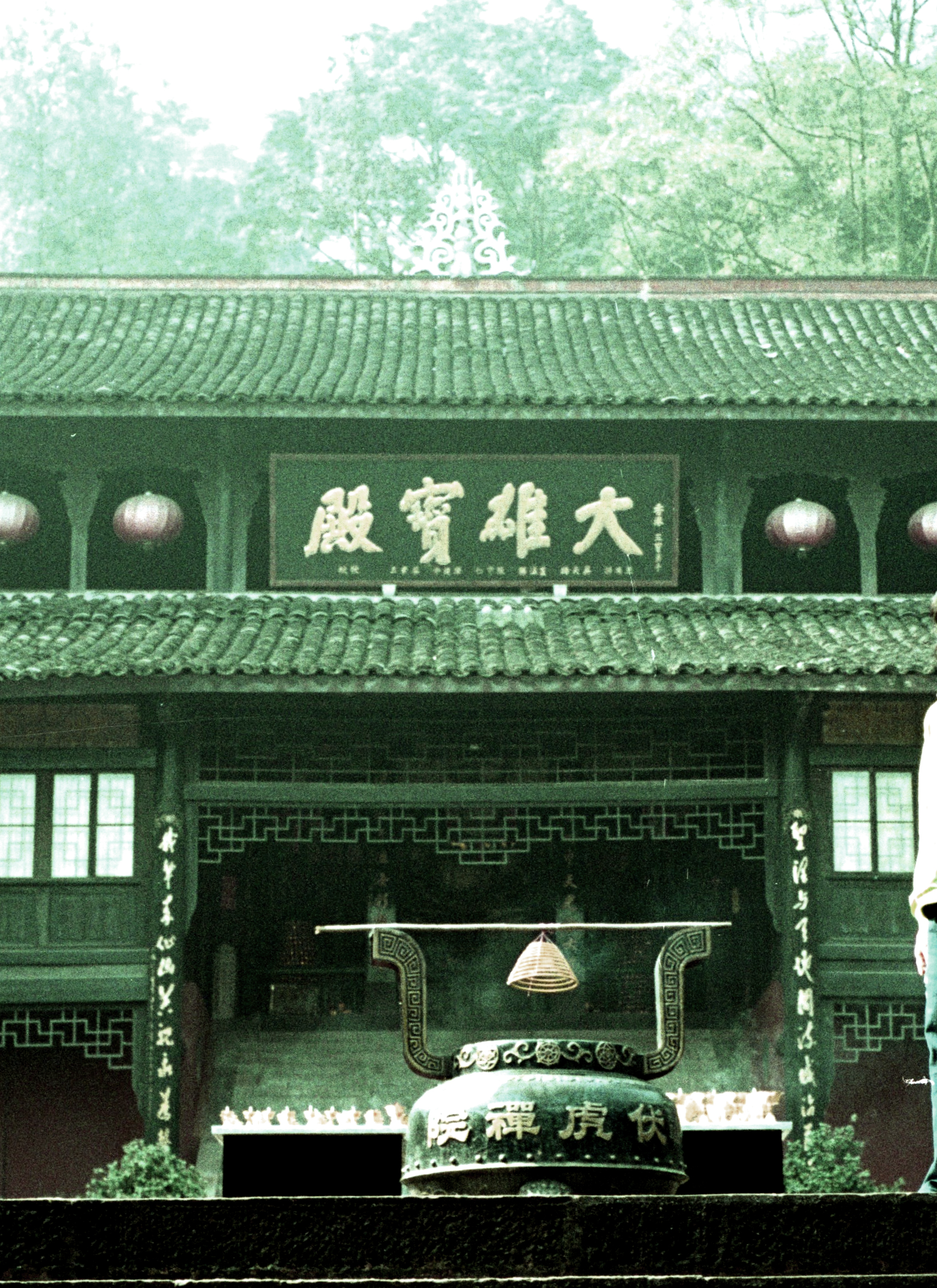
Daixong Hall
