= Baoguo Temple (Mount Emei) =

Buddhist temple on Mount Emei in Sichuan, China

- 报国寺
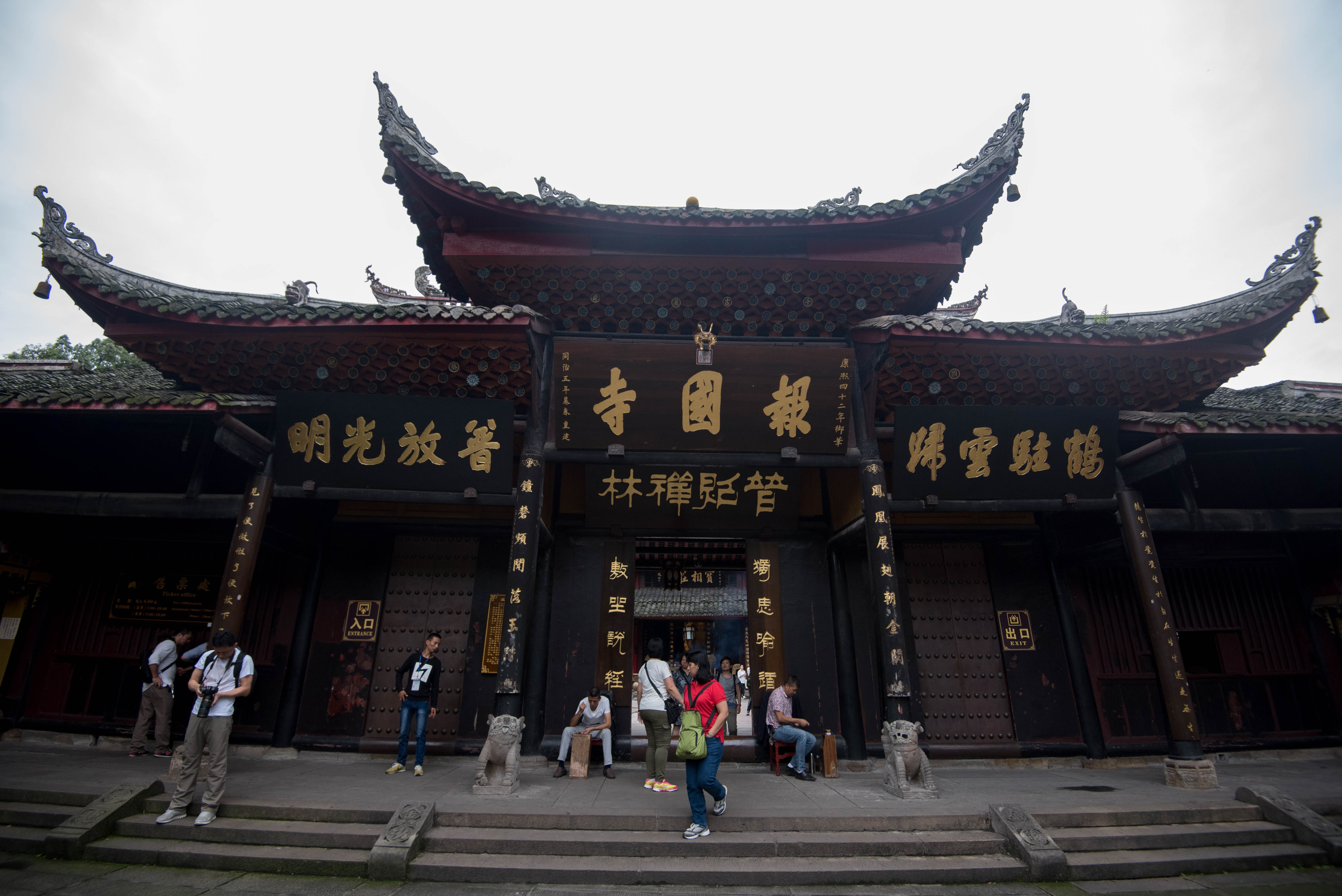
- The Shanmen at Baoguo Temple.

- Location within Sichuan Location within China

Religion
- Affiliation: Buddhism
- Leadership: Shi Yongshou (释永寿)

Location
- Location: Mount Emei, Sichuan
- Country: China
- Interactive map of Baoguo Temple
- Coordinates: 29°34′28″N 103°27′00″E

Architecture
- Style: Chinese architecture
- Founder: Mingguang (明光)
- Established: Wanli period (1573–1619)
- Completed: Wanli period (1573–1619)

Baoguo Temple (simplified Chinese: 报国寺; traditional Chinese: 報國寺; pinyin: Bàoguó Sì) is a Buddhist temple located on Mount Emei, in Emeishan City, Sichuan, China. It is the site of the Buddhist Association of Mount Emei. The temple mainly enshrines Buddhist Bodhisattvas as well as sages of Confucianism and deities of Taoism, which makes it a unique temple of three spiritual traditions.

== History ==
The temple traces its origins to the former Huizong Hall (会宗堂), founded by Mingguang (明光) in the Wanli period (1573–1619) of the Ming dynasty. During that time, the temple enshrines deities of the three religions with the Buddhist bodhisattva Puxian in the middle, Taoist deity Guangchengzi and Confucian sage Lu Tong on the left and right sides. This represents the prevailed idea of Three Teachings Harmonious as One in the Ming and Qing dynasties.

In the reign of Shunzhi Emperor in the Qing dynasty, monk Wenda (闻达) moved the temple to the present site.

In 1703, in the Kangxi era, Kangxi Emperor named it "Baoguo Temple".

The temple was enlarged in 1866 by monk Guanghui (广惠).

Baoguo Temple was inscribed as a National Key Buddhist Temple in Han Chinese Area by the State Council of China in 1983.

== Architecture ==
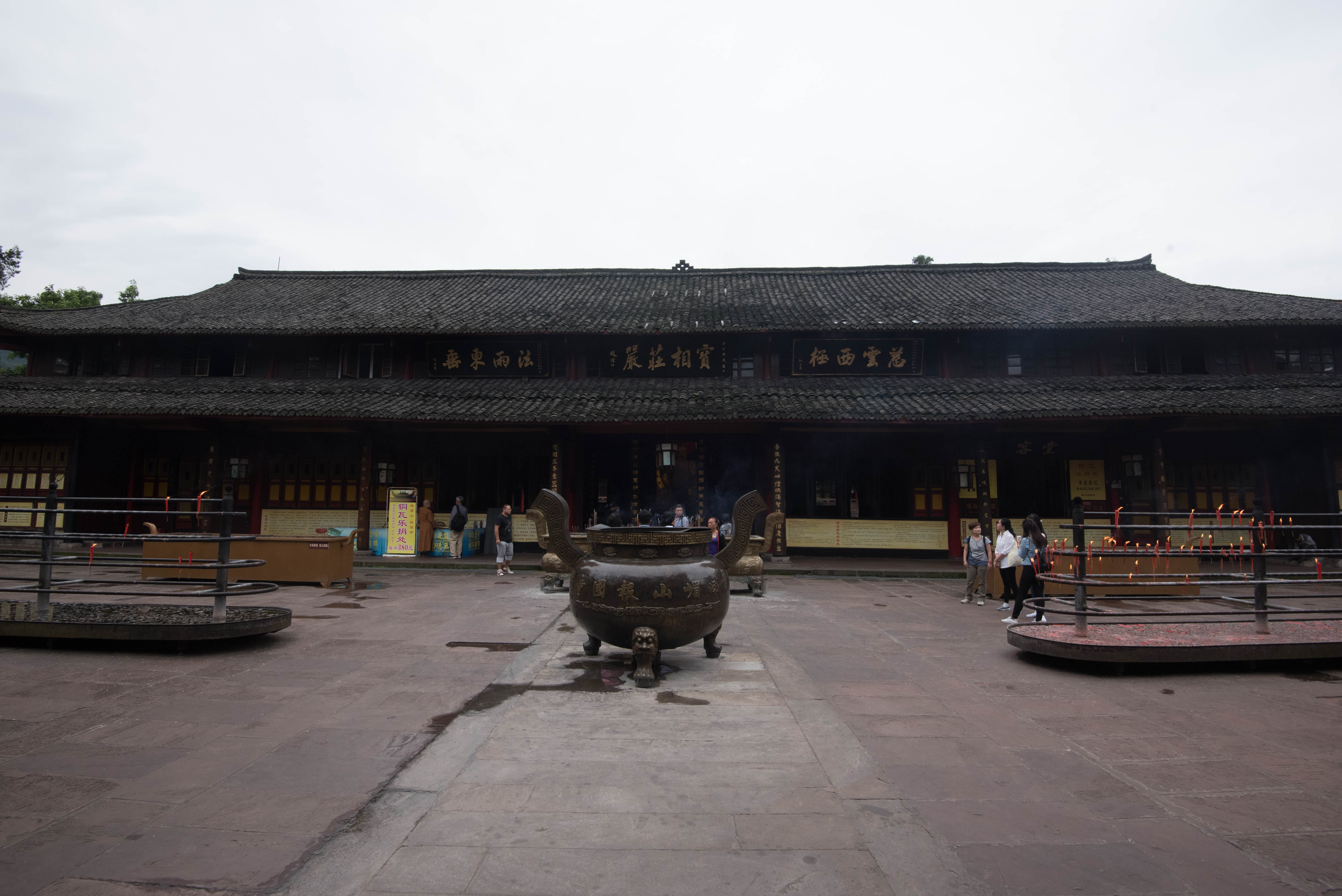
The Mahavira Hall.

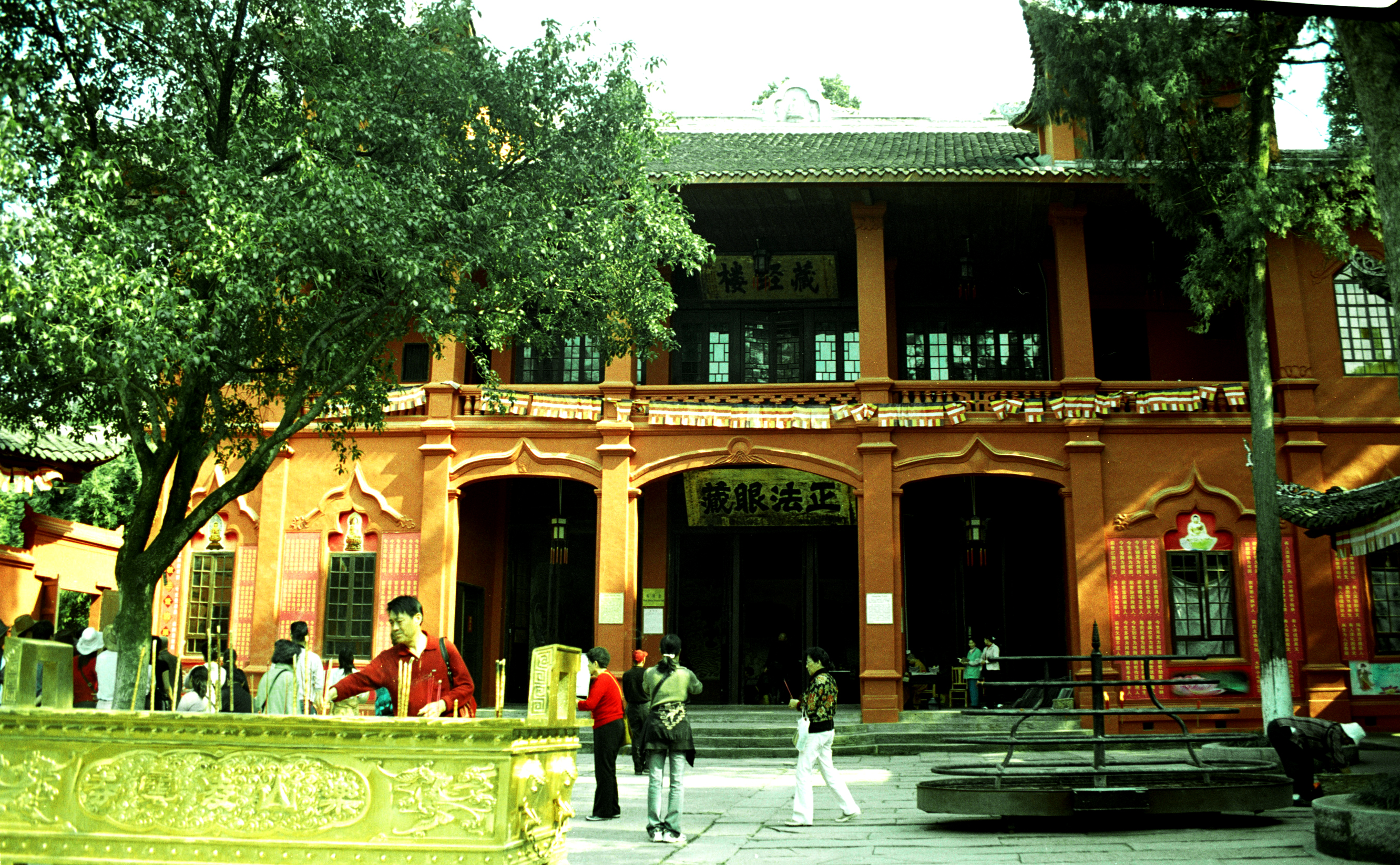
The Buddhist Texts Library

Now the existing main buildings include the Shanmen, Hall of Mi Le, Mahavira Hall, Seven Buddha Hall and Zangjing Ge.

=== Shanmen ===
Under the eaves is a plaque with the Chinese characters "Baoguo Temple" written by Kangxi Emperor and inscribed by calligrapher Wang Fan.

=== Hall of Mi Le ===
In the center of the hall enshrines the statue of Mi Le with the dharmapala Weituo standing at his back.

=== Mahavira Hall ===
The Mahavira Hall enshrining the Three Saints of Hua-yan (華嚴三聖). In the middle is Shijiamoni, statues of Wenshu and Puxian stand on the left and right sides of Sakyamuni's statue. The statues of Eighteen Arhats sitting on the seats before both sides of the gable walls.

=== Seven Buddha Hall ===
Behind the Mahavira Hall is the Seven Buddha Hall enshrining the statues of Kassapa Buddha, Kakusandha Buddha, Sikhī Buddha, Vipassī Buddha, Vessabhū Buddha, Koṇāgamana Buddha and Shijiamoni Buddha.

At the back of the hall are statues of the bodhisattvas Guanyin and Dashizhi. Longnü and Shancai are placed on the left and right sides.

=== Hall of Puxian ===
The Hall of Puxian houses a statue of Puxian on the back of white elephant.

=== Huayan Pagoda ===
A fourteen story, 6-metre (20 ft) tall, Ming dynasty bronze pagoda named "Huayan Pagoda" (华严塔) is preserved in the temple. The body is carved with Avatamsaka Sutra.

=== Bell ===
The bell was cast by Huizong Biechuan (慧宗别传) in 1564 in the late Ming dynasty. It is 2.8-metre (9 ft 2 in) high and weighting 12.5-kilogram (28 lb). It sounds deep and sonorous when beaten. Outside of the bell cast over 60 thousand words of Āgama and other Buddhist scriptures.
