= List of Xi'an Metro stations =

The Xi'an Metro is a rapid transit system serving the city of Xi'an, the capital of Shaanxi province, with stations in seven of the city's eleven districts and 2 counties and the neighbouring city of Xianyang. It is the first city to operate a subway in Northwest China and the tenth city in mainland China to operate a subway. Xi'an began planning urban rapid rail transit in the 1980s and was approved for construction by the state on September 13, 2006. The first line, line 2, opened September 16, 2011 followed by line 1 on September 15, 2013, and line 3 on November 8, 2016. Line 4 opened on December 26, 2018. Line 14 opened on September 29, 2019.

The system consists of 13 lines spanning 423.2 km (263.0 mi) with 284 stations. (Note: Discrepancies between these figures are explained by interchange stations. Currently there are 40 interchange stations. If interchange stations are counted once for each line they serve, there would be 244 stations.) (Note: Excluding Xihu Line) The system carried a total of 746.2 million riders in 2018.

== Lines ==
Line	Terminals (District)		Opened	Newest Extension	Length km	Stations	Operators
1	Xianyangxizhan (Qindu, Xianyang)	Fangzhicheng (Baqiao)	2013	2023	42.1	30	
2	Caotan (Weiyang)	Changninggong (Chang'an)	2011	2023	33.637	25	
3	Yuhuazhai (Yanta)	Baoshuiqu (Baqiao)	2016	—	39.15	26	
4	Xi'an Beizhan (Weiyang)	Hangtian Xincheng (Chang'an)	2018	—	35.2	29	
5	Xi'andongzhan (Baqiao)	Chuangxingang (Chang'an)	2020	2026	46.4	34	
6	Xi'annanzhan (Chang'an)	Fangzhicheng (Baqiao)	2020	2024	39.6	32	
8	Loop Line		2024		49.9	37	
9	Fangzhicheng (Baqiao)	Qinlingxi (Lintong)	2020	—	25.3	15	
10	Jingshangcun (Weiyang)	Zhaohuiguangchang (Gaoling)	2024	—	34.4	17	
14	Airport West (T1, T2, T3) (Weicheng, Xianyang)	Heshao (Baqiao)	2019	2021	42.96	18	
15	Xiliu (Chang'an)	Dongzhaoyu (Chang'an)	2025		19.46	13	
16	Qinchuangyuanzhongxin (Qindu, Xianyang)	Shijingli (Chang'an)	2023		15.03	9	
Xihu	Epanggongnan (Weiyang)	Huxian (Huyi)	2022	—	26.3	2	
Total ( Excluding Xihu Line )					423.2	284	

Xi'an Metro has 13 lines in operation. Line 2 opened to the public on September 16, 2011. Line 1 began operation on September 15, 2013. Line 3 started after months of delay on November 8, 2016. Line 4 opened on December 26, 2018. Airport Intercity Railway opened on September 29, 2019. The newest line, Line 15 opened on 29 December 2025.

Xi'an began its metro system plan in the mid-1980s. The plan was first submitted to the State Council in 1994, with four planned lines and a total length of 73.2 km (45.5 mi). In February 2004, the re-drafted plan was submitted to the State Government, which received final approval on September 13, 2006.

The first line, Line 2, began construction along Chang'an Street on 29 September 2006 and was completed in 2011. It runs north–south and passes under such historic sites as the Bell Tower and city wall. It is 26.6 km (17 mi) long with 23.5 km (15 mi) lying underground, approximately 20 meters below the surface. It is estimated to have cost 17.9 billion yuan (US$2.24 billion). The route stretches from the Beikezhan to Weiqunan with 20 stops. The travel time is 39 minutes for the entire length, cutting the commute almost in half. Operations began on 28 September 2011.

Four other routes were planned to start construction in 2011 and to be finished by around 2020. When completed, the system will span 251.8 km (156.5 mi) and will mainly service the urban and suburban districts of Xi'an and part of Xianyang.

== Stations ==
=== Line 1 ===
Station name		Connections	Distance km		Location	
English	Chinese	Connections	Distance km		Location	
Xianyangxizhan	咸阳西站	XOY			Qindu	Xianyang
Baoquanlu	宝泉路				Qindu	Xianyang
Zhonghuaxilu	两寺渡				Qindu	Xianyang
Angu	安谷				Qindu	Xianyang
Chenyangzhai	陈杨寨				Qindu	Xianyang
Baimahe	白马河				Qindu	Xianyang
Shaanxi Zhongyiyao Daxue	陕西中医药大学				Qindu	Xianyang
Fenghesenlingongyuan	沣河森林公园				Qindu	Xianyang
Beihuai	北槐				Qindu	Xianyang
Shanglinlu	上林路	16			Qindu	Xianyang
Fengdongzimaoyuan	沣东自贸园				Qindu	Xianyang
Houweizhai	后卫寨		0.000	0.000	Weiyang	Xi'an
Sanqiao	三桥		2.014	2.014	Weiyang	Xi'an
Zaohe	皂河		2.073	4.087	Weiyang	Xi'an
Zaoyuan	枣园		1.044	5.131	Lianhu	Xi'an
Hancheng Lu	汉城路		1.256	6.387	Lianhu	Xi'an
Kaiyuanmen	开远门	8	1.850	8.237	Lianhu	Xi'an
Laodong Lu	劳动路		1.582	9.820	Lianhu	Xi'an
Yuxiangmen	玉祥门		1.000	10.820	Lianhu	Xi'an
Sajinqiao	洒金桥		1.214	12.034	Lianhu	Xi'an
Beidajie	北大街	2	1.224	13.258	Lianhu	Xi'an
Wulukou	五路口	4	1.444	14.702	Xincheng	Xi'an
Chaoyangmen	朝阳门		1.032	15.734	Xincheng	Xi'an
Kangfu Lu	康复路		0.915	16.649	Xincheng	Xi'an
Tonghuamen	通化门	3	0.962	17.611	Xincheng	Xi'an
Wanshoulu	万寿路	8	1.672	19.283	Xincheng	Xi'an
Changlepo	长乐坡		1.619	20.902	Xincheng	Xi'an
Chanhe	浐河		1.371	22.273	Baqiao	Xi'an
Banpo	半坡		1.107	23.381	Baqiao	Xi'an
Fangzhicheng	纺织城	6 9	1.427	24.808	Baqiao	Xi'an

=== Line 2 ===
Station name		Connections	Distance km		Location
English (Pinyin)	Chinese	Connections	Distance km		Location
Caotan	草滩				Weiyang
Honghuiyiyuan Beiqu	红会医院北区				Weiyang
Xi'an Beizhan (Note: formerly Beikezhan station (北客站), transfer gateway with line 4 and line 14 opened on 25 June 2021, renamed to Xi'an Beizhan on 20 September 2022.)	西安北站	4 14; EAY	0.000	0.000	Weiyang
Beiyuan	北苑		1.610	1.610	Weiyang
Fengcheng 10 Lu (Note: formerly Yundong Gongyuan station.)	凤城十路		1.112	2.722	Weiyang
Xingzhengzhongxin	行政中心	4	1.264	3.985	Weiyang
Fengcheng 5-lu	凤城五路		1.239	5.224	Weiyang
Qingshaonianzhongxin (Note: formerly Shitushuguan station.)	青少年中心	8	1.351	6.574	Weiyang
Daminggongxi	大明宫西		1.397	7.971	Weiyang
Longshouyuan	龙首原		1.460	9.432	Xincheng
Anyuanmen	安远门		1.191	10.623	Xincheng
Beidajie	北大街	1	1.256	11.878	Xincheng
Zhonglou	钟楼	6	0.989	12.868	Beilin
Yongningmen	永宁门		1.416	14.284	Beilin
Nanshaomen	南稍门	5	0.907	15.191	Beilin
Tiyuchang	体育场		0.869	16.060	Beilin
Xiaozhai	小寨	3	1.062	17.121	Yanta
Balicun (Note: formerly Wei 1 Jie station.)	八里村		1.137	18.258	Yanta
Dianshita (Note: formerly Huizhanzhongxin station.)	电视塔	8	1.611	19.868	Yanta
Sanyao	三爻		1.714	21.583	Yanta
Fengqiyuan	凤栖原		1.540	23.123	Chang'an
Hangtiancheng	航天城	15	1.212	24.334	Chang'an
Weiqunan	韦曲南		1.798	26.132	Chang'an
Hejiaying	何家营				Chang'an
Changninggong	常宁宫				Chang'an

=== Line 3 ===
Service routes		Station name		Connections	Distance km		Location
Service routes		English	Chinese	Connections	Distance km		Location
●	●	Yuhuazhai	鱼化寨	Xi'an SkyShuttle	0.000	0.000	Yanta
●	●	Zhangbabeilu	丈八北路		2.311	2.311	Yanta
●	●	Yanpingmen	延平门	8	1.244	3.555	Yanta
●	●	Kejilu	科技路	6	1.761	5.316	Yanta
●	●	Taibainanlu	太白南路		1.262	6.579	Yanta
●	●	Jixiangcun	吉祥村		1.618	8.197	Yanta
●	●	Xiaozhai	小寨	2	1.350	9.547	Yanta
●	●	Dayanta	大雁塔	4	1.493	11.040	Yanta
●	●	Beichitou	北池头		1.277	12.317	Yanta
●	●	Qinglongsi	青龙寺	5	1.783	14.100	Yanta
●	●	Yanxingmen (Shapo)	延兴门（沙坡）		1.869	15.968	Beilin
●	●	Xianninglu	咸宁路	6	0.799	16.767	Beilin/Xincheng
●	●	Changlegongyuan	长乐公园		1.114	17.881	Xincheng
●	●	Tonghuamen	通化门	1	0.962	18.843	Xincheng
●	●	Hujiamiao	胡家庙		0.893	19.736	Xincheng
●	●	Shijiajie	石家街		1.477	21.214	Xincheng
●	●	Xinjiamiao	辛家庙		1.557	22.771	Weiyang
●	●	Guangtaimen	广泰门	8	2.008	24.779	Weiyang
●	●	Taohuatan	桃花潭		1.828	26.607	Baqiao
●	●	Chanbazhongxin	浐灞中心		1.574	28.181	Baqiao
●	●	Xianghuwan (Huangdeng)	香湖湾（黄邓）		1.597	29.778	Baqiao
●		Wuzhuang	务庄		2.166	31.945	Baqiao
●		Guojigangwuqu	国际港务区		2.233	34.178	Baqiao
●		Shuangzhai	双寨	14	1.264	35.442	Baqiao
●		Xinzhu	新筑		1.193	36.635	Baqiao
●		Baoshuiqu	保税区		1.397	38.032	Baqiao

=== Line 4 ===
Services		Station name		Connections	Distance km		Location
Services		English	Chinese	Connections	Distance km		Location
●	●	Xi'an Beizhan (Note: formerly Beikezhan (Beiguangchang) station (北客站（北广场）), transfer gateway with line 2 opened on 25 June 2021, renamed to Xi'an Beizhan on 20 September 2022.)	西安北站	2 14; EAY	0.000	0.000	Weiyang
●	●	Yuandinglu (Note: Was Yuanshuolu station (元朔路).)	元鼎路		1.899	1.899	Weiyang
●	●	Fengcheng 12-lu	凤城十二路		0.902	2.801	Weiyang
●	●	Fengcheng 9-lu	凤城九路		1.301	4.102	Weiyang
●	●	Wenjinglu	文景路		1.184	5.285	Weiyang
●	●	Xingzhengzhongxin	行政中心	2	0.987	6.272	Weiyang
●	●	Shizhongyiyiyuan	市中医医院		1.206	7.478	Weiyang
●	●	Changqinglu	常青路		1.482	8.960	Weiyang
●	●	Baihuacun	百花村		1.028	9.988	Weiyang
●	●	Yujiazhai	余家寨	8	1.034	11.022	Weiyang
●	●	Daminggongbei	大明宫北		1.005	12.027	Weiyang
●	●	Daminggong	大明宫		1.263	13.290	Weiyang
●	●	Hanyuandian	含元殿		1.007	14.296	Xincheng
●	●	Xi'anzhan	西安站	XAY	1.229	15.526	Xincheng
●	●	Wulukou	五路口	1	1.062	16.588	Xincheng
●	●	Dachaishi	大差市	6	1.099	17.686	Beilin
●	●	Hepingmen	和平门		1.071	18.758	Beilin
●	●	Jianzhukejidaxue · Lijiacun	建筑科技大学·李家村	5	0.951	19.709	Beilin
●	●	Xi'ankejidaxue	西安科技大学		0.870	20.578	Beilin
●	●	Dayanta	大雁塔	3	1.109	21.687	Yanta
●	●	Datangfurongyuan	大唐芙蓉园		1.820	23.507	Yanta
●	●	Qujiangchixi	曲江池西	8	1.495	25.002	Yanta
●	●	Jinhutuo	金滹沱		1.869	26.871	Yanta
●	●	Hangtiandadao	航天大道		1.099	27.970	Chang'an
●	●	Feitianlu	飞天路		0.913	28.883	Chang'an
●	●	Dongchang'anjie	东长安街	15	0.932	29.815	Chang'an
●	●	Shenzhoudadao	神舟大道		1.874	31.689	Chang'an
●	●	Hangtiandonglu	航天东路		1.169	32.858	Chang'an
●		Hangtianxincheng	航天新城		1.520	34.378	Chang'an

=== Line 5 ===
Services		Station name		Connections	Location	
Services		English	Chinese	Connections	Location	
●		Chuangxingang	创新港		Chang'an	Xi'an
●		Chuangxingangdong	创新港东		Qindu	Xianyang
●		Aoxiangxiaozhen	翱翔小镇		Qindu	Xianyang
●		Diaotai	钓台		Qindu	Xianyang
●		Fengxiwenhuagongyuan	沣西文化公园		Chang'an	Xi'an
●		Dongmafang	东马坊		Chang'an	Xi'an
●		Gaoqiao	高桥		Chang'an	Xi'an
●		Wenjiaoyuan	文教园		Chang'an	Xi'an
●		Huanlegu	欢乐谷	16	Chang'an	Xi'an
●		Haojing	镐京		Chang'an	Xi'an
●		Fuxingdadaonan	复兴大道南		Chang'an	Xi'an
●		Doumen	斗门		Chang'an	Xi'an
●		Wangsi	王寺		Chang'an	Xi'an
●	●	Epanggongnan	阿房宫南	Xihu	Weiyang	Xi'an
●	●	Shiqiaolijiao	石桥立交		Weiyang	Xi'an
●	●	Xiyaotou	西窑头		Yanta	Xi'an
●	●	Hanchengnanlu	汉城南路		Yanta	Xi'an
●	●	Jinguangmen	金光门	8	Yanta	Xi'an
●	●	Fengqinggongyuan	丰庆公园		Lianhu	Xi'an
●	●	Xibeigongyedaxue	西北工业大学	6	Beilin	Xi'an
●	●	Bianjiacun	边家村		Beilin	Xi'an
●	●	Shengrenminyiyuan · Huangyancun	省人民医院·黄雁村		Beilin	Xi'an
●	●	Nanshaomen	南稍门	2	Beilin	Xi'an
●	●	Wenyilu	文艺路		Beilin	Xi'an
●	●	Jianzhukejidaxue · Lijiacun	建筑科技大学·李家村	4	Beilin	Xi'an
●	●	Taiyilu	太乙路		Beilin	Xi'an
●	●	Yanxianglubeikou	雁翔路北口		Yanta	Xi'an
●	●	Qinglongsi	青龙寺	3	Yanta	Xi'an
●	●	Ligongdaqujiangxiaoqu	理工大曲江校区		Yanta	Xi'an
●	●	Huangqutou	黄渠头		Yanta	Xi'an
●	●	Matengkong	马腾空	8	Yanta	Xi'an
●	●	Yuedengge	月登阁		Yanta	Xi'an
●	●	Yanminghu	雁鸣湖		Baqiao	Xi'an
●	●	Xi'andongzhan	西安东站	Xi'an East (U/C)	Baqiao	Xi'an

=== Line 6 ===
The Xi'annanzhan - Xibeigongyedaxue service only operates in morning peak time.

Service route		Station name		Connections	Location
Service route		English	Chinese	Connections	Location
●	●	Xi'annanzhan	西安南站	Xi'an South (U/C)	Chang'an
●	●	Xidiankedananxiaoqu · Weilaizhitong	西电科大南校区·未来之瞳		Chang'an
●	●	Xi'anguojiyixuezhongxin	西安国际医学中心		Chang'an
●	●	Rencun	仁村		Chang'an
●	●	Guoduxi	郭杜西	15	Chang'an
●	●	Xibudadao (Xitailukou)	西部大道（西太路口）		Chang'an
●	●	Zaozitai	造字台		Chang'an
●	●	Zhangba 6-lu	丈八六路		Yanta
●	●	Zhangba 4-lu	丈八四路	Xi'an SkyShuttle	Yanta
●	●	Zhangba 1-lu	丈八一路		Yanta
●	●	Shengtiyuguan	省体育馆	8	Yanta
●	●	Mutasi	木塔寺		Yanta
●	●	Ganjiazhai	甘家寨		Yanta
●	●	Kejilu	科技路	3	Yanta
●	●	Xibeigongyedaxue	西北工业大学	5	Beilin / Lianhu
●		Datangxishi	大唐西市		Lianhu
●		Andingmen	安定门		Lianhu
●		Qiaozikou	桥梓口		Lianhu
●		Guangjijie	广济街		Beilin / Lianhu
●		Zhonglou	钟楼	2	Beilin / Lianhu / Xincheng
●		Dachaishi	大差市	4	Beilin / Xincheng
●		Changlemen	长乐门		Beilin
●		Jiaotongdaxue · Xingqinggong	交通大学·兴庆宫		Beilin
●		Xianninglu	咸宁路	3	Beilin / Xincheng
●		Gongyuannanlu	公园南路		Beilin / Xincheng
●		Wanshounanlu	万寿南路	8	Xincheng
●		Weixingcekongzhongxin	卫星测控中心		Xincheng
●		Tianjiawan	田家湾		Baqiao
●		Mujiangwang	穆将王		Baqiao
●		Fang 6-lu	纺六路		Baqiao
●		Fang 2-lu	纺二路		Baqiao
●		Fangzhicheng	纺织城	1 9	Baqiao

=== Line 8 ===
Station name		Connections	Distance km	Location
English	Chinese	Connections	Distance km	Location
— ↑ Loop line - towards Shengtiyuguan ↑ —				
Shanmenkou	山门口			Yanta
Anhuamen	安化门			Yanta
Dongyilu	东仪路			Yanta
Dianshita	电视塔	2		Yanta
Datangbuyecheng	大唐不夜城			Yanta
Qujiangchixi	曲江池西	4		Yanta
Hanyao	寒窑			Yanta
Xinkaimen	新开门			Yanta
Miaojiazhai	缪家寨			Yanta
Zhiwuyuan	植物园			Yanta
Matengkong	马腾空	5		Yanta
Dongdengjiapo	东等驾坡			Yanta
Xidengjiapo	西等驾坡			Yanta
Wanshounanlu	万寿南路	6		Xincheng
Hansenzhai	韩森寨			Xincheng
Wanshoulu	万寿路	1		Xincheng
Xingfulindaibei	幸福林带北			Xincheng
Mijiaya	米家崖			Baqiao
Guangtaimen	广泰门	3		Weiyang
Beichendonglu	北辰东路			Weiyang
Jingshangcun	井上村	10		Weiyang
Yujiazhai	余家寨	4		Weiyang
Shidi-sanyiyuan	市第三医院			Weiyang
Qingshaonianzhongxin (Note: formerly Shitushuguan station.)	青少年中心	2		Weiyang
Bachengmen	霸城门			Weiyang
Dafengge	大风阁			Weiyang
Hongmiaopo	红庙坡			Lianhu
Jingyaomen	景曜门			Lianhu
Guanghuamen	光化门			Lianhu
Baijiakou	白家口			Lianhu
Kaiyuanmen	开远门	1		Lianhu
Tumen	土门			Lianhu
Jinguangmen	金光门	5		Lianhu
Yanpingmen	延平门	3		Yanta
Keji 2 Lu	科技二路			Yanta
Mutasixi (Note: Change to Mutasi (木塔寺) when Line 12 opens. Mutasi will be a transfer station of three lines.)	木塔寺西	6 (Note: Transfer available after Line 12 opens.) 12		Yanta
Shengtiyuguan	省体育馆	6		Yanta
— ↓ Loop line - towards Shanmenkou ↓ —				

=== Line 9 ===
Station name		Connections
English	Chinese	Connections
Fangzhicheng	纺织城	1 6
Xiangwang	香王	
Baliu 2 Lu	灞柳二路	
Tianwang	田王	
Hongqing	洪庆	
Zixia 3 Lu	紫霞三路	
Fenghuangchi	凤凰池	
Yingwusigongyuan	鹦鹉寺公园	
Zhiyangguangchang	芷阳广场	
Xigongchengda · Xikeda (Lintongxiaoqu)	西工程大·西科大（临潼校区）	
Xihuayuan	西花园	
Huaqingchi	华清池	
Dongsancha	东三岔	
Yinqiaodadao	银桥大道	
Qinlingxi	秦陵西	

=== Line 10 ===
Station name		Connections	Location
English	Chinese	Connections	Location
Jingshangcun	井上村	8	Weiyang
Mao'erzhong	帽珥冢		Weiyang
Tuanjiecun	团结村		Weiyang
Hongqichang	红旗厂		Weiyang
Xi'angongda · Wudelu	西安工大·武德路	14	Weiyang
Jingjiabu	景家堡		Weiyang
Weiyanghu	未央湖		Weiyang
Xibu	西堡		Baqiao
Shuiliu	水流		Baqiao
Jingweibandao	泾渭半岛		Gaoling
Yangguanzhai	杨官寨		Gaoling
Junzhuang	军庄		Gaoling
Chonghuang	崇皇		Gaoling
Yuchu	榆楚		Gaoling
Luyuandadao	鹿苑大道		Gaoling
Xingwang	杏王		Gaoling
Zhaohuiguangchang	昭慧广场		Gaoling

=== Line 14 (Formerly Airport Intercity Line (West Section) before 29 June 2021) ===
Station name		Connections	Location	
English	Chinese	Connections	Location	
Airport West (T1, T2, T3)	机场西（T1、T2、T3）	XIY	Weicheng	Xianyang
Airport (T5)	机场（T5）	XIY	Weicheng	Xianyang
Konggangxincheng	空港新城		Weicheng	Xianyang
Yishuzhongxin	艺术中心		Weicheng	Xianyang
Baiqizhai	摆旗寨		Weicheng	Xianyang
Changling	长陵		Weicheng	Xianyang
Qinhanxincheng	秦汉新城		Weicheng	Xianyang
Qingong	秦宫		Weicheng	Xianyang
Weihenan	渭河南		Weiyang	Xi'an
Xi'an Beizhan (Note: formerly Beikezhan (Beiguangchang) station (北客站（北广场）), transfer gateway with line 2 opened on 25 June 2021, renamed to Xi'an Beizhan on 20 September 2022.)	西安北站	2 4 EAY	Weiyang	Xi'an
Wenjingshangongyuan	文景山公园		Weiyang	Xi'an
Xi'angongda · Wudelu	西安工大·武德路	10	Weiyang	Xi'an
Beichen	北辰		Weiyang	Xi'an
Aotizhongxin	奥体中心		Baqiao	Xi'an
Shuangzhai	双寨	3	Baqiao	Xi'an
Xinsi	新寺		Baqiao	Xi'an
Gangwudadao	港务大道		Baqiao	Xi'an
Heshao	贺韶		Baqiao	Xi'an

=== Line 15 ===
All stations are located in Chang'an District.

Station name		Connections
English	Chinese	Connections
Xiliu	细柳	
Fujunmiao	府君庙	
Zhucunxi	祝村西	
Zhucun	祝村	Xi'an SkyShuttle
Guoduxi	郭杜西	6
Guodu	郭杜	
Yinghua Guangchang	樱花广场	
Youdian Daxue	邮电大学	
Chang'an Guangchang	长安广场	
Hangtiancheng	航天城	2
Huangzipo	皇子坡	
Dongchang'anjie	东长安街	4
Dongzhaoyu	东兆余	

=== Line 16 ===
Station name		Connections
English	Chinese	Connections
Qinchuangyuanzhongxin	秦创原中心	
Xixiandasha	西咸大厦	
Shanglinlu	上林路	1
Fuxingdadaobei	复兴大道北	
Xi'anguojizuqiuzhongxin	西安国际足球中心	
Xiliuying	细柳营	
Fengdongchengshiguangchang	沣东城市广场	
Huanlegu	欢乐谷	5
Shijingli	诗经里	

=== Xihu Line ===
Station Name		Connections	Distance km	Location
English	Chinese	Connections	Distance km	Location
Epanggongnan	阿房宫南	5		Weiyang
Kunmingchi (U/C)	昆明池			Chang'an
Mawang (reserved)	马王			Chang'an
Wuzhu (reserved)	五竹			Huyi
Huxian	户县			Huyi
