= Line 5 (Xi'an Metro) =

Metro line in Xi'an, China

- 5
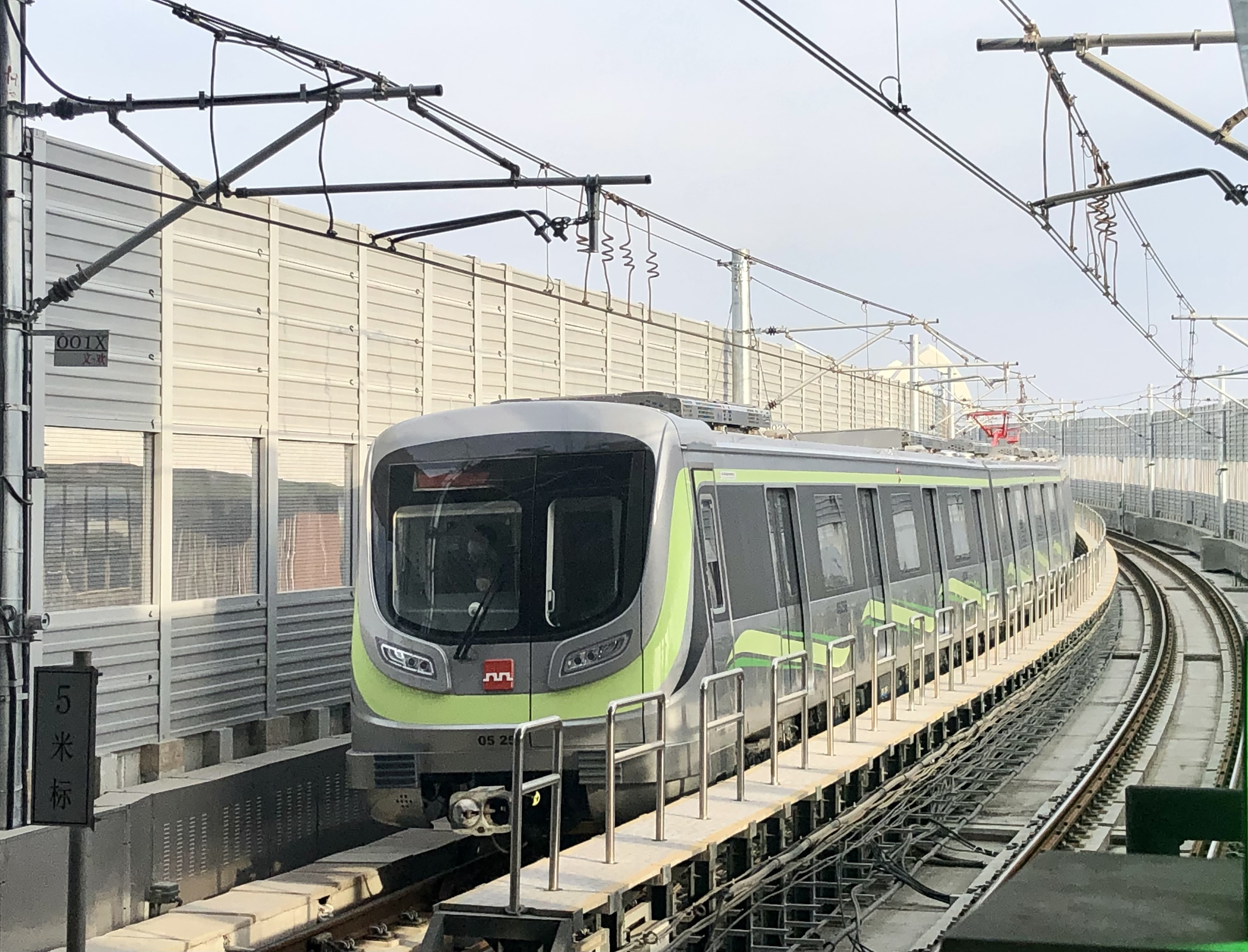
- Line 5 train approaching Wenjiaoyuan station

Overview
- Status: Operational
- Owner: Xi'an
- Locale: Xi'an; Shaanxi
- Termini: Chuangxingang; Xi'andongzhan
- Stations: 34

Service
- Type: Rapid transit
- System: Xi'an Metro
- Services: 1
- Operator: Xi'an Metro Corporation

History
- Opened: 28 December 2020; 5 years ago

Technical
- Line length: 46.4 km (28.8 mi) (in operation)
- Number of tracks: 2
- Character: Underground
- Track gauge: 1,435 mm (4 ft 8 1/2 in)

Line 5 is a line of the Xi'an Metro. The line runs from east to west, and starts at Chuangxingang and ends at Xi'andongzhan. The line is colored yellow-green on maps.

== History ==
=== Opening timeline ===
Segment	Commencement	Length	Station(s)	Name
Chuangxingang — Matengkong	28 December 2020	41.6 km (25.85 mi)	31	Phase 1 & 2
Matengkong — Yanminghu	26 September 2024	3.4 km (2.11 mi)	2	Phase 1 east section
Yanminghu — Xi'andongzhan	30 June 2026	1.4 km (0.87 mi)	1	

While Phase 1 includes section from Epanggongnan to Xi'andongzhan, and Phase 2 includes Chuangxingang to Epanggongnan, both phase sections (except the three easternmost stations) are opened together on 28 December 2020. The metro station at Xi'andongzhan is under construction. It will open at the same time as Xi'an East Railway Station.

== Stations ==
Services		Station name		Connections	Location	
Services		English	Chinese	Connections	Location	
●		Chuangxingang	创新港		Chang'an	Xi'an
●		Chuangxingangdong	创新港东		Qindu	Xianyang
●		Aoxiangxiaozhen	翱翔小镇		Qindu	Xianyang
●		Diaotai	钓台		Qindu	Xianyang
●		Fengxiwenhuagongyuan	沣西文化公园		Chang'an	Xi'an
●		Dongmafang	东马坊		Chang'an	Xi'an
●		Gaoqiao	高桥		Chang'an	Xi'an
●		Wenjiaoyuan	文教园		Chang'an	Xi'an
●		Huanlegu	欢乐谷	16	Chang'an	Xi'an
●		Haojing	镐京		Chang'an	Xi'an
●		Fuxingdadaonan	复兴大道南		Chang'an	Xi'an
●		Doumen	斗门		Chang'an	Xi'an
●		Wangsi	王寺		Chang'an	Xi'an
●	●	Epanggongnan	阿房宫南	Xihu	Weiyang	Xi'an
●	●	Shiqiaolijiao	石桥立交		Weiyang	Xi'an
●	●	Xiyaotou	西窑头		Yanta	Xi'an
●	●	Hanchengnanlu	汉城南路		Yanta	Xi'an
●	●	Jinguangmen	金光门	8	Yanta	Xi'an
●	●	Fengqinggongyuan	丰庆公园		Lianhu	Xi'an
●	●	Xibeigongyedaxue	西北工业大学	6	Beilin	Xi'an
●	●	Bianjiacun	边家村		Beilin	Xi'an
●	●	Shengrenminyiyuan · Huangyancun	省人民医院·黄雁村		Beilin	Xi'an
●	●	Nanshaomen	南稍门	2	Beilin	Xi'an
●	●	Wenyilu	文艺路		Beilin	Xi'an
●	●	Jianzhukejidaxue · Lijiacun	建筑科技大学·李家村	4	Beilin	Xi'an
●	●	Taiyilu	太乙路		Beilin	Xi'an
●	●	Yanxianglubeikou	雁翔路北口		Yanta	Xi'an
●	●	Qinglongsi	青龙寺	3	Yanta	Xi'an
●	●	Ligongdaqujiangxiaoqu	理工大曲江校区		Yanta	Xi'an
●	●	Huangqutou	黄渠头		Yanta	Xi'an
●	●	Matengkong	马腾空	8	Yanta	Xi'an
●	●	Yuedengge	月登阁		Yanta	Xi'an
●	●	Yanminghu	雁鸣湖		Baqiao	Xi'an
●	●	Xi'andongzhan	西安东站	Xi'an East (U/C)	Baqiao	Xi'an
