= Line 8 (Xi'an Metro) =

Metro line in Xi'an, China

- 8
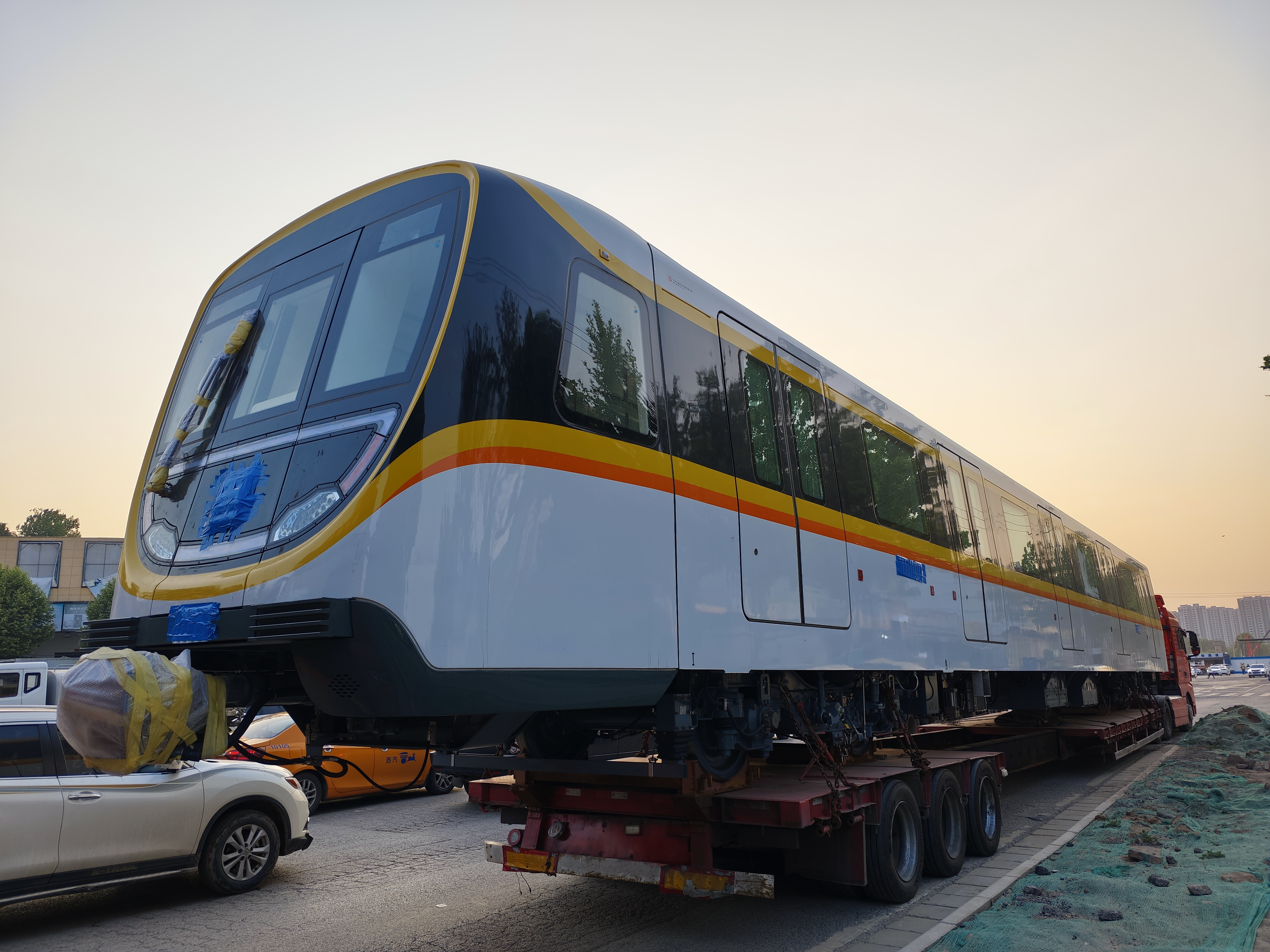
- A Line 8 train

Overview
- Native name: 西安地铁8号（环）线
- Status: Trial operation
- Owner: Xi'an
- Locale: Xi'an
- Termini: Loop line
- Stations: 37

Service
- Type: Rapid transit
- System: Xi'an Metro
- Services: 1
- Operator(s): Xi'an Metro Ltd
- Depot(s): Yanminghu

History
- Opened: 26 December 2024; 17 months ago

Technical
- Line length: 49.9 km (31.0 mi)
- Number of tracks: 2
- Character: Underground
- Track gauge: 1,435 mm (4 ft 8 1/2 in)

Line 8 of Xi'an Metro (Chinese: 西安地铁八号（环）线; pinyin: Xī'ān Dìtiě Bāhào (Huán) Xiàn) is a loop line in Xi'an, Shaanxi Province, China. It opened on 26 December 2024. The line is 49.9 km (31.0 mi) in length with 37 stations. The line is colored yellow on system maps.

== History ==
The construction of Line 8 started on 30 October 2019, and was finished in late June 2024 After various trial operations without passengers, a trial ride was open to the public on 22 December 2024, and formal operations started on 26 December 2024.

== Stations ==
Station name		Connections	Distance km	Location
English	Chinese	Connections	Distance km	Location
— ↑ Loop line - towards Shengtiyuguan ↑ —				
Shanmenkou	山门口			Yanta
Anhuamen	安化门			Yanta
Dongyilu	东仪路			Yanta
Dianshita	电视塔	2		Yanta
Datangbuyecheng	大唐不夜城			Yanta
Qujiangchixi	曲江池西	4		Yanta
Hanyao	寒窑			Yanta
Xinkaimen	新开门			Yanta
Miaojiazhai	缪家寨			Yanta
Zhiwuyuan	植物园			Yanta
Matengkong	马腾空	5		Yanta
Dongdengjiapo	东等驾坡			Yanta
Xidengjiapo	西等驾坡			Yanta
Wanshounanlu	万寿南路	6		Xincheng
Hansenzhai	韩森寨			Xincheng
Wanshoulu	万寿路	1		Xincheng
Xingfulindaibei	幸福林带北			Xincheng
Mijiaya	米家崖			Baqiao
Guangtaimen	广泰门	3		Weiyang
Beichendonglu	北辰东路			Weiyang
Jingshangcun	井上村	10		Weiyang
Yujiazhai	余家寨	4		Weiyang
Shidi-sanyiyuan	市第三医院			Weiyang
Qingshaonianzhongxin (Note: formerly Shitushuguan station.)	青少年中心	2		Weiyang
Bachengmen	霸城门			Weiyang
Dafengge	大风阁			Weiyang
Hongmiaopo	红庙坡			Lianhu
Jingyaomen	景曜门			Lianhu
Guanghuamen	光化门			Lianhu
Baijiakou	白家口			Lianhu
Kaiyuanmen	开远门	1		Lianhu
Tumen	土门			Lianhu
Jinguangmen	金光门	5		Lianhu
Yanpingmen	延平门	3		Yanta
Keji 2 Lu	科技二路			Yanta
Mutasixi (Note: Change to Mutasi (木塔寺) when Line 12 opens. Mutasi will be a transfer station of three lines.)	木塔寺西	6 (Note: Transfer available after Line 12 opens.) 12		Yanta
Shengtiyuguan	省体育馆	6		Yanta
— ↓ Loop line - towards Shanmenkou ↓ —				
