= Xi'an–Huyi railway =

Railway line in Xi'an operated by Xi'an Rail Transit Group

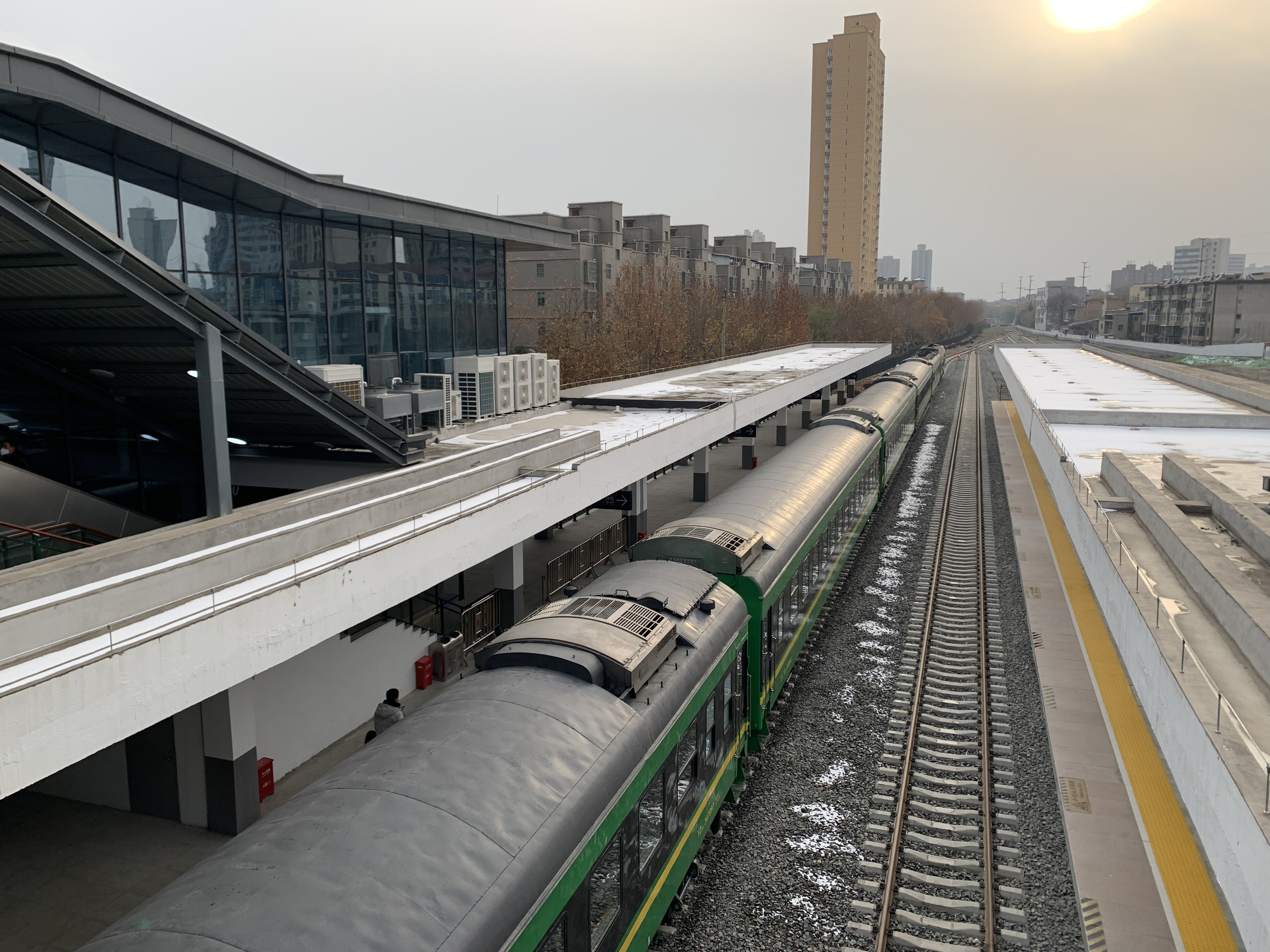
- Huxian station (户县站) in Huyi District, Xi'an

Overview
- Status: Operational
- Locale: Xi'an, Shaanxi Province, China
- Termini: Epanggongnan; Huxian

Service
- Operator(s): China Railway Xi'an Group / Xi'an Rail Transit Group (since November 2022)

Technical
- Line length: 41.3 km (25.7 mi)
- Track gauge: Standard Gauge
- Minimum radius: 300 m

Xi'an–Huyi railway (西户铁路), also known as Xi'an–Yuxia railway (西余铁路) is a railway branch line of the Longhai railway. It runs from Sanmincun railway station in Lianhu District in central Xi'an to Yuxia railway station in Huyi District in southwestern Xi'an. The line was about 41 km (25 mi) long and was used for freight traffic.

== Commuter rail service ==
Commuter rail service operated by Xi'an Rail Transit Group started on 1 November 2022. On the network maps it is marked as Xian Metro Xihu Line.

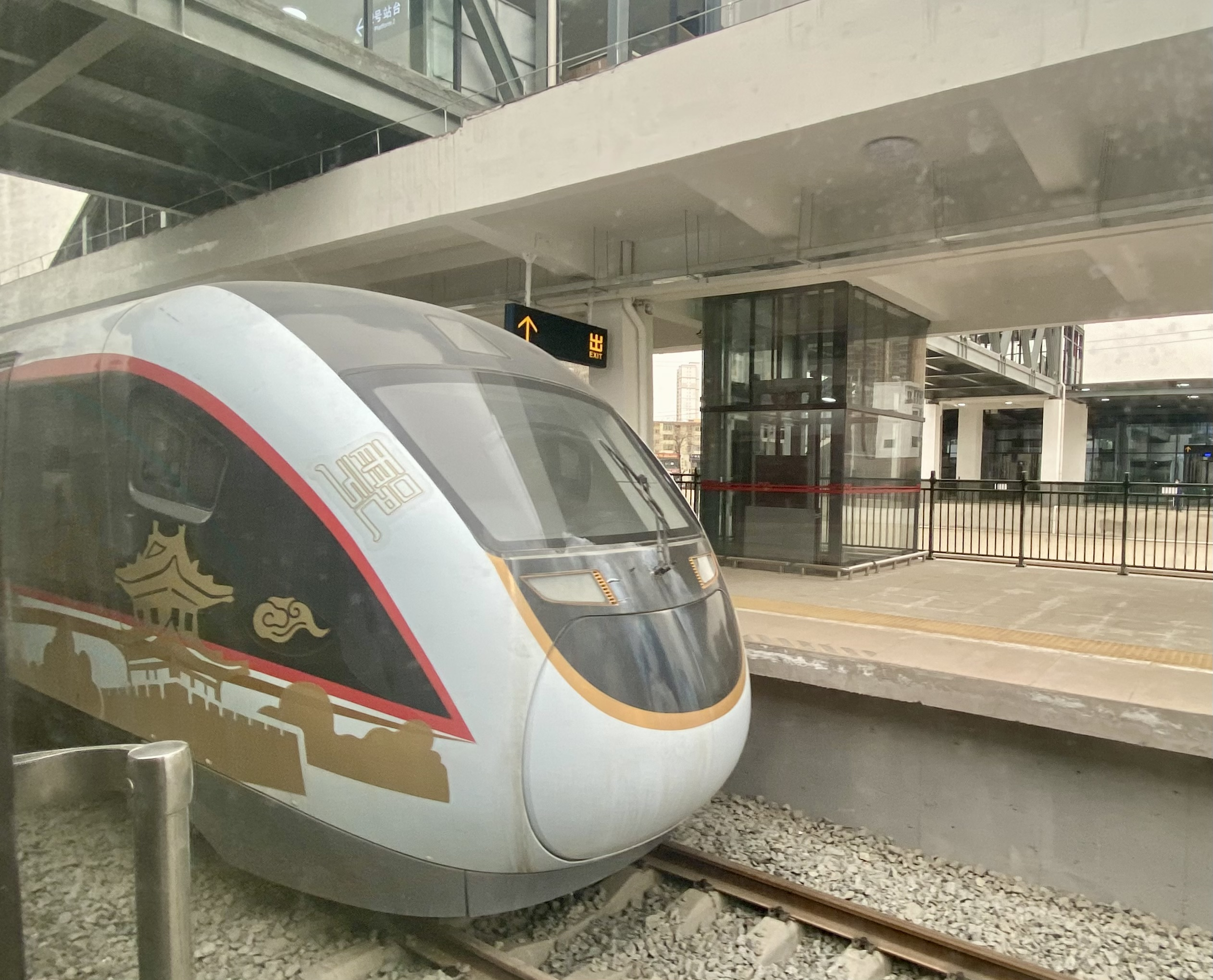
Commuter train at Huxian railway station

Station Name		Connections	Distance km	Location
English	Chinese	Connections	Distance km	Location
Epanggongnan	阿房宫南	5		Weiyang
Kunmingchi (U/C)	昆明池			Chang'an
Mawang (reserved)	马王			Chang'an
Wuzhu (reserved)	五竹			Huyi
Huxian	户县			Huyi

== History ==
The Xi'an–Huyi railway was surveyed and designed by the Southwest Railway Design Bureau in 1954 and constructed by the Sixth Railway Engineering Bureau on May 1, 1955. The line officially opened to traffic on February 20, 1956. Due to low passenger volume, the Xi'an–Huyi railway stopped operating passenger services in 2000. Construction of the renovation project started on July 21, 2022.
