= Lintong, Xi'an =

Lintong 临潼区 Lintung
- District
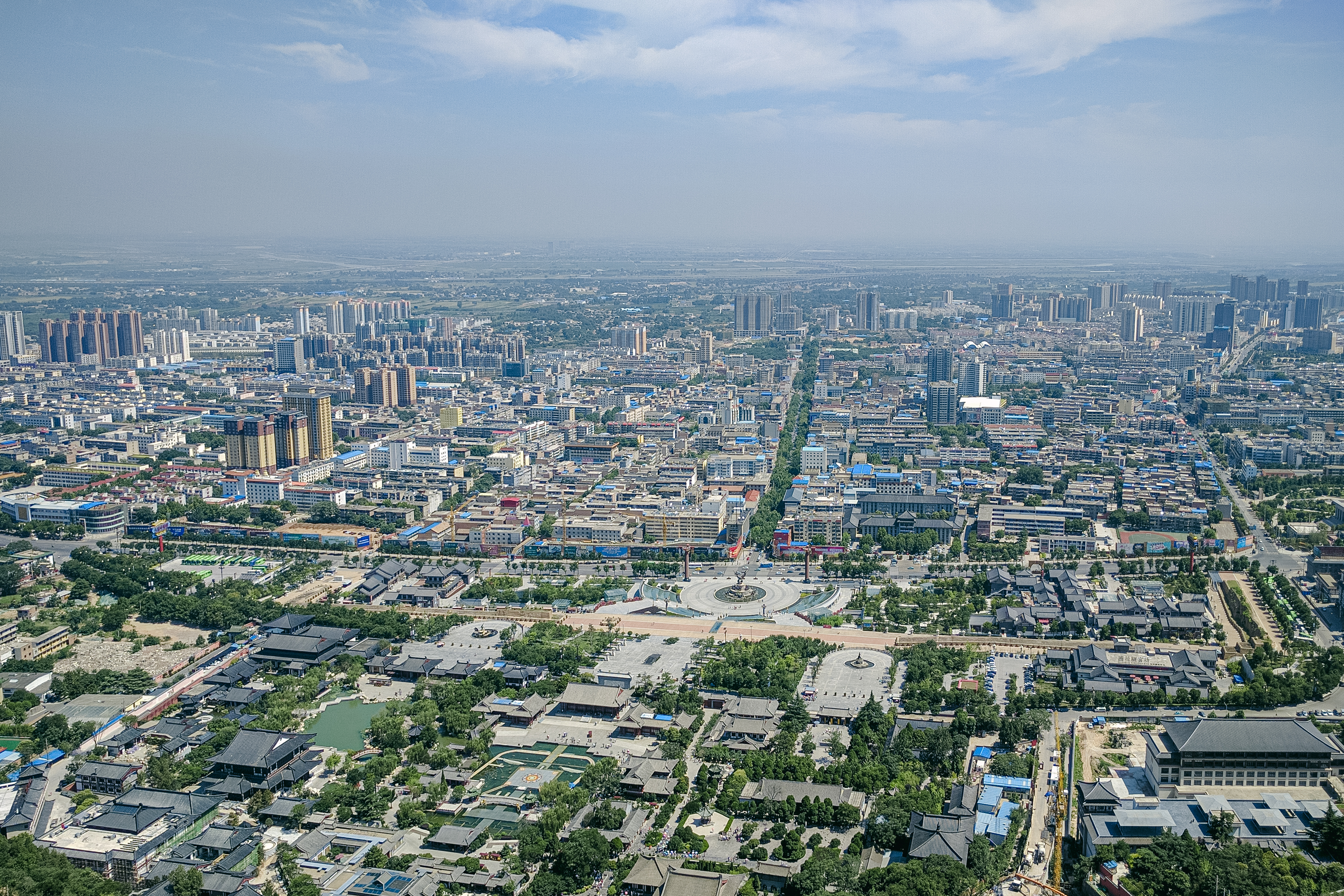
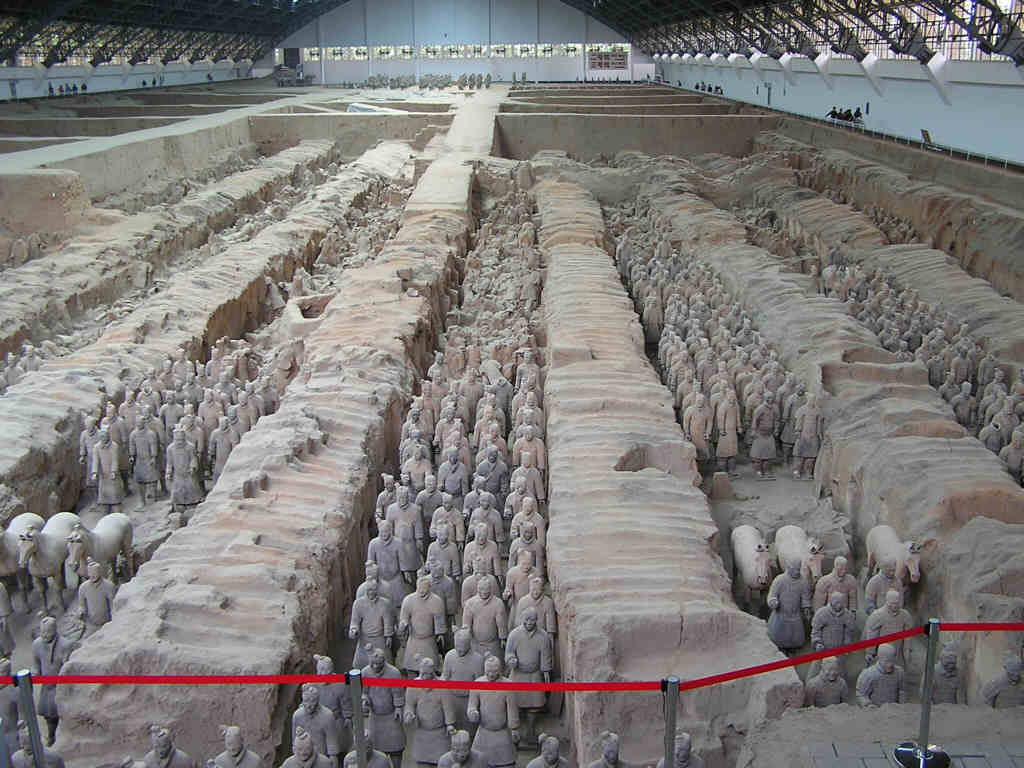
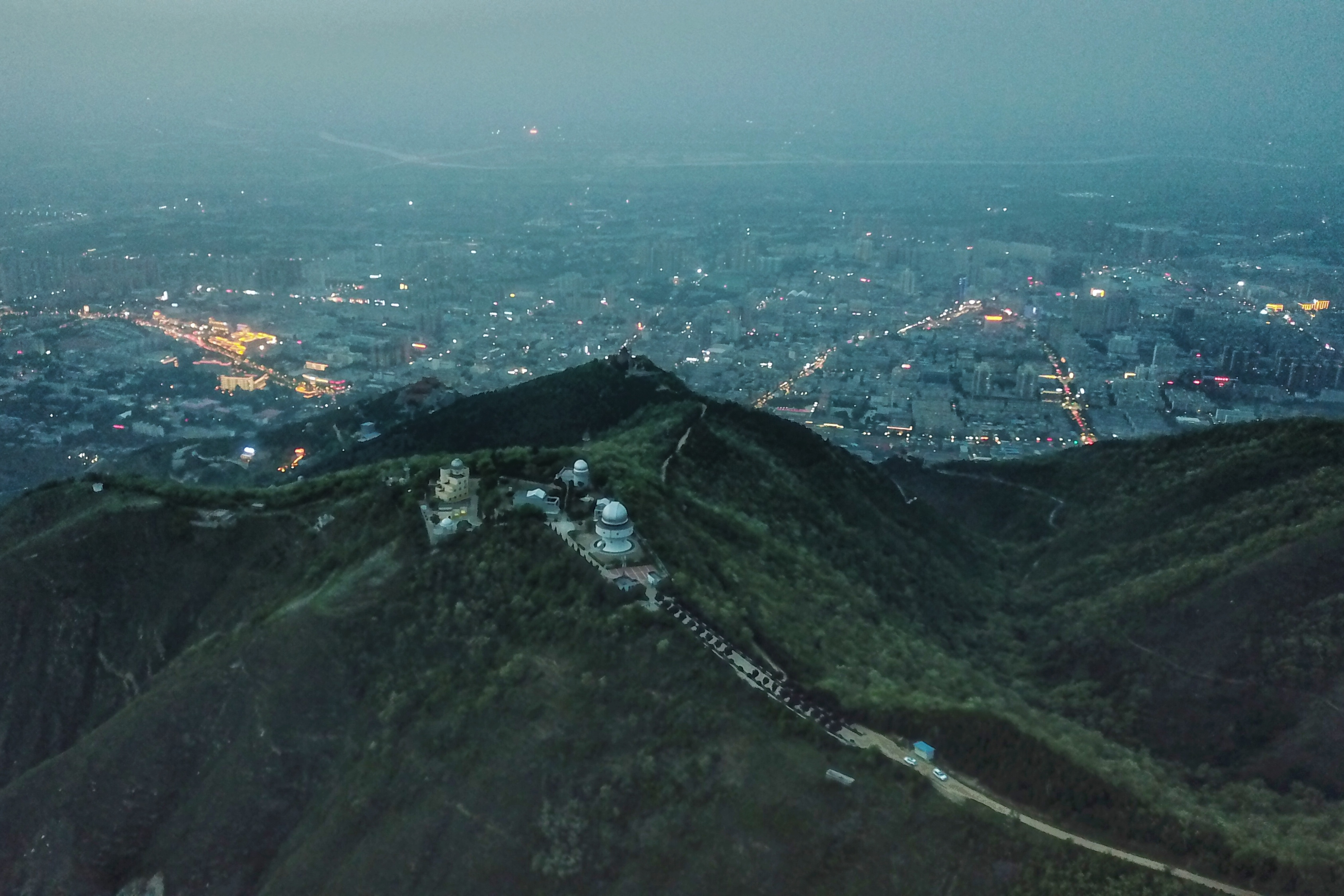
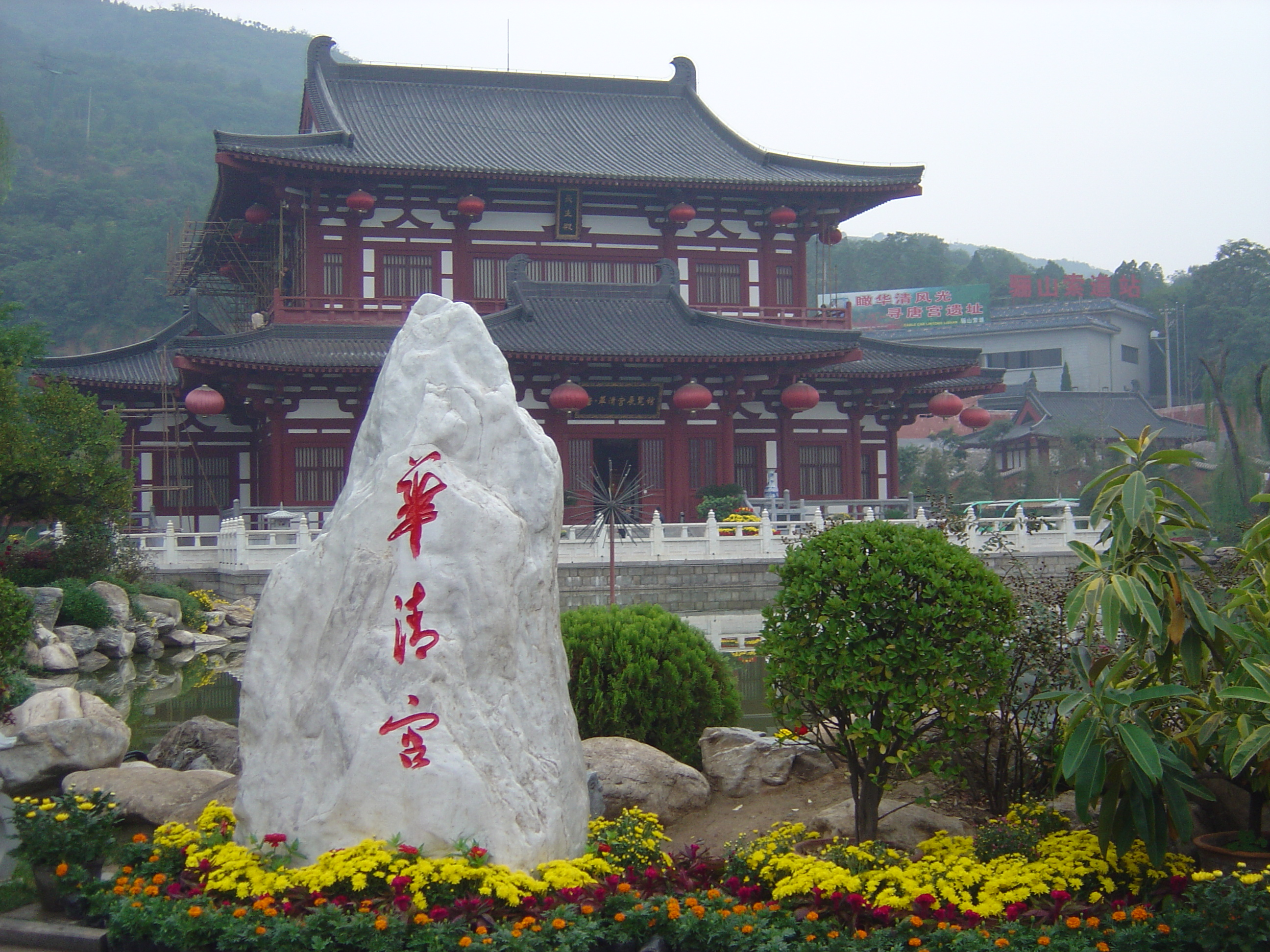
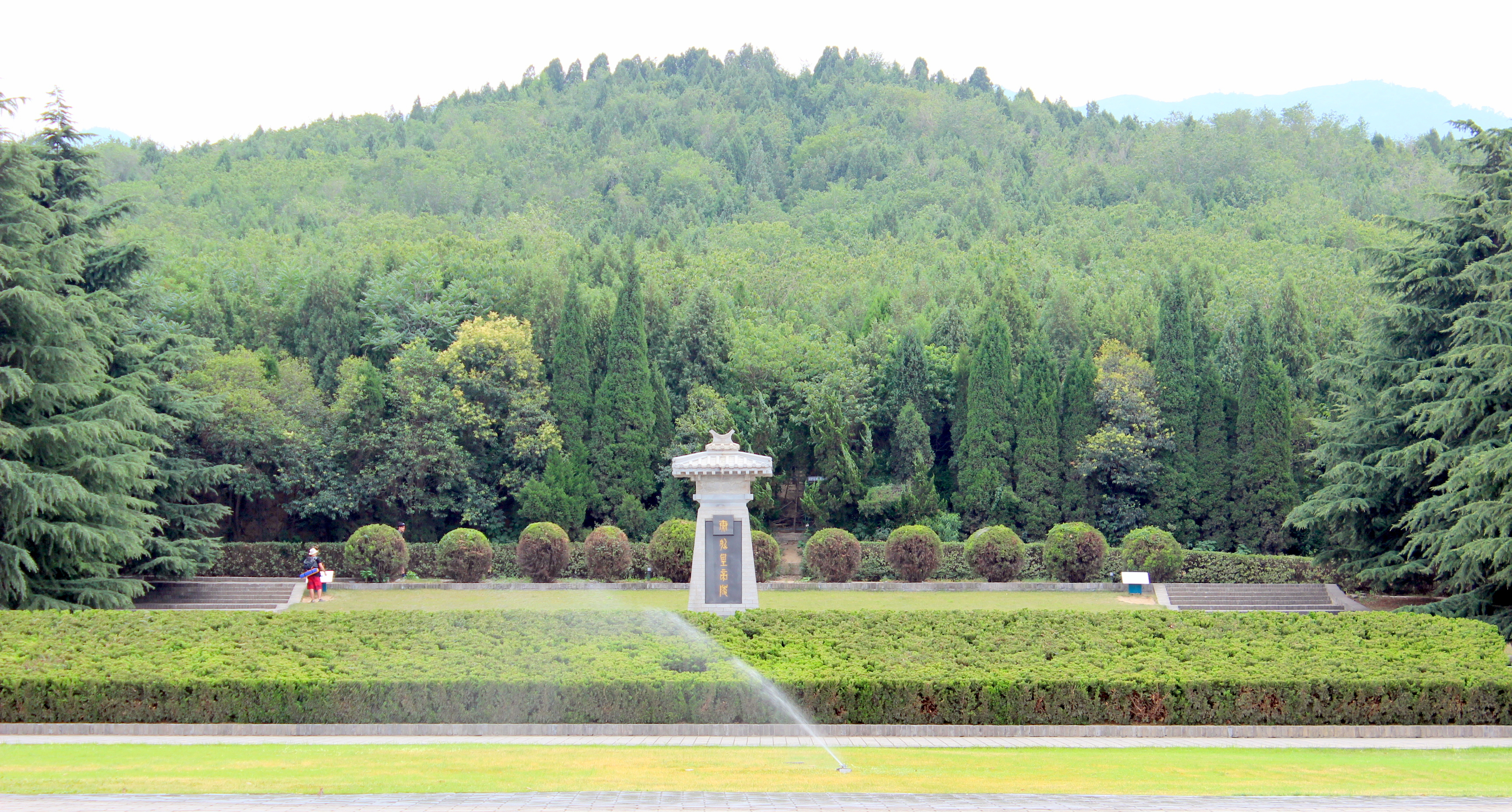
- Aerial view of the Lintong District Terracotta Army National Time Service Center Huaqing Palace Mausoleum of Qin Shi Huang
- Interactive map of Lintong
- Coordinates: 34°22′31″N 109°13′04″E
- Country: People's Republic of China
- Province: Shaanxi
- Sub-provincial city: Xi'an

Area
  - Total: 915.97 km^{2} (353.66 sq mi)

Population (2020)
  - Total: 675,961
  - Density: 716.04/km^{2} (1,854.5/sq mi)
- Time zone: UTC+8 (China Standard)
- Postal code: 7106XX
- Website: lintong.gov.cn

Lintong District (Chinese: 临潼区; pinyin: Líntóng Qū), formerly Lintong County, is one of 11 urban districts of the prefecture-level city of Xi'an, the capital of Shaanxi Province, Northwest China. The district was approved to establish from the former Lintong County (临潼县) by the Chinese State Council on June 25, 1997. The Terracotta Army and the Mausoleum of the First Qin Emperor was discovered in March 1974 near this district. The district borders the prefecture-level cities of Xianyang to the northwest and Weinan to the east, Gaoling County to the northeast, Baqiao District to the southeast, Lianhu and Xincheng Districts to the south, and Chang'an District to the southwest.

Artifacts from the tomb of Qin Shi Huang, China's first emperor, can be viewed at the Emperor Qinshihuang's Mausoleum Site Museum (秦始皇帝陵博物院) in Lintong District.

The National Time Service Center, the Chinese Academy of Sciences (中国科学院国家授时中心), formerly known as Shaanxi Astronomical Observatory (陕西天文台), was established in 1966 in Lintong responsible for the time standard in mainland China. It was renamed to its present name in 2001.

The name of the district comes from two rivers. Lin river is on the east side and Tong river is on the west side of the district.

Lintong is headquarters of the 47th Group Army of the People's Liberation Army, one of the two group armies that comprise the Lanzhou Military Region responsible for defending China's northwest borders.

== Administrative divisions ==
As of 2020, Lintong District is divided to 23 subdistricts.

Subdistricts

- Lishan Subdistrict (骊山街道)
- Qinling Subdistrict (秦陵街道)
- Xinfeng Subdistrict (新丰街道)
- Daiwang Subdistrict (代王街道)
- Xiekou Subdistrict (斜口街道)
- Xingzhe Subdistrict (行者街道)
- Lingkou Subdistrict (零口街道)
- Xiangqiao Subdistrict (相桥街道)
- Yujin Subdistrict (雨金街道)
- Xinshi Subdistrict (新市街道)
- Xuyang Subdistrict (徐杨街道)
- Xiquan Subdistrict (西泉街道)
- Liyang Subdistrict (栎阳街道)
- Ma'e Subdistrict (马额街道)
- Hezhai Subdistrict (何寨街道)
- Jiaokou Subdistrict (交口街道)
- Youhuai Subdistrict (油槐街道)
- Beitian Subdistrict (北田街道)
- Tielu Subdistrict (铁炉街道)
- Renliu Subdistrict (任留街道)
- Muzhai Subdistrict (穆寨街道)
- Xiaojin Subdistrict (小金街道)
- Renzong Subdistrict (仁宗街道)

== Climate ==
Climate data for Lintong District, elevation 425 m (1,394 ft), (1991–2020 normals, extremes 1991–present)
Month	Jan	Feb	Mar	Apr	May	Jun	Jul	Aug	Sep	Oct	Nov	Dec	Year
Record high °C (°F)	16.7 (62.1)	23.6 (74.5)	30.2 (86.4)	35.2 (95.4)	39.1 (102.4)	42.2 (108.0)	41.7 (107.1)	40.4 (104.7)	38.0 (100.4)	33.2 (91.8)	26.3 (79.3)	20.0 (68.0)	42.2 (108.0)
Mean daily maximum °C (°F)	5.1 (41.2)	9.6 (49.3)	15.9 (60.6)	22.4 (72.3)	27.3 (81.1)	32.0 (89.6)	32.9 (91.2)	30.7 (87.3)	25.6 (78.1)	19.6 (67.3)	12.7 (54.9)	6.6 (43.9)	20.0 (68.1)
Daily mean °C (°F)	0.0 (32.0)	3.9 (39.0)	9.7 (49.5)	15.8 (60.4)	20.7 (69.3)	25.6 (78.1)	27.2 (81.0)	25.2 (77.4)	20.1 (68.2)	14.1 (57.4)	7.3 (45.1)	1.5 (34.7)	14.3 (57.7)
Mean daily minimum °C (°F)	−4.1 (24.6)	−0.7 (30.7)	4.4 (39.9)	9.8 (49.6)	14.3 (57.7)	19.3 (66.7)	22.1 (71.8)	20.7 (69.3)	15.8 (60.4)	9.8 (49.6)	3.0 (37.4)	−2.6 (27.3)	9.3 (48.7)
Record low °C (°F)	−13.7 (7.3)	−10.6 (12.9)	−8.8 (16.2)	−1.4 (29.5)	2.2 (36.0)	10.1 (50.2)	14.8 (58.6)	12.0 (53.6)	5.0 (41.0)	−3.5 (25.7)	−9.0 (15.8)	−16.5 (2.3)	−16.5 (2.3)
Average precipitation mm (inches)	5.8 (0.23)	10.5 (0.41)	23.5 (0.93)	43.8 (1.72)	61.9 (2.44)	67.4 (2.65)	92.6 (3.65)	93.4 (3.68)	98.9 (3.89)	59.9 (2.36)	27.2 (1.07)	5.1 (0.20)	590 (23.23)
Average precipitation days (≥ 0.1 mm)	3.7	4.1	5.7	7.0	8.5	8.1	9.7	9.3	11.5	9.2	5.7	3.0	85.5
Average snowy days	4.2	3.0	1.3	0.1	0	0	0	0	0	0	1.2	2.8	12.6
Average relative humidity (%)	61	60	59	61	61	59	70	76	79	77	72	63	67
Mean monthly sunshine hours	126.4	130.0	169.8	202.1	215.2	218.5	220.9	192.6	141.5	125.2	125.4	130.0	1,997.6
Percentage possible sunshine	40	42	45	51	50	51	51	47	39	36	41	43	45
Source: China Meteorological Administration
