= Laodonglu station =

Laodonglu station (劳动路站) or Laodong Road station may refer to:

- Laodonglu station (Suzhou Metro)
- Laodonglu station (Xi'an Metro)
