= Line 10 (Xi'an Metro) =

Metro line in Xi'an, China

- 10
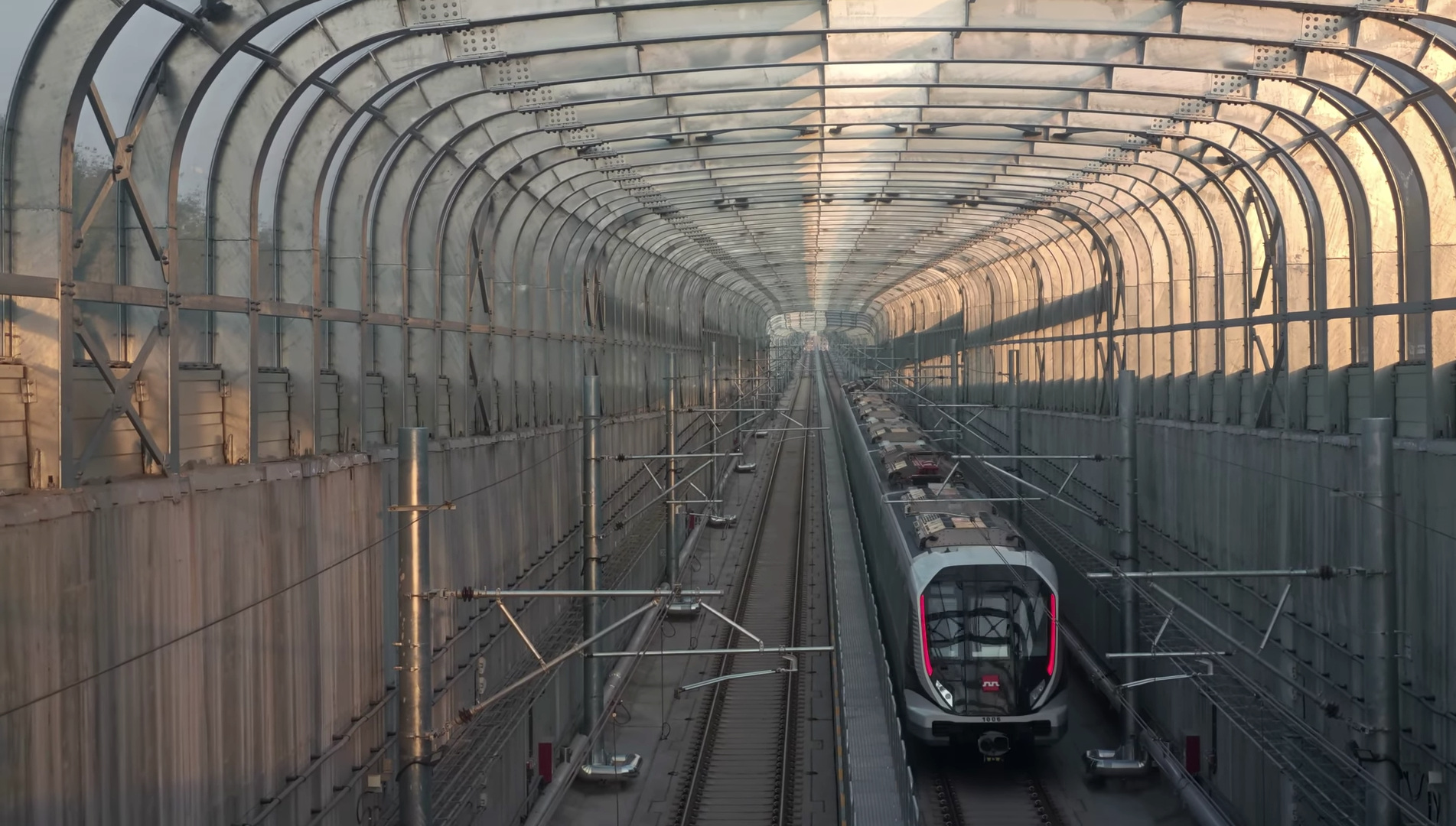
- A train of Xi'an Metro Line 10

Overview
- Status: Operational
- Termini: Jingshangcun; Zhaohuiguangchang
- Stations: 17

Service
- Type: Rapid transit
- System: Xi'an Metro

History
- Opened: 26 September 2024; 21 months ago

Technical
- Line length: 34.4 km (21.4 mi)
- Character: Underground & Elevated
- Track gauge: 1,435 mm (4 ft 8 1/2 in)

Line 10 of Xi'an Metro (Chinese: 西安地铁10号线; pinyin: Xī'ān Dìtiě Shí Hào Xiàn) is a rapid transit line in Xi'an, China. It's the first metro line in Gaoling District, Xi'an.

== Opening timeline ==
Segment	Commencement	Length	Station(s)	Name
Jingshangcun — Zhaohuiguangchang	26 September 2024	34.4 km (21.38 mi)	17	Phase 1

== Stations ==
Station name		Connections	Location
English	Chinese	Connections	Location
Jingshangcun	井上村	8	Weiyang
Mao'erzhong	帽珥冢		Weiyang
Tuanjiecun	团结村		Weiyang
Hongqichang	红旗厂		Weiyang
Xi'angongda · Wudelu	西安工大·武德路	14	Weiyang
Jingjiabu	景家堡		Weiyang
Weiyanghu	未央湖		Weiyang
Xibu	西堡		Baqiao
Shuiliu	水流		Baqiao
Jingweibandao	泾渭半岛		Gaoling
Yangguanzhai	杨官寨		Gaoling
Junzhuang	军庄		Gaoling
Chonghuang	崇皇		Gaoling
Yuchu	榆楚		Gaoling
Luyuandadao	鹿苑大道		Gaoling
Xingwang	杏王		Gaoling
Zhaohuiguangchang	昭慧广场		Gaoling

== Accidents ==
On 18 April 2024, a train testing line 10 crashed into the rear-end of another train due to a fault, causing the death of one engineer and two injuries.

== Future development ==
The southern extension from Jingshangcun to Yanxianglubeikou is under planning. The extension will add 3 interchange stations: Kangfulu (Line 1), Jiaotongdaxue · Xingqinggong (Line 6) and Yanxianglubeikou (Line 5).
