= Fengxiwenhuagongyuan station =

Metro station in Xi'an, China

Fengxiwenhuagongyuan 沣西文化公园
- Station exterior

Chinese name
- Traditional Chinese: 灃西文化公園
- Simplified Chinese: 沣西文化公园
- Literal meaning: Fengxi culture park
Transcriptions
Standard Mandarin
- Hanyu Pinyin: Fēngxī wénhuà gōngyuán
- Wade–Giles: Fêng^{1}-hsi^{1} wên^{2}-hua^{4} kung^{1}-yüan^{2}
- IPA: [fə́ŋ.ɕí wə̌n.xwâ kʊ́ŋ.ɥɛ̌n]

General information
- Location: Chang'an District, Xi'an, Shaanxi; China
- Coordinates: 34.2702°N 108.6967°E
- Operator: Xi'an Metro Co. Ltd.
- Line: Line 5
- Platforms: 2 (1 island platform)

Construction
- Structure type: Elevated

History
- Opened: 28 December 2020

Services
| Preceding station | Xi'an Metro | Following station |
|---|---|---|
| Diaotai towards Chuangxingang | Line 5 | Dongmafang towards Xi'an Dongzhan |
Location

Fengxiwenhuagongyuan station (Chinese: 沣西文化公园站) is a station of Line 5 of the Xi'an Metro. It started operations on 28 December 2020.
