= Qingshaonianzhongxin station =

Metro station in Xi'an, China

Qingshaonianzhongxin 青少年中心
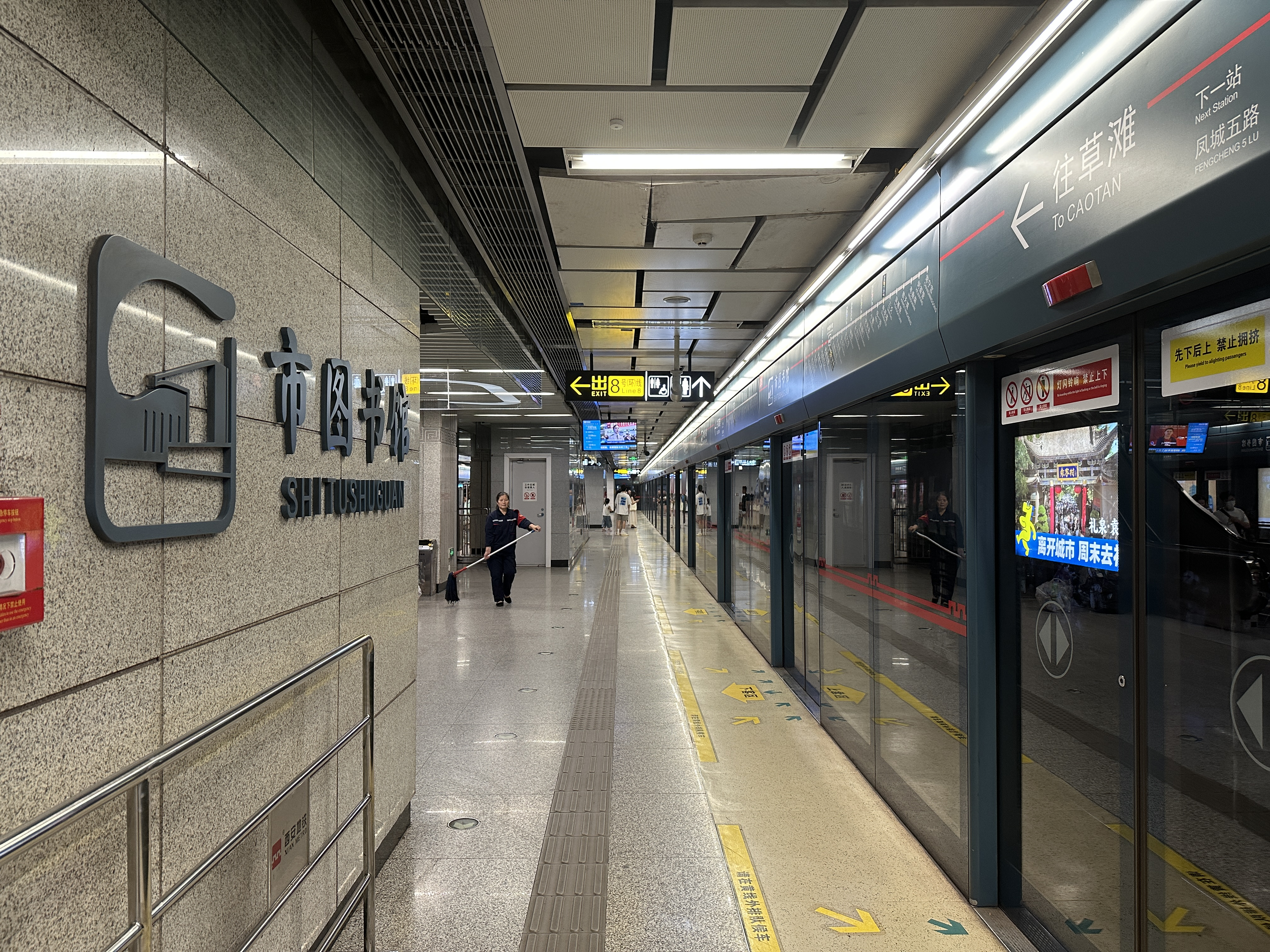
- Line 2 platform

General information
- Other names: Shitushuguan (until 25 July 2025)
- Location: Weiyang Road × Fengcheng 2nd Road; Weiyang District, Xi'an, Shaanxi; China
- Coordinates: 34°19′10″N 108°56′33″E
- System: Xi'an Metro
- Operator: Xi'an Metro Co. Ltd.
- Lines: Line 2 Line 8
- Platforms: 4 (2 island platforms)

Construction
- Structure type: Underground
- Accessible: Yes

History
- Opened: 16 September 2011

Services
| Preceding station | Xi'an Metro | Following station |
|---|---|---|
| Fengcheng 5-lu towards Caotan | Line 2 | Daminggongxi towards Changninggong |
| Shidi-sanyiyuan Clockwise | Line 8 | Bachengmen Counter-clockwise |
Location

Qingshaonianzhongxin station (Chinese: 青少年中心站; lit. 'Young Children's Center'), formerly known as Shitushuguan station (simplified Chinese: 市图书馆站; traditional Chinese: 市圖書館站; lit. 'City Library'), is an interchange station between Line 2 and Line 8 of the Xi'an Metro which started operations on 16 September 2011. It has been renamed on 25 July 2025.
