= Gaoling, Xi'an =

Gaoling 高陵区 Kaoling
- District
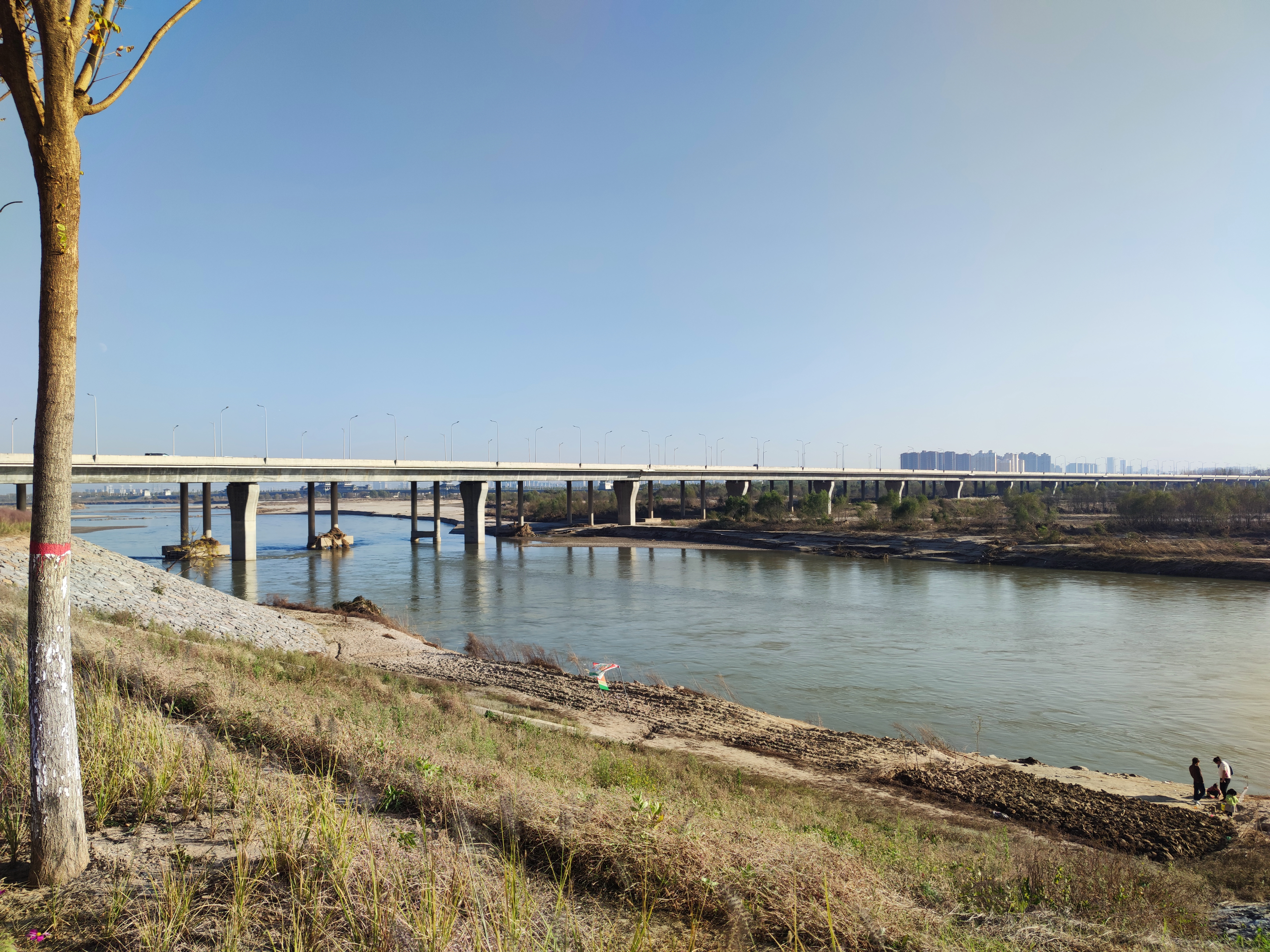
- Interactive map of Gaoling
- Coordinates: 34°30′22″N 109°03′04″E
- District: People's Republic of China
- Province: Shaanxi
- Prefecture-level city: Xi'an

Area
  - Total: 285.03 km^{2} (110.05 sq mi)

Population (2020)
  - Total: 416,996
  - Density: 1,463.0/km^{2} (3,789.1/sq mi)
- Time zone: UTC+8 (China Standard)
- Postal code: 7102XX

Gaoling District (simplified Chinese: 高陵区; traditional Chinese: 高陵區; pinyin: Gāolíng Qū) is one of 11 urban districts of the prefecture-level city of Xi'an, the capital of Shaanxi Province, Northwest China. The most densely populated of the ten districts of Xi'an, the district borders the prefecture-level city of Xianyang to the northwest, Lintong District to the east, Baqiao District to the south, and Weiyang District to the southwest.

== Administrative divisions ==
As of 2020, Gaoling District is divided to 7 subdistricts.

Subdistricts

- Luyuan Subdistrict (鹿苑街道)
- Jingwei Subdistrict (泾渭街道)
- Chonghuang Subdistrict (崇皇街道)
- Jijia Subdistrict (姬家街道)
- Gengzhen Subdistrict (耿镇街道)
- Zhangbo Subdistrict (张卜街道)
- Tongyuan Subdistrict (通远街道)

== Climate ==
Climate data for Gaoling District, elevation 385 m (1,263 ft), (1991–2020 normals, extremes 1991–present)
Month	Jan	Feb	Mar	Apr	May	Jun	Jul	Aug	Sep	Oct	Nov	Dec	Year
Record high °C (°F)	17.8 (64.0)	23.1 (73.6)	32.4 (90.3)	35.5 (95.9)	38.7 (101.7)	42.9 (109.2)	41.7 (107.1)	39.2 (102.6)	37.2 (99.0)	34.2 (93.6)	25.4 (77.7)	18.5 (65.3)	42.9 (109.2)
Mean daily maximum °C (°F)	5.1 (41.2)	9.5 (49.1)	15.4 (59.7)	21.8 (71.2)	26.9 (80.4)	32.4 (90.3)	33.1 (91.6)	30.4 (86.7)	25.7 (78.3)	20.1 (68.2)	12.7 (54.9)	6.6 (43.9)	20.0 (68.0)
Daily mean °C (°F)	−0.3 (31.5)	3.7 (38.7)	9.1 (48.4)	15.3 (59.5)	20.3 (68.5)	25.7 (78.3)	27.4 (81.3)	25.2 (77.4)	20.2 (68.4)	14.3 (57.7)	7.0 (44.6)	1.1 (34.0)	14.1 (57.4)
Mean daily minimum °C (°F)	−4.4 (24.1)	−0.8 (30.6)	4.0 (39.2)	9.4 (48.9)	14.2 (57.6)	19.6 (67.3)	22.7 (72.9)	21.1 (70.0)	16.1 (61.0)	9.9 (49.8)	2.7 (36.9)	−3.0 (26.6)	9.3 (48.7)
Record low °C (°F)	−16.3 (2.7)	−10.1 (13.8)	−5.4 (22.3)	0.0 (32.0)	2.1 (35.8)	9.8 (49.6)	15.9 (60.6)	13.0 (55.4)	5.0 (41.0)	−3.4 (25.9)	−8.6 (16.5)	−18.3 (−0.9)	−18.3 (−0.9)
Average precipitation mm (inches)	5.3 (0.21)	8.9 (0.35)	21.2 (0.83)	34.0 (1.34)	50.8 (2.00)	57.5 (2.26)	80.1 (3.15)	81.0 (3.19)	89.4 (3.52)	52.5 (2.07)	21.8 (0.86)	4.4 (0.17)	506.9 (19.95)
Average precipitation days (≥ 0.1 mm)	3.4	3.8	5.5	6.9	8.4	7.6	9.3	9.2	10.8	9.3	5.6	2.7	82.5
Average snowy days	3.9	2.8	1.0	0	0	0	0	0	0	0	1.2	2.5	11.4
Average relative humidity (%)	65	63	62	66	66	60	69	77	79	77	74	67	69
Mean monthly sunshine hours	132.1	134.8	175.0	202.7	217.0	216.1	230.8	205.5	147.6	134.6	132.3	140.4	2,068.9
Percentage possible sunshine	42	43	47	52	50	50	53	50	40	39	43	46	46
Source: China Meteorological Administration

== Transport ==
- Line 10, Xi'an Metro
