= Jingwei Subdistrict, Xi'an =

Jingwei Subdistrict 泾渭街道
- Subdistrict
- Location in China
- Coordinates: 34°26′44″N 108°58′56″E
- Country: People's Republic of China
- Province: Shaanxi
- Prefecture-level city: Xi'an
- District: Gaoling District
- Time zone: UTC+8 (China Standard)

Jingwei Subdistrict (simplified Chinese: 泾渭街道; traditional Chinese: 涇渭街道; pinyin: Jīngwèi Jiēdào) is a subdistrict in Gaoling District, Xi'an, Shaanxi, China.

As of 2023, it administers the following twelve residential communities and six villages:

- Changqinglongfengyuan Community (长庆龙凤园社区)
- Daokou Community (道口社区)
- Jingxinyuan Community (泾欣园社区)
- Jingweidonglu Community (泾渭东路社区)
- Jingweizhonglu Community (泾渭中路社区)
- Jingweixilu Community (泾渭西路社区)
- Weibin Community (渭滨社区)
- Nanwangzhai Community (赧王寨社区)
- Hanyang Community (汉阳社区)
- Jinfeng Community (金凤社区)
- Yulong Community (玉龙社区)
- Hongyatou Community (红崖头社区)
- Mijiaya Village (米家崖村)
- Liangcunyuan Village (粱村塬村)
- Dianziwang Village (店子王村)
- Xiying Village (西营村)
- Leijia Village (雷贾村)
- Chenjiatan Village (陈家滩村)

== See also ==
- List of township-level divisions of Shaanxi
