= Laodonglu station (Xi'an Metro) =

Metro station in Xi'an, China

Laodong Lu 劳动路
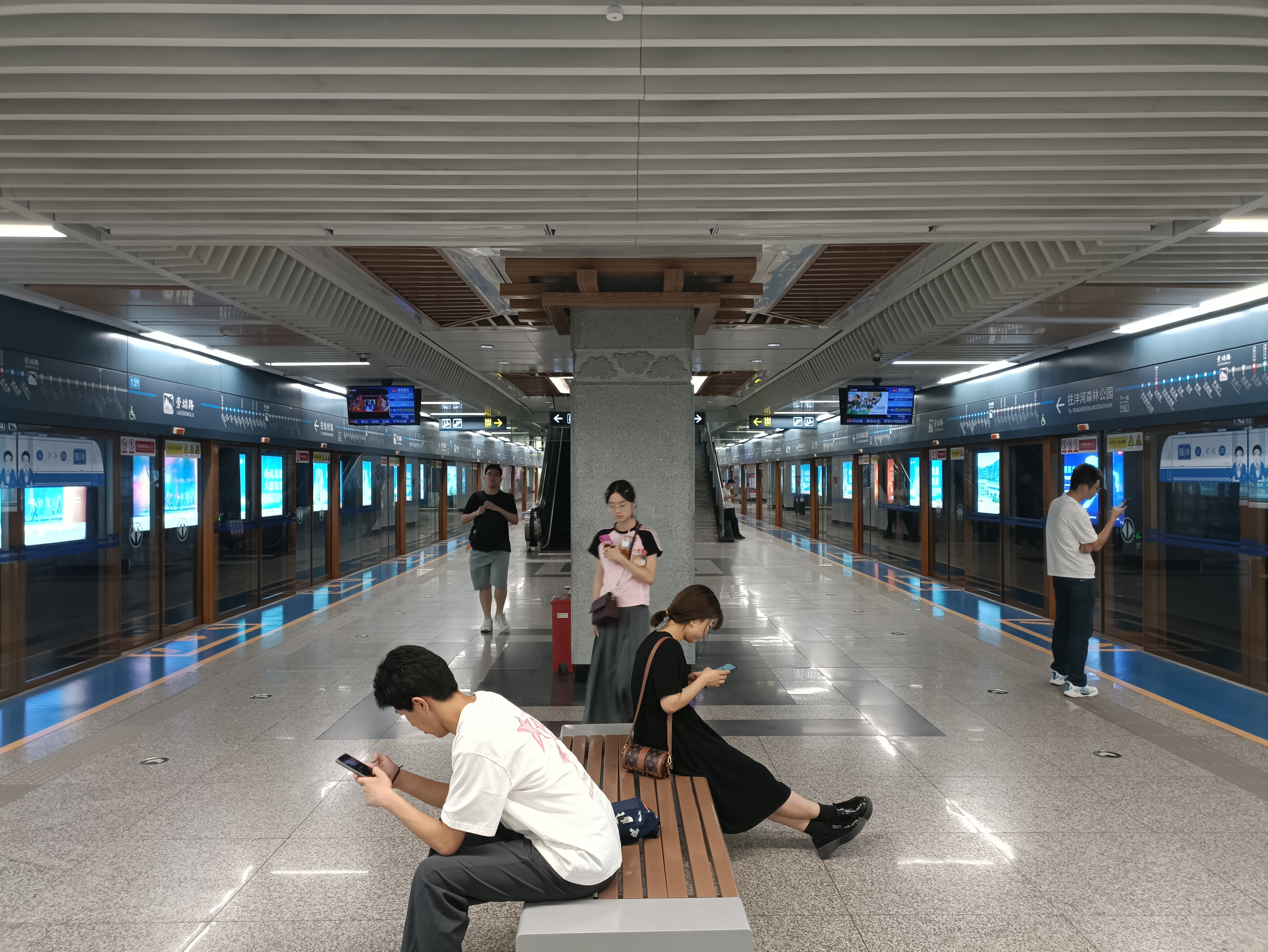

General information
- Location: Lianhu District, Xi'an, Shaanxi; China
- Coordinates: 34.2711°N 108.9053°E
- Operated by: Xi'an Metro Co. Ltd.
- Line: Line 1
- Platforms: 2 (1 island platform)

Construction
- Structure type: Underground

History
- Opened: 15 September 2013

Services
Preceding station	Xi'an Metro	Following station
Kaiyuanmen towards Xianyangxizhan	Line 1	Yuxiangmen towards Fangzhicheng
Location

Laodong Lu station (Chinese: 劳动路站) is a station of Line 1 of the Xi'an Metro. It started operations on 15 September 2013.
