= Huyi, Xi'an =

Huyi 鄠邑区
- District
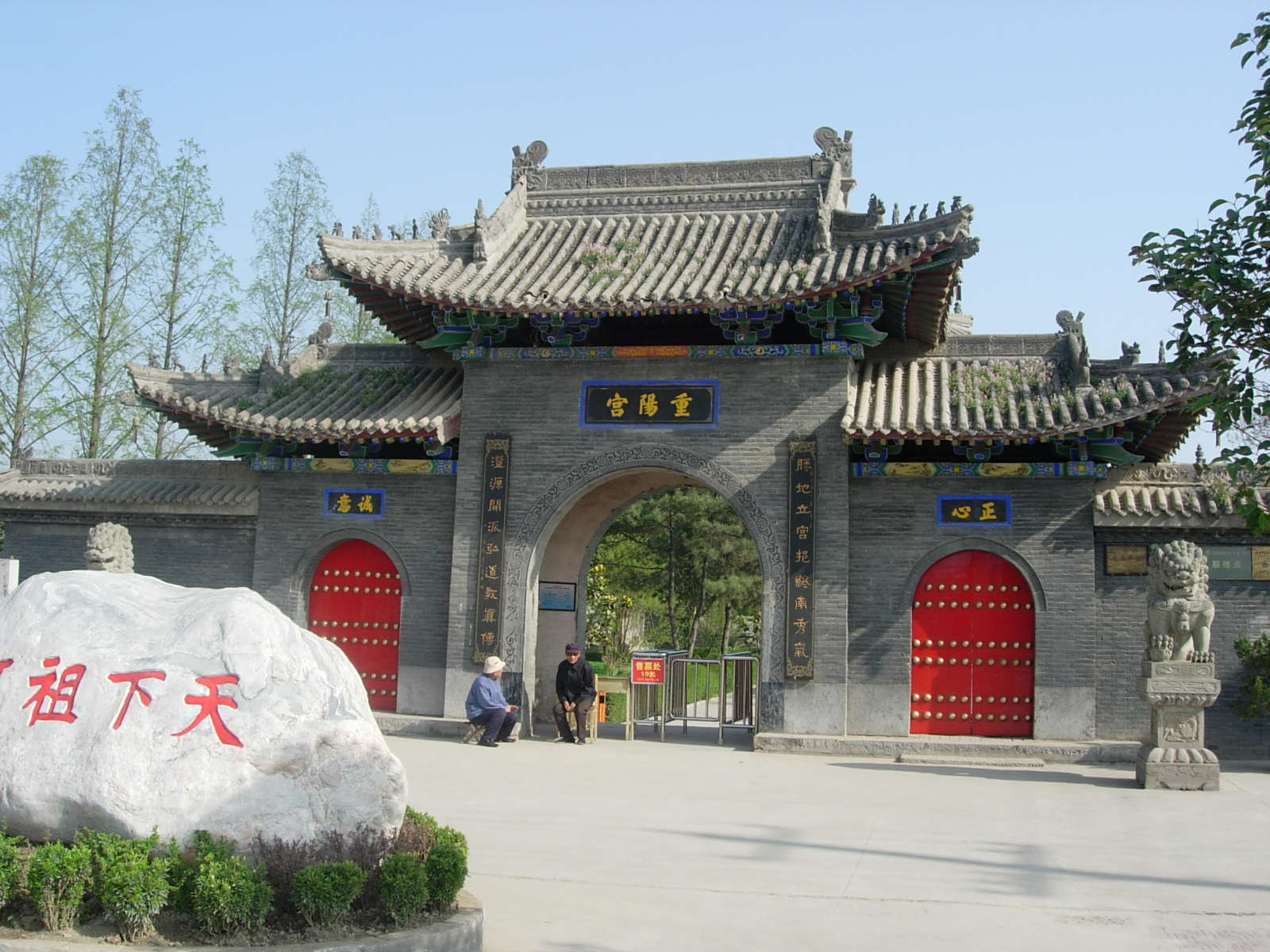
- Interactive map of Huyi
- Coordinates: 34°06′47″N 108°36′22″E
- Country: People's Republic of China
- Province: Shaanxi
- Sub-provincial city: Xi'an

Area
  - Total: 1,282 km^{2} (495 sq mi)

Population (2019)
  - Total: 564,600
  - Density: 440.4/km^{2} (1,141/sq mi)
- Time zone: UTC+8 (China Standard)
- Postal code: 710300
- Area code: (0)029
- Website: www.xahy.gov.cn

Huyi District (Chinese: 鄠邑区; pinyin: Hùyì Qū), formerly known as Hu County or Huxian (simplified Chinese: 户县; traditional Chinese: 戶縣, written as 鄠縣/鄠县 before 1964, pinyin: Hù Xiàn (same for both ways of writing)), is one of 11 urban districts of the prefecture-level city of Xi'an, the capital of Shaanxi Province, Northwest China. The district was approved to establish from the former Hu County (户县) by the Chinese State Council on November 24, 2016. As of 2018, its population was 558,600. The district borders the prefecture-level cities of Xianyang to the north and Ankang to the south and Chang'an District to the east.

It has an area of 1,255 km^{2} (485 sq mi), and contains 11 towns and five townships. Towards its south the district is bordered by the Qin Mountains and to the north by the Weihe River. Thirty-six rivers run through the area, making the land very fertile. Fifty-five acres of land are arable and 52.4 acres of land are covered by forests. The region has an abundance of minerals such as gold, silver, copper, iron, limestone and marble.

In 2010 GDP reached 100 billion Yuan (about US$2000 per capita).

== Climate ==
The district enjoys a warm tropical climate, free of extreme temperatures, with an average temperature of around 13.3 degrees Celsius (55 °F). The most pleasant months are in spring between March and May and September to November. The winters are cold but not excessively so, with an average temperature of -1 Celsius (30 °F) in January. The summers are warm and dry with most of the precipitation coming in the autumn.

Climate data for Huyi District, elevation 411 m (1,348 ft), (1991–2020 normals, extremes 1991–present)
Month	Jan	Feb	Mar	Apr	May	Jun	Jul	Aug	Sep	Oct	Nov	Dec	Year
Record high °C (°F)	18.5 (65.3)	22.9 (73.2)	31.5 (88.7)	36.7 (98.1)	39.7 (103.5)	41.9 (107.4)	42.3 (108.1)	40.1 (104.2)	37.7 (99.9)	31.9 (89.4)	26.1 (79.0)	18.6 (65.5)	42.3 (108.1)
Mean daily maximum °C (°F)	5.4 (41.7)	9.6 (49.3)	15.7 (60.3)	22.2 (72.0)	27.2 (81.0)	31.9 (89.4)	32.9 (91.2)	30.6 (87.1)	25.4 (77.7)	19.4 (66.9)	12.8 (55.0)	6.9 (44.4)	20.0 (68.0)
Daily mean °C (°F)	0.5 (32.9)	4.3 (39.7)	9.9 (49.8)	16.0 (60.8)	20.9 (69.6)	25.7 (78.3)	27.4 (81.3)	25.5 (77.9)	20.5 (68.9)	14.5 (58.1)	7.8 (46.0)	2.0 (35.6)	14.6 (58.2)
Mean daily minimum °C (°F)	−2.8 (27.0)	0.5 (32.9)	5.5 (41.9)	11.1 (52.0)	15.7 (60.3)	20.4 (68.7)	22.9 (73.2)	21.6 (70.9)	17.0 (62.6)	11.2 (52.2)	4.4 (39.9)	−1.3 (29.7)	10.5 (50.9)
Record low °C (°F)	−14.5 (5.9)	−9.4 (15.1)	−4.2 (24.4)	0.4 (32.7)	5.0 (41.0)	11.0 (51.8)	16.6 (61.9)	14.7 (58.5)	7.8 (46.0)	1.1 (34.0)	−7.8 (18.0)	−13.5 (7.7)	−14.5 (5.9)
Average precipitation mm (inches)	7.1 (0.28)	12.0 (0.47)	28.9 (1.14)	44.4 (1.75)	62.0 (2.44)	76.4 (3.01)	90.9 (3.58)	97.3 (3.83)	115.7 (4.56)	62.8 (2.47)	25.9 (1.02)	5.2 (0.20)	628.6 (24.75)
Average precipitation days (≥ 0.1 mm)	3.8	4.5	7.1	7.6	9.7	9.2	10.4	9.9	11.9	10.8	6.2	3.1	94.2
Average snowy days	4.6	3.2	1.3	0.1	0	0	0	0	0	0	1.2	2.9	13.3
Average relative humidity (%)	64	64	62	63	62	60	68	75	78	78	73	66	68
Mean monthly sunshine hours	126.9	125.3	160.4	180.5	202.8	203.6	207.3	179.1	133.5	124.0	125.9	129.5	1,898.8
Percentage possible sunshine	40	40	43	46	47	47	48	44	36	36	41	42	43
Source: China Meteorological Administration

== Administrative divisions ==
As of 2020, Huyi District is divided to 8 subdistricts and 6 towns.

Subdistricts

- Ganting Subdistrict (甘亭街道)
- Yuxia Subdistrict (余下街道)
- Yuchan Subdistrict (玉蝉街道)
- Wuzhu Subdistrict (五竹街道)
- Dawang Subdistrict (大王街道)
- Qindu Subdistrict (秦渡街道)
- Caotang Subdistrict (草堂街道)
- Pangguang Subdistrict (庞光街道)

Towns

- Zu'an (祖庵镇)
- Jiangcun (蒋村镇)
- Laodian (涝店镇)
- Ganhe (甘河镇)
- Shijing (石井镇)
- Weifeng (渭丰镇)

== Economy ==
This district is one of the main sources of Aggregata.

== Herbs ==
There are 340 kinds of medicinal herbs that grow wild in the area including Iris, Aggregata, Bupleurum, Tianma, Honeysuckle, Fritillaria, and Schisandra.

== Demographics ==
The district has a male population of 303,400 and female population of 274,600 (1.1 male:1 female). The majority of the district's population is rural at 477,400, while the urban population is 100,600 (roughly 86.45% and 16.55% respectively). The population density is 477 people per square kilometer. Population density in urban areas can reach as high as 3400 per square kilometer, and can be as low as 11 per square kilometer in rural areas. Han make up 99.88% of the population, although 21 other ethnic groups also live there.

== Transport ==
- Xi'an–Huyi railway (operated by Xi'an Rail Transit Group since November 2022): Huxian station
- Xi'an–Chengdu high-speed railway (operated by China Railway Xi'an Group): Huyi railway station

== Tourism ==
Tourist attractions

Huyi district is famous for a variety of tourist attractions. Tourists can enjoy the landscape of this region, especially in two national parks—Taiping National Forest Park and Zhuque National Forest Park, which offer a great view of mountains and waterfalls. It is also the home to two famous temples: Caotang Temple and Chongyang Palace, where Wang Chongyang, founder of Quanzhen School, practiced Taoism and where he was buried. It is said that great ancient Chinese poets such as Du Fu, Cen Shen, Su Shi, and Cheng Hao visited Meibei Lake, which lies to the west of the downtown area of Huyi District.
