= Shengrenminyiyuan · Huangyancun station =

Metro station in Xi'an, China

Shengrenminyiyuan · Huangyancun 省人民医院·黄雁村

Chinese name
- Traditional Chinese: 省人民醫院·黃雁村
- Simplified Chinese: 省人民医院·黄雁村
- Literal meaning: Provincial People's Hospital · Huangyancun
Transcriptions
Standard Mandarin
- Hanyu Pinyin: Shěng rénmín yīyuàn · Huángyàncūn
- Wade–Giles: Shêng^{3} jên^{2}-min^{2} i^{1}-yüan^{4} · Huang^{2}-yen^{4}-ts‘un^{1}
- IPA: [ʂə̀ŋ ɻə̌n.mǐn í.ɥɛ̂n xwǎŋ.jɛ̂n.tsʰwə́n]

General information
- Location: Beilin District, Xi'an, Shaanxi; China
- Coordinates: 34.2428°N 108.9284°E
- Operator: Xi'an Metro Co. Ltd.
- Line: Line 5
- Platforms: 2 (1 island platform)

Construction
- Structure type: Underground

History
- Opened: 28 December 2020
- Former names: Huangyancun

Services
Preceding station	Xi'an Metro	Following station
Bianjiacun towards Chuangxingang	Line 5	Nanshaomen towards Xi'an Dongzhan
Location

Shengrenminyiyuan · Huangyancun station (Chinese: 省人民医院·黄雁村站) is a station of Line 5 of the Xi'an Metro. It started operations on 28 December 2020.
