= Qinglongsi station =

Metro station in Xi'an, China

Qinglongsi 青龙寺
- Line 3 platform

Chinese name
- Traditional Chinese: 青龍寺
- Simplified Chinese: 青龙寺
- Literal meaning: Qinglong Temple
Transcriptions
Standard Mandarin
- Hanyu Pinyin: Qīnglóngsì
- Wade–Giles: Ch‘ing^{1}-lung^{2}-ssŭ^{4}
- IPA: [tɕʰíŋ.lʊ̌ŋ.sɨ̂]

General information
- Location: Yanta District, Xi'an, Shaanxi; China
- Operator: Xi'an Metro Co. Ltd.
- Lines: Line 3 Line 5
- Platforms: 4 (2 island platforms)

Construction
- Structure type: Underground

History
- Opened: Line 3: 8 November 2016; Line 5: 28 December 2020

Services
Preceding station	Xi'an Metro	Following station
Beichitou towards Yuhuazhai	Line 3	Yanxingmen (Shapo) towards Baoshuiqu
Yanxianglubeikou towards Chuangxingang	Line 5	Ligongdaqujiangxiaoqu towards Xi'an Dongzhan
Location

Qinglongsi station (Chinese: 青龙寺站) is an interchange station of Line 3 and Line 5 of the Xi'an Metro located in Xi'an's Yanta District. It started operations on 8 November 2016.

== Station layout ==
G	Exits	Exits A, C, E–H
L1; 5 lobby	North lobby	Ticket machines, customer service, passageway to exits F, G
L1; 5 lobby	South lobby	Ticket machines, customer service, passageway to exits E, H
L2	arrow for L	5 towards Chuangxingang (Yanxiangbeilukou)
L2	Island platform, doors open on the left
L2	arrow for R	5 towards Xi'an Dongzhan (Ligongdaqujiangxiaoqu)
L2	3 lobby	Ticket machines, customer service, passageway to exits A, C
L3; 3 platforms	arrow for L	3 towards Yuhuazhai (Beichitou)
L3; 3 platforms	Island platform, doors open on the left
L3; 3 platforms	arrow for R	3 towards Baoshuiqu (Yanxingmen (Shapo))

== Exits ==
Designation	Nearby landmarks	Image
A	Yanxiang Road, Xiying Road (N), Qinglong Temple	
C	Xiying Road (S), Yanxiang Road (E), China Railway First Survey and Design Institute Group Co., Ltd., Yanxingmen West Road	
D	Xin'an Road	
E	Xiying Road (S), Yanxiang Road (E), Northwest Hydropower Monitoring Center, Yanbo Road	
F	Yanxiang Road (E), Xiying Road (N)	
G	Xiying Road (N), Yanxiang Road (W), Qinglong Temple	
H	Xiying Road (S), Yanxiang Road (W), Xinkaimen North Road	
