= Xincheng, Xi'an =

Xincheng 新城区
- District
- Interactive map of Xincheng
- Coordinates: 34°15′54″N 108°59′21″E
- Country: People's Republic of China
- Province: Shaanxi
- Sub-provincial city: Xi'an

Area
  - Total: 31 km^{2} (12 sq mi)

Population (2019)
  - Total: 537,300
  - Density: 19,574.51/km^{2} (50,697.7/sq mi)
- Time zone: UTC+8 (China Standard)
- Postal code: 710000

Xincheng District (simplified Chinese: 新城区; traditional Chinese: 新城區; pinyin: Xīnchéng Qū; lit. 'new city') is one of 11 urban districts of the prefecture-level city of Xi'an, the capital of Shaanxi Province, Northwest China. It includes the northwestern part of Xi'an's walled city, as well as a number of neighborhoods to the east and northeast. Xi'an railway station is within Xincheng District. The district borders the districts of Weiyang to the north, Baqiao to the east, Yanta to the south, Beilin to the southwest, and Lianhu to the west. Xincheng is also the seat of Shaanxi province.

== Administrative divisions ==
As of 2020, Xincheng District is divided to 9 subdistricts.

Subdistricts

- Xiyi Road Subdistrict (西一路街道)
- Changlezhonglu Subdistrict (长乐中路街道)
- Zhongshanmen Subdistrict (中山门街道)
- Hansenzhai Subdistrict (韩森寨街道)
- Jiefangmen Subdistrict (解放门街道)
- Ziqiang Road Subdistrict (自强路街道)
- Taihua Road Subdistrict (太华路街道)
- Changlexi Road Subdistrict (长乐西路街道)
- Hujiamiao Subdistrict (胡家庙街道)
