= Baqiao, Xi'an =

Baqiao 灞桥区
- District
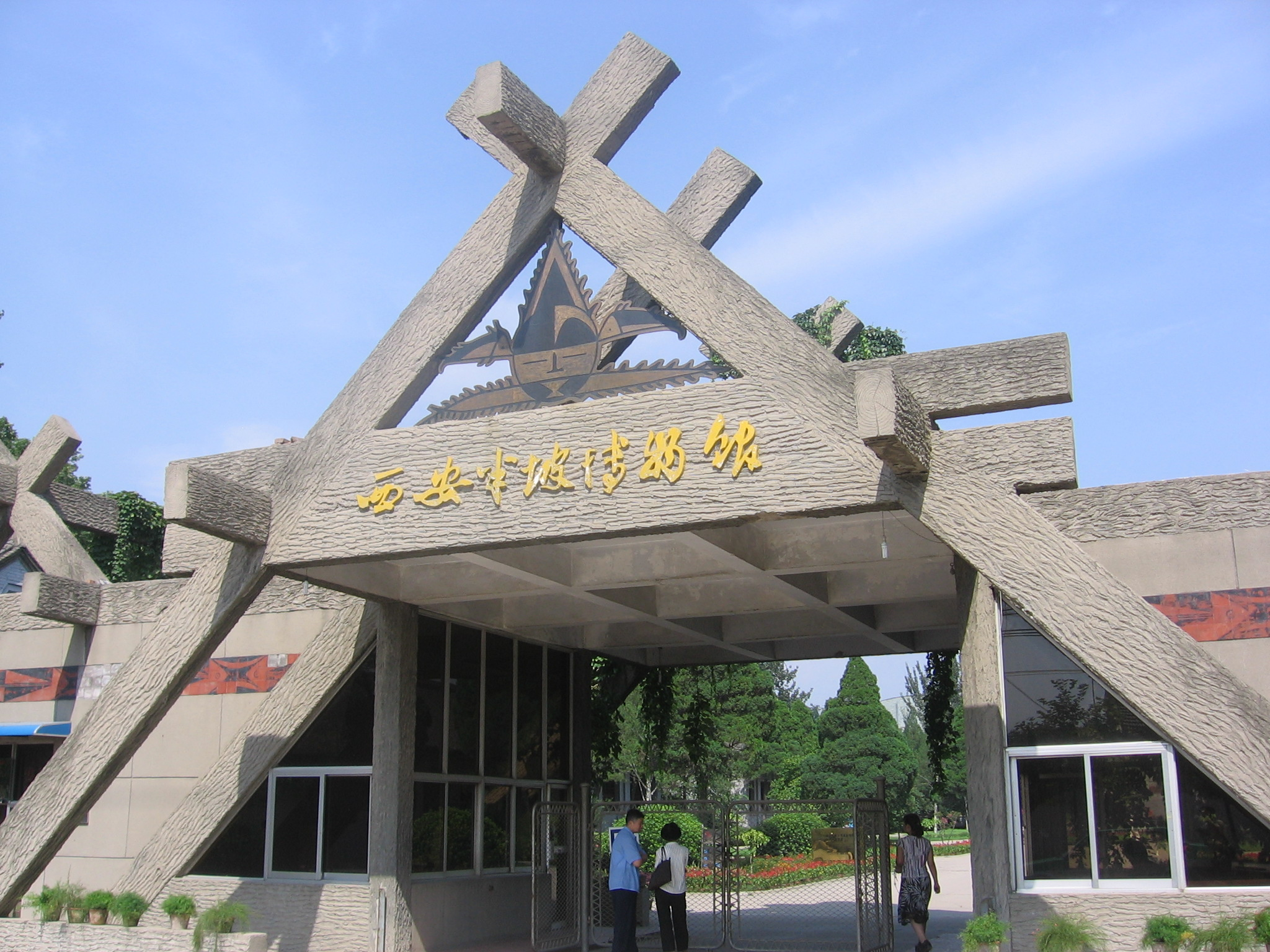

- Location of Baqiao District within China
- Coordinates: 34°18′39″N 109°08′12″E
- Country: People's Republic of China
- Province: Shaanxi
- Sub-provincial city: Xi'an

Area
  - Total: 322 km^{2} (124 sq mi)

Population (2018)
  - Total: 677,300
  - Density: 2,100/km^{2} (5,450/sq mi)
- Time zone: UTC+8 (China Standard)
- Postal code: 710038
- Website: baqiao.gov.cn

Baqiao District (Chinese: 灞桥区; pinyin: Bàqiáo Qū) is one of 11 districts of the prefecture-level city of Xi'an, the capital of Shaanxi Province, Northwest China. The district borders Gaoling District to the north, Lintong District to the northeast, Chang'an District to the southeast, Yanta and Xincheng Districts to the west, and Weiyang District to the northwest. The district spans an area of 332 square kilometres (128 mi^{2}), and has a population of 595,124 as of 2010.

== History ==
Population Census
Year	Pop.	±% p.a.
1990	402,163	—
2000	494,084	+2.08%
2010	595,124	+1.88%

Baqiao District was established in 1954, and had jurisdiction over five townships: Donggaoqiao (simplified Chinese: 东高桥; traditional Chinese: 東高橋), Egongdian (Chinese: 鄂公殿), Shuigou (simplified Chinese: 水沟; traditional Chinese: 水溝), Yongfeng (simplified Chinese: 永丰; traditional Chinese: 永豐), and Xinglin (Chinese: 杏林). In 1957, the former Changle District (simplified Chinese: 长乐区; traditional Chinese: 長樂區) was merged into Baqiao.

The district had a population of 402,163 in the Fourth Chinese Census, a population of 494,084 in the Fifth Chinese Census, and a population of 595,124 in the Sixth Chinese Census.

== Administrative divisions ==
Baqiao District has nine subdistricts. These subdistricts are further divided into 72 residential communities and 76 administrative villages.

Its subdistricts are Fangzhicheng Subdistrict, Shilipu Subdistrict, Hongqi Subdistrict, Xiwang Subdistrict, Hongqing Subdistrict, Dizhai Subdistrict, Baqiao Subdistrict, Xinzhu Subdistrict, and Xinhe Subdistrict.

== Economy ==
As of 2019, the district's GDP totaled ¥48.919 billion, an 8.3% increase from the previous year. Of this, ¥1.923 billion came from the district's primary sector, ¥13.773 billion came from the district's secondary sector, and the remaining ¥33.223 billion came from the district's tertiary sector. The per capita disposable income of the district's urban residents was ¥40,328, and was ¥17,969 for rural residents.

== Education ==
The district is home to the PLA Rocket Force University of Engineering.

== Transportation ==
=== Road ===
National Highway 310 and National Highway 312 pass through the district, as well as the G5 Expressway and the G30 Expressway.

=== Rail ===
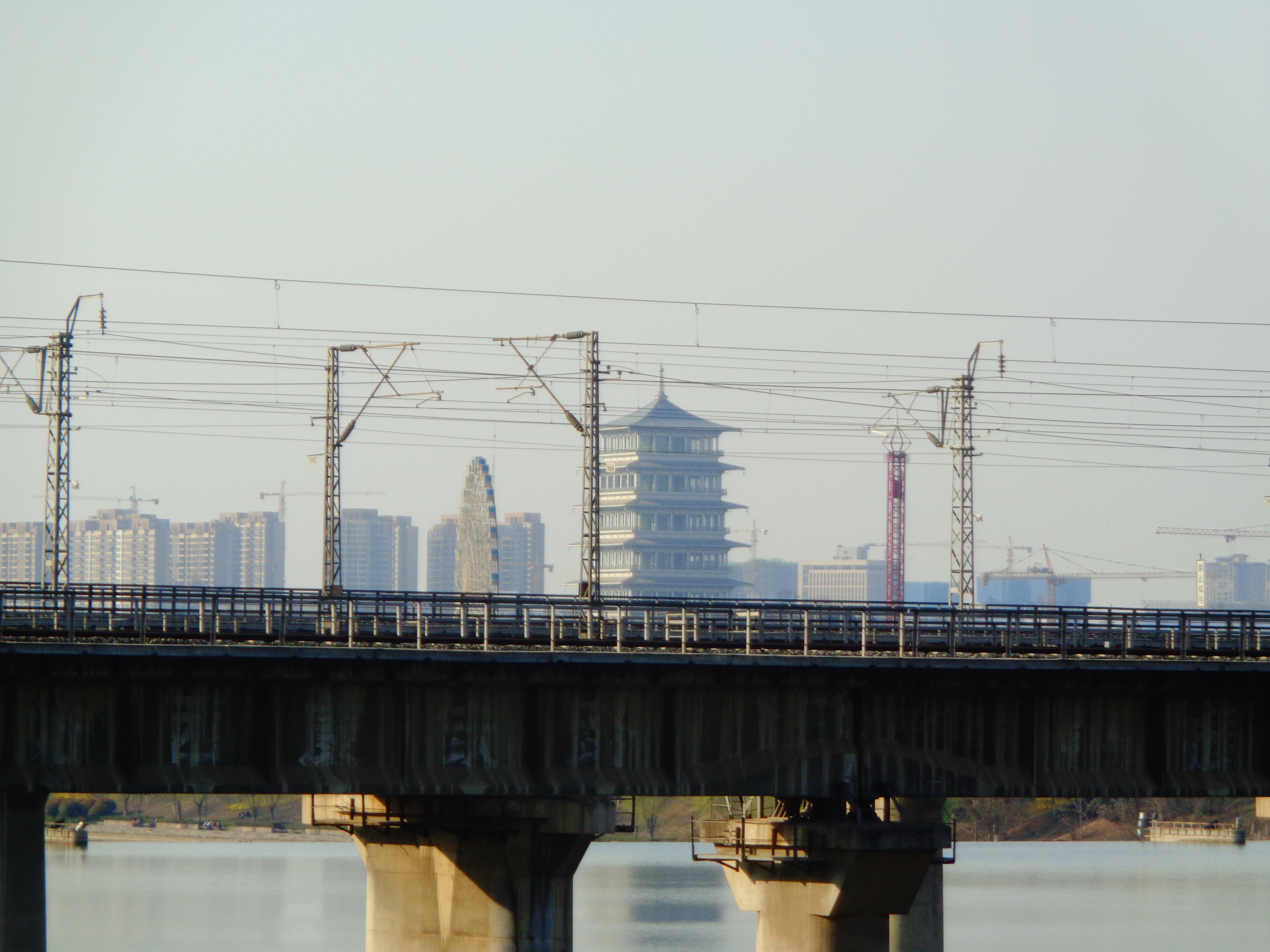
The Longhai railway in Baqiao District, with the Chang'an Pagoda in the background

The Longhai railway and the Xi'an–Ankang railway both pass through Baqiao District.

== Cultural sights ==
The district is the burial place of a number of Chinese emperors. The Tomb of Emperor Wen, the Tomb of Empress Dowager Bo, and the Tomb of Han Xin are all located in Baqiao District, serving as the locations for the burials of Emperor Wen of Han, Empress Dowager Bo, and Han Xin, respectively.

One of the Eight Views of Guanzhong, the ba liu feng xue (simplified Chinese: 灞柳风雪; traditional Chinese: 灞柳風雪), depicts what is present-day Baqiao District.
