= Chang'an, Xi'an =

Chang'an 长安区
- District
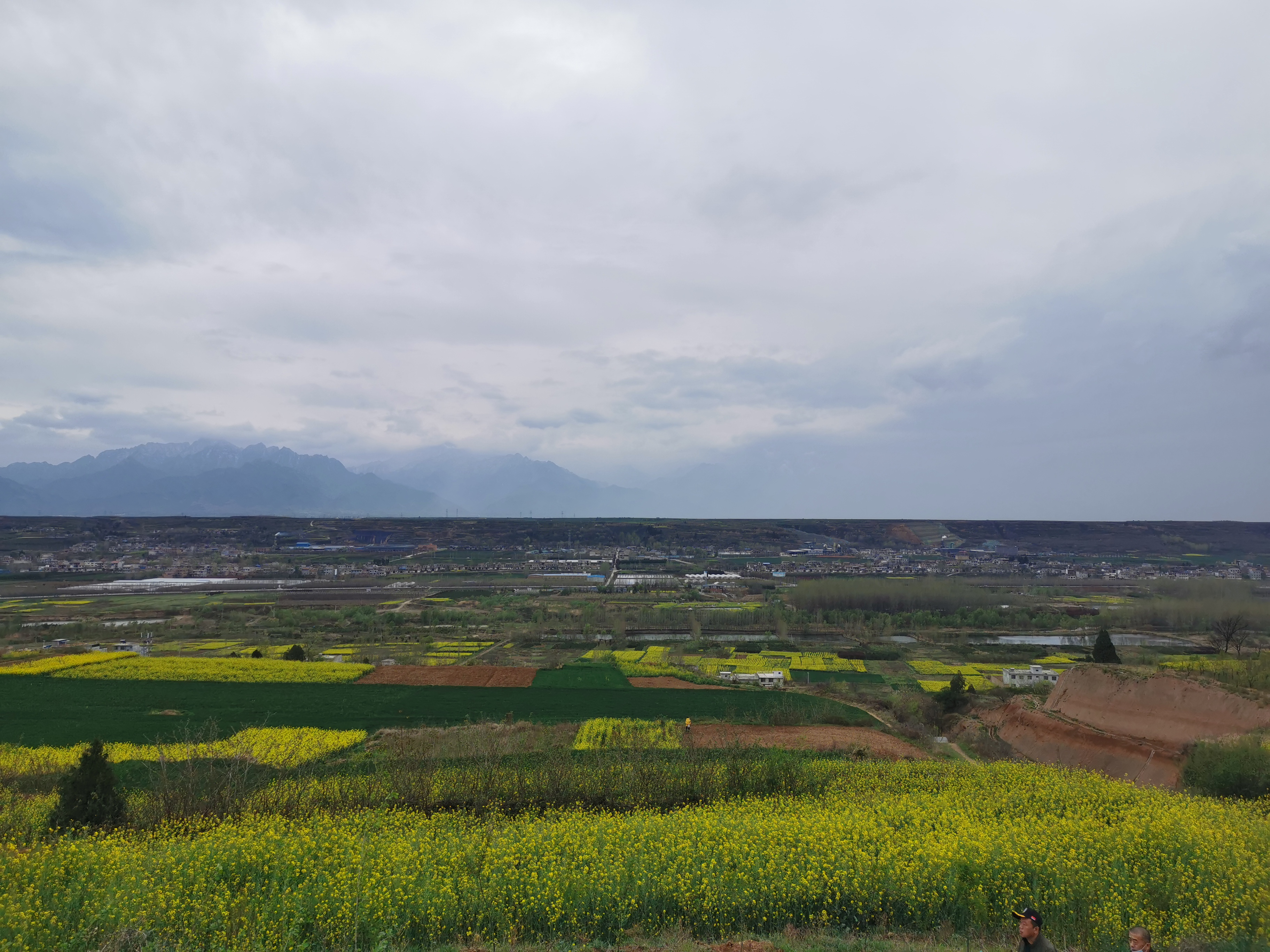
- View of the Qinling
- Interactive map of Chang'an
- Coordinates: 34°09′52″N 108°57′01″E
- Country: People's Republic of China
- Province: Shaanxi
- Sub-provincial city: Xi'an

Area
  - Total: 1,594 km^{2} (615 sq mi)

Population (2019)
  - Total: 1,045,300
  - Density: 681.94/km^{2} (1,766.2/sq mi)
- Time zone: UTC+8 (China Standard)
- Postal code: 710100

Chang'an District (Chinese: 长安区; pinyin: Cháng'ān Qū; lit. 'long peace') is the second-most populous of 11 urban districts of the prefecture-level city of Xi'an, the capital of Shaanxi Province, in Northwest China. The district borders the prefecture-level cities of Shangluo to the southeast and Ankang to the southwest, Weiyang and Yanta Districts to the north, Baqiao District to the northeast, Lantian County to the east, and Huyi District to the west.

== Administrative divisions ==
As of 2020, Chang'an District is divided to 25 subdistricts.

Subdistricts

- Weiqu Subdistrict (韦曲街道)
- Guodu Subdistrict (郭杜街道)
- Luanzhen Subdistrict (滦镇街道)
- Yinzhen Subdistrict (引镇街道)
- Wangsi Subdistrict (王寺街道)
- Mawang Subdistrict (马王街道)
- Taiyigong Subdistrict (太乙宫街道)
- Dongda Subdistrict (东大街道)
- Ziwu Subdistrict (子午街道)
- Doumen Subdistrict (斗门街道)
- Xiliu Subdistrict (细柳街道)
- Duqu Subdistrict (杜曲街道)
- Dazhao Subdistrict (大兆街道)
- Huangliang Subdistrict (黄良街道)
- Xinglong Subdistrict (兴隆街道)
- Wangqu Subdistrict (王曲街道)
- Mingdu Subdistrict (鸣犊街道)
- Wangmang Subdistrict (王莽街道)
- Wutai Subdistrict (五台街道)
- Gaoqiao Subdistrict (高桥街道)
- Wuxing Subdistrict (五星街道)
- Lingzhao Subdistrict (灵沼街道)
- Yangzhuang Subdistrict (杨庄街道)
- Paoli Subdistrict (砲里街道)
- Weizhai Subdistrict (魏寨街道)
