= Weiyang, Xi'an =

Weiyang 未央区
- District
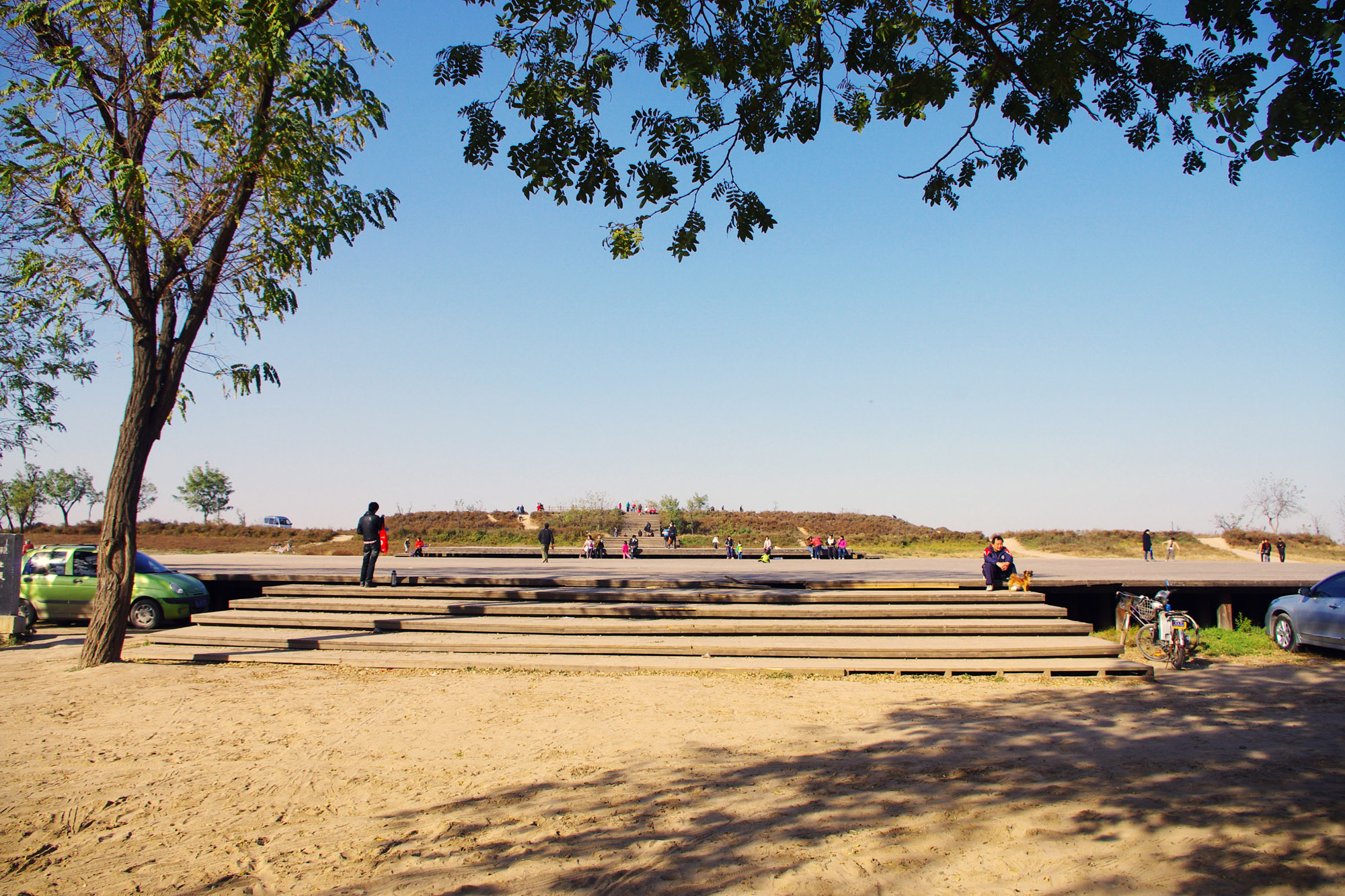
- Ruins of Weiyang Palace
- Interactive map of Weiyang
- Country: People's Republic of China
- Province: Shaanxi
- Sub-provincial city: Xi'an

Area
  - Total: 264.41 km^{2} (102.09 sq mi)

Population (2020)
  - Total: 733,403
  - Density: 2,773.7/km^{2} (7,183.9/sq mi)
- Time zone: UTC+8 (China Standard)
- Postal code: 710016
- Licence plates: 陕A

Weiyang District (simplified Chinese: 未央区; traditional Chinese: 未央區; pinyin: Wèiyāng Qū) is one of 11 urban districts and the seat of the prefecture-level city of Xi'an, the capital of Shaanxi Province, Northwest China. It is located at northwest Xi'an, functioning as the new administrative centre of the city. The district borders Baqiao District to the east, the city of Xianyang to the west, Xincheng District and Lianhu District to the north, as well as Yanta District and Changan District to the southwest. The geographical coordinates are 34°14'50''N ~ 34°26'22''N, 108°47'08''E ~ 109°02'21''E, and the total area is 264.41 square kilometers. By November 11, 2020, the total population of permanent residents in the district is 733,403, taking up around 5.66% of the city's population.

Weiyang District had significant historical importance. It is named after the ruins of Weiyang Palace of the Han dynasty which is located inside the district, meaning "the prosperity never ends" (繁荣兴盛，不尽不衰). It is also the origin of the Silk Road. 11 ancient dynasties built their capitals inside the modern time Weiyang District, including Qin, Western Han, Eastern Han, Western Wei, Northern Zhou, etc. Among the many historical relics located in this district, Site of Epang Palace, Site of Daming Palace, and Han Chang'an City Site were listed in the first batch of Chinese national key cultural relics protection sites in 1961 by the State Council of the People's Republic of China.

== Administrative divisions ==
=== Subdistricts ===
As of 2021, Weiyang District contains 11 subdistricts.

- Zhangjiabao Subdistrict (张家堡街道)
- Sanqiao Subdistrict (三桥街道)
- Xinjiamiao Subdistrict (辛家庙街道)
- Xujiawan Subdistrict (徐家湾街道)
- Daminggong Subdistrict (大明宫街道)
- Tanjia Subdistrict (谭家街道)
- Caotan Subdistrict (草滩街道)
- Liucunbao Subdistrict (六村堡街道)
- Weiyanggong Subdistrict (未央宫街道)
- Hancheng Subdistrict (汉城街道 (西安市)
- Weiyanghu Subdistrict (未央湖街道)

== Natural Geography ==
=== Climate ===
Weiyang District, together with the city of Xi'an, has a humid continental climate. The weather performances of the four seasons are distinct, and the annual rainfall intensity is moderate.

==== Seasons ====
In spring, the temperature rises rapidly but is often accompanied by fluctuation. From March to May, the average temperature usually climbs from 46 to 67 °F (8 to 19 °C). The rainfall in spring takes up 1/4 of the annual level. The summer here is hot with heavy rainfall. The average temperature ranges from 76.6 to 80.6 °F (24.8 to 27.0 °C). In an average of 22 days per year, the daily highest temperature is greater or equal to 95 °F (35 °C). Weather of extreme heat with over 104 °F (40 °C) exists every year. The rainfall in summer takes up around 37% of the annual level. Following summer, the temperature drops rapidly in autumn. The average temperature from September to November falls from 67.3 to 44.2 °F (19.6 to 6.8 °C). The rainfall in autumn takes up around 19% of the annual level. Autumn has the gentlest wind in the whole year. Winter weather is cold with little rain or snow. The average temperature in January drops to around 31 °F (−1 °C). The lowest temperature in winter could fall below 14 °F (−10 °C). Winter is dry with rainfall or snow taking up only 4% of the annual precipitation.

==== Wind ====
Winds in Weiyang District are mostly northeast winds, next southwest winds. The average wind speed is 6.56 ft/s (2.00 m/s).

=== Hydrology ===
Weiyang District has the largest water system and the biggest water area in Xi'an. All the rivers in Weiyang District are branches from the Yellow River. The Wei River (渭河) runs through the north of the district, the Ba River (灞河) runs through the east side, the Chan River (浐河) runs through the east, and the Zao River (皂河) runs through the west.

== Tourist Attractions ==
=== Historical Relics ===
==== Site of Epang Palace ====
The site of Epang Palace is ruins left from the very first power-centralized dynasty – the Qin dynasty. The Epang Palace, together with the Great Wall, the Mausoleum of the First Qin Emperor (the Terracotta Army), and the Expressway of Qin, is marked as "Qin Shi Huang's Four Major Projects". The building process of the palace was started in 212 B.C.. However, after five years of construction, the palace was left unfinished due to the sudden downfall of the Qin dynasty in 206 B.C.. This site was listed in the first batch of Chinese national key cultural relics protection sites in 1961 by the State Council of the People's Republic of China. According to archaeological researches, the palace had the length of around 4,167 feet (1,270 meters), the width of 1,398 feet (426 m), the height of 23–30 feet (7–9 m), and the area of 134.4 acres (544,000 m2). The ruins of the palace was deemed by UNESCO in 1992 to be ranked first in the world's palace buildings and belongs to the Wonders of the World. The ancient Chinese ode to the Epang Palace (阿房宫赋) also narrates the story of this historical relic.

==== Site of Daming Palace ====
The site of Daming Palace is mostly located in Weiyang district with a small part extending into the Xincheng District. It is the ruins of the largest palace in the capital city Chang'an of the Tang dynasty. According to archaeological researches, the palace had a trapezoidal flat plan: the east palace wall has 7,579 ft (2,310 m) in length, the west wall has 7,402 ft (2,256 m), the south wall has 5,492 ft (1,674 m), and the north wall has 3,724 ft (1,135 m). It was listed in the first batch of Chinese national key cultural relics protection sites in 1961 by the State Council of the People's Republic of China. The ruins was reconstructed into a National Heritage Park in 2010. At Jun 22nd, 2014, the site of Daming Palace was added into the World Heritage List.

==== Han Chang'an City Site ====
The site of Han dynasty's capital Chang'an is one of the Chinese ancient capital sites that has the largest size, the most complete preservation, the most abundant ruins, and significant historical importance. In 200 B.C., the Changle Palace finished reconstruction. In 199 B.C., the Weiyang Palace was built to its initial size. From 194 B.C. to 190 B.C., the city wall was constructed. The whole site has the area of 18,533 acres (75 square kilometers). It was listed among the first batch of Chinese national key cultural relics protection sites in 1961 by the State Council of the People's Republic of China.

==== The Site of Weiyang Palace ====
The site of Weiyang Palace of the Han dynasty was built around 200 B.C. It contains more than 40 halls and functioned as the administrative center in the later 11 dynasties after Han for more than 360 years. The Weiyang Palace has the longest existence among all the palaces in ancient Chinese history. The current ruins of the palace has the length of 1,148 ft (350 m), the width of 492 ft (150 m), the height of 49 ft (15 m), and the area of around 1,235 acres (5.00 square kilometers). It was listed among the first batch of Chinese national key cultural relics protection sites in 1961 and was included in the World Heritage List in 2014.

=== Museums ===
==== Han Chang'an City Relics Exhibition Museum ====
This exhibition hall is the first dedicated museum for the complete introduction of Han Chang'an City and its relics. It was first opened to publics at Jun 13th, 2009. After the reconstruction in 2013, it now has an area of 4,941 square feet (459.0 square meters). The 2 sub-exhibition halls in the museum are theme differently. The first hall introduces Chang'an City's historical evolution, layout scale, cultural style, and the current site's preservation status, archaeological achievements, and the remains from the Han dynasty. The second hall is dedicated to introduce the Silk Road since Chang'an was the starting point of the ancient Silk Road.

==== Other Museums ====
- Xi'an Meidu Museum: a private museum for the Shaanxi Province's central-collection and exhibition of the export porcelain and the enamel wares in the Ming and Qing dynasties.
- Yu Youren Calligraphy Art Museum: a folk museum for the collection and the exhibition of the calligraphy works by the artist Yu Youren.
- Xi'an Royal Art Museum: a large folk museum for the collection and the exhibition of the art treasures from the royal families of different dynasties.
- Xi'an Jingwen Ox Culture Ceramics Museum: the only ox-related museum in China. Collection includes different ox-related ceramics artworks from the 13 dynasties that have based their capitals at Xi'an.
- Snowflake Beer Museum: a corporation-funded museum dedicated to introduce the historical evolution of beer in China, the brewing technology development, and the beer appreciation methods.
- Xi'an Yaguan Porcelain Art Museum: a private museum dedicated to the exhibition and the study of the contemporary porcelain arts.

=== Scenic Sites and Parks ===
- Han City Lake National Water Conservancy Scenic Area
- Wiyang Lake Amusement Park
- Xi'an City Athletic Park
- Chan-Ba National Wetland Park
- Xi'an Wei River Ecological Landscape Scenic Area

== Transportation ==
=== Expressways ===
- Xibao Expressway (西宝高速)
- Xitong Expressway (西铜高速)
- Xiyan Expressway (西阎高速)
- Xitong Expressway (西潼高速)
- Xi'an City Ring Expressway (西安绕城高速)
- Airport Expressway Line 1 (机场高速一号线)
- Airport Expressway Line 2 (机场高速二号线)

=== Metro Lines ===
- Xi'an Metro Line 1
- Xi'an Metro Line 2
- Xi'an Metro Line 3
- Xi'an Metro Line 4

=== Airport ===
==== Xi'an Xianyang International Airport (XIY) ====
Weiyang District is only 8 kilometers away from Xi'an Xianyang International Airport. This airport is one of the eight largest regional hub airports in mainland China. The airport was officially competed and opened to traffic on September 1, 1991. On September 18, 2003, the second terminal (T2) was put into use. It was then the largest in scale and the most modernized airport in northwest China. On May 3, 2012, the third terminal (T3) was finished and opened to traffic. Meanwhile, after being used for 21 years, the oldest terminal (T1) was shut down.

=== Railroads ===
==== Xi'anbei Railway Station ====
Xi'anbei Railway Station is located inside Weiyang district, right on the northern central axis of the city of Xi'an. It is one of the main railway stations in Xi'an. It is also the largest and the most important railway passenger station in the railway network of northwest China. Xi'anbei Railway Station was put into use at January 11, 2011. The total area of the station is around 83.5 acres (338,000 square meters), and the highest point of the station measures 143 ft (44 m).
