= Lianhu, Xi'an =

Lianhu 莲湖区
- District
- Interactive map of Lianhu
- Coordinates: 34°15′57″N 108°54′13″E
- Country: People's Republic of China
- Province: Shaanxi
- Sub-provincial city: Xi'an

Area
  - Total: 38.32 km^{2} (14.80 sq mi)

Population (2020)
  - Total: 1,019,102
  - Density: 26,590/km^{2} (68,880/sq mi)
- Time zone: UTC+8 (China Standard)
- Postal code: 710082

Lianhu District (simplified Chinese: 莲湖区; traditional Chinese: 蓮湖區; pinyin: Liánhú Qū; lit. 'lotus lake') is one of 11 urban districts of the prefecture-level city of Xi'an, the capital of Shaanxi Province, Northwest China. The district is named after Lianhu Park, which is located within it. The district borders the districts of Weiyang to the north, Xincheng to the east, Beilin to the southeast, and Yanta to the southeast. It is divided into the following administrative divisions:

Number	Sub-District	Chinese	Pinyin
1	Beiyuanmen Sub-district	北院门街道	Běi Yuàn Mén
2	Qingnianlu Sub-district	青年路街道	Qīng Nián Lù
3	Zaoyuan Sub-district	枣园街道	Zǎo Yuán
4	Taoyuanlu Sub-district	桃园路街道	Táo Yuán Lù
5	Tumen Sub-district	土门街道	Tǔ Mén
6	Xiguan Sub-district	西关街道	Xī Guān
7	Huanchengxilu Sub-district	环城西路街道	Huán Chéng Xī Lù
8	Hongmiaopo Sub-district	红庙坡街道	Hóng Miào Pō
9	Beiguan Sub-district	北关街道	Běi Guān
