= Weixingcekongzhongxin station =

Metro station in Xi'an, China

Weixingcekongzhongxin 卫星测控中心
- Platform

Chinese name
- Traditional Chinese: 衛星測控中心
- Simplified Chinese: 卫星测控中心
- Literal meaning: Satellite control center
Transcriptions
Standard Mandarin
- Hanyu Pinyin: Wèixīng cèkòng zhōngxīn
- Wade–Giles: Wei^{4}-hsing^{1} ts‘ê^{4}-k‘ung^{4} chung^{1}-hsin^{1}
- IPA: [wêɪ.ɕíŋ tsʰɤ̂.kʰʊ̂ŋ ʈʂʊ́ŋ.ɕín]

General information
- Location: Xincheng District, Xi'an, Shaanxi; China
- Operator: Xi'an Metro Co. Ltd.
- Line: Line 6
- Platforms: 2 (1 island platform)

Construction
- Structure type: Underground

History
- Opened: 29 December 2022
- Former names: Dongshengbeilu (东盛北路)

Services
| Preceding station | Xi'an Metro | Following station |
|---|---|---|
| Wanshounanlu towards Xi'annanzhan | Line 6 | Tianjiawan towards Fangzhicheng |
Location

Weixingcekongzhongxin station (Chinese: 卫星测控中心站) is a station of Line 6 of the Xi'an Metro located in Xi'an's Xincheng District. It started operations on 29 December 2022.

== Station layout ==
| G | Exits | Exits A, B, D |
| L1; Concourse | Lobby | Customer service, ticket machines, ticket gates, Chang'an Card machines |
| L2; Platforms | arrow for L | 6 towards Xi'annanzhan (Wanshounanlu) |
| L2; Platforms | Island platform, doors open on the left |
| L2; Platforms | arrow for R | 6 towards Fangzhicheng (Tianjiawan) |

== Exits ==
| Designation | Nearby landmarks | Image |
|---|---|---|
| A | Xianning East Road (N) | |
| B | Xianning East Road (S), Zhixue Alley | |
| D | Fangzhicheng Main Street (E), Fang Sixth Road, Fangyuan Street | |
