= Fang 6-lu station =

Metro station in Xi'an, China

Fang 6-lu 纺六路
- Platform

Chinese name
- Traditional Chinese: 紡六路
- Simplified Chinese: 纺六路
- Literal meaning: Fang (Fangzhicheng) Sixth Road
Transcriptions
Standard Mandarin
- Hanyu Pinyin: Fǎng liù lù
- Wade–Giles: Fang^{3} liu^{4} lu^{4}
- IPA: [fàŋ ljôʊ lû]

General information
- Location: Baqiao District, Xi'an, Shaanxi; China
- Operator: Xi'an Metro Co. Ltd.
- Line: Line 6
- Platforms: 2 (1 island platform)

Construction
- Structure type: Underground

History
- Opened: 29 December 2022
- Former names: Fang 5-lu (纺五路)

Services
Preceding station	Xi'an Metro	Following station
Mujiangwang towards Xi'annanzhan	Line 6	Fang 2-lu towards Fangzhicheng
Location

Fang 6-lu station (Chinese: 纺六路站) is a station of Line 6 of the Xi'an Metro located in Xi'an's Baqiao District. It started operations on 29 December 2022.

== Station layout ==
G	Exits	Exits A, C, D
L1; Concourse	Lobby	Customer service, ticket machines, ticket gates, Chang'an Card machines
L2; Platforms	arrow for L	6 towards Xi'annanzhan (Mujiangwang)
L2; Platforms	Island platform, doors open on the left
L2; Platforms	arrow for R	6 towards Fangzhicheng (Fang 2-lu)

== Exits ==
Designation	Nearby landmarks	Image
A	Fangzhicheng Main Street (W), Fang Sixth Road, Fangzhicheng West Street	
C	Fangzhicheng Main Street (E), Fang Seventh Road, Fang Eighth Road	
D	Fangzhicheng Main Street (E), Fang Sixth Road, Fangyuan Street	
