= Xi'anguojiyixuezhongxin station =

Metro station in Xi'an, China

Xi'anguojiyixuezhongxin 西安国际医学中心
- Platform

Chinese name
- Traditional Chinese: 西安國際醫學中心
- Simplified Chinese: 西安国际医学中心
- Literal meaning: Xi'an International Medical Center
Transcriptions
Standard Mandarin
- Hanyu Pinyin: Xī'ān guójì yīxué zhōngxīn
- Wade–Giles: Hsi^{1}-an^{1} kuo^{2}-chi^{4} i^{1}-hsüeh^{2} chung^{1}-hsin
- IPA: [ɕí.án kwǒ.tɕî í.ɕɥě ʈʂʊ́ŋ ɕín]

General information
- Location: Chang'an District, Xi'an, Shaanxi; China
- Operator: Xi'an Metro Co. Ltd.
- Line: Line 6
- Platforms: 2 (1 island platform)

Construction
- Structure type: Underground

History
- Opened: 28 December 2020
- Former names: Wei 32 (纬三十二)

Services
Preceding station	Xi'an Metro	Following station
Xidiankedananxiaoqu · Weilaizhitong towards Xi'annanzhan	Line 6	Rencun towards Fangzhicheng
Location

Xi'anguojiyixuezhongxin station (Chinese: 西安国际医学中心站) is a station of Line 6 of the Xi'an Metro located in Xi'an's Chang'an District. It started operations on 28 December 2020.

== Station layout ==
G	Exits	Exits A–D
L1; Concourse	Lobby	Customer service, ticket machines, ticket gates, Chang'an Card machines
L2; Platforms	arrow for L	6 towards Xi'annanzhan (Xidiankedananxiaoqu · Weilaizhitong)
L2; Platforms	Island platform, doors open on the left
L2; Platforms	arrow for R	6 towards Fangzhicheng (Rencun)

== Exits ==
The station has four exits. Exit C is fitted with a passageway connecting to Xi'an International Medical Center.

Exit C passageway to Xi'an International Medical Center (May 2022)

Designation	Nearby landmarks	Image
A	Xitai Road (W)	
B	Xitai Road (W)	
C	Xitai Road (E), Xi'an International Medical Center	
D	Xitai Road (E)	
