= Zhonglou station =

Metro station in Xi'an, China

Coordinates: 34.2623°N 108.9423°E

Zhonglou 钟楼
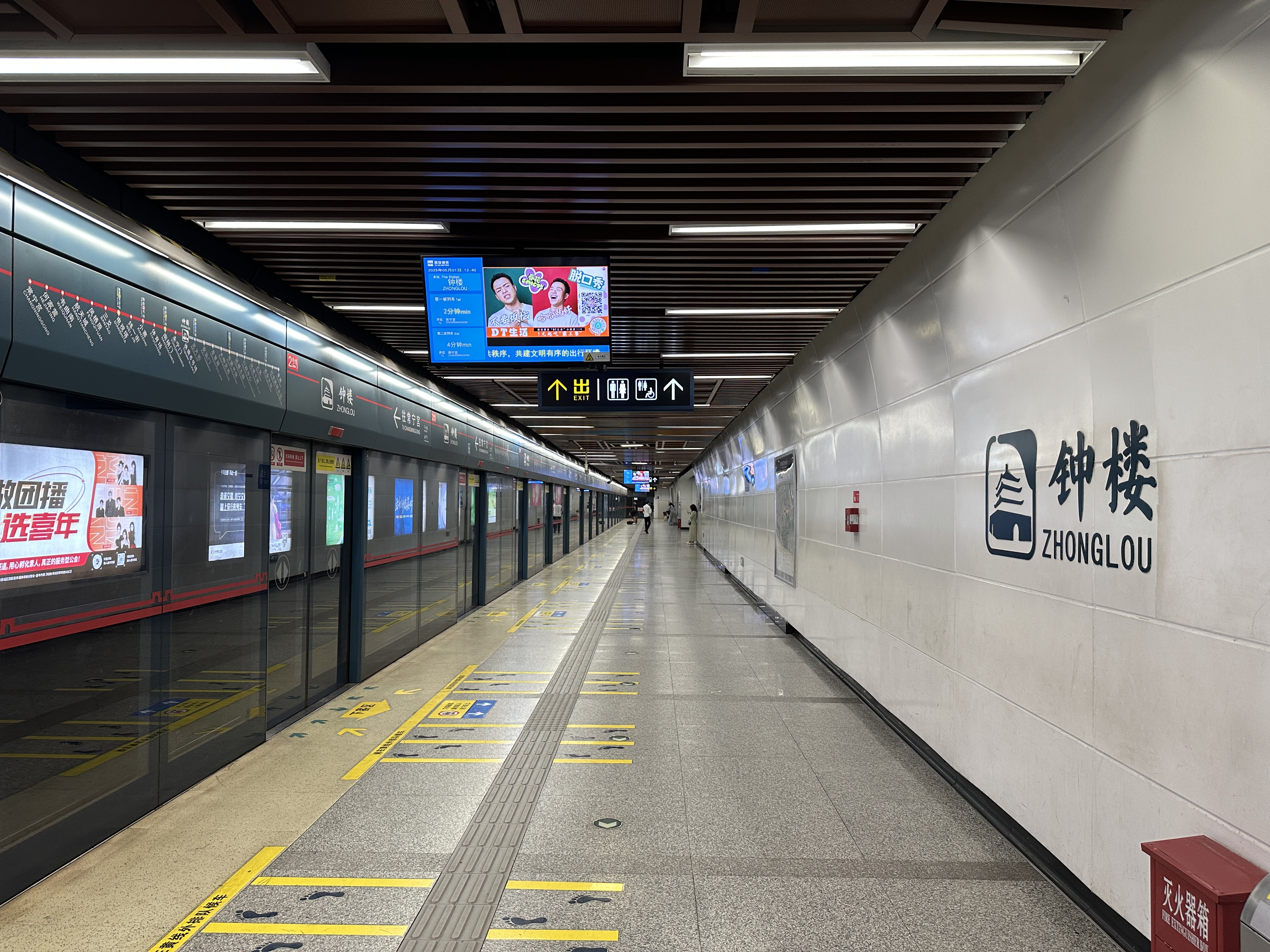
- Line 2 platform

Chinese name
- Traditional Chinese: 鐘樓
- Simplified Chinese: 钟楼
- Literal meaning: Bell Tower
Transcriptions
Standard Mandarin
- Hanyu Pinyin: Zhōnglóu
- Wade–Giles: Chung^{1}-lou^{2}
- IPA: [ʈʂʊ́ŋ.lǒʊ]

General information
- Location: Beilin District, Xi'an, Shaanxi; China
- Operator: Xi'an Metro Co. Ltd.
- Lines: Line 2 Line 6
- Platforms: 4 (2 island platforms)

Construction
- Structure type: Underground

History
- Opened: 16 September 2011 (Line 2); 29 December 2022 (Line 6)

Services
Preceding station	Xi'an Metro	Following station
Beidajie towards Caotan	Line 2	Yongningmen towards Changninggong
Guangjijie towards Xi'annanzhan	Line 6	Dachaishi towards Fangzhicheng
Location

Zhonglou station (Chinese: 钟楼站; lit. 'Bell Tower station') is a station of Lines 2 and 6 of the Xi'an Metro. It started operations on 16 September 2011.

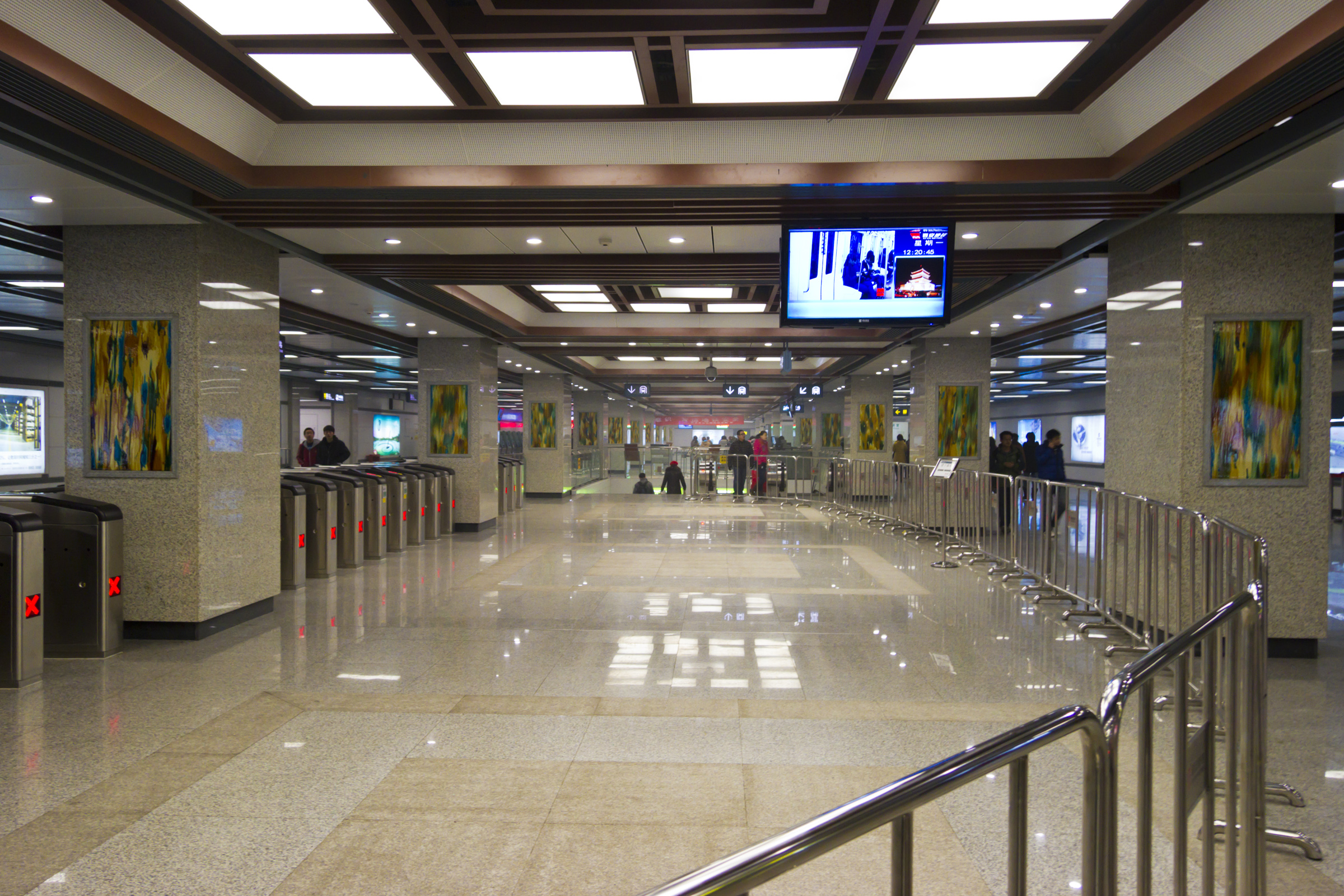
Station hall

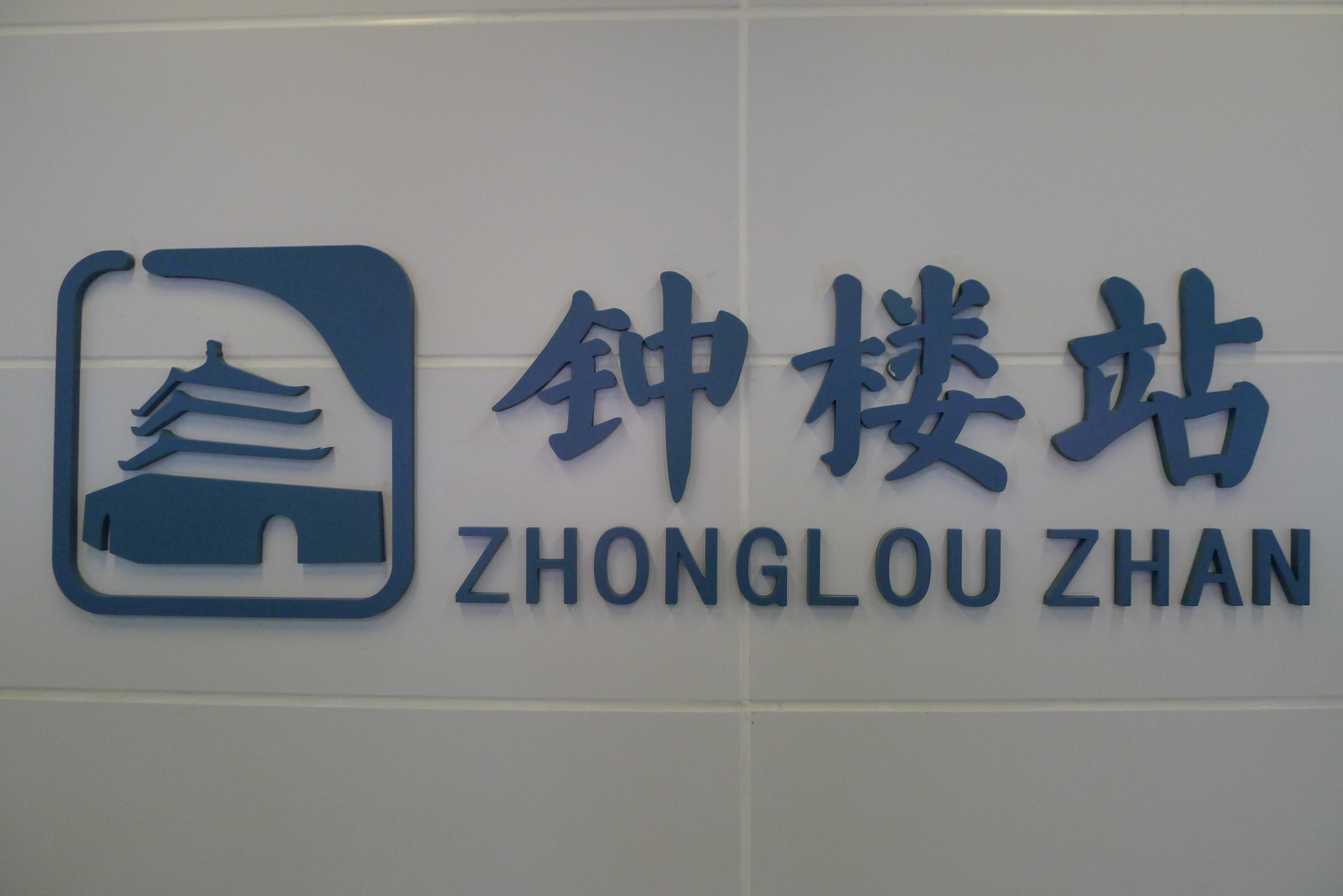
Station sign
