= Zaozitai station =

Metro station in Xi'an, China

Zaozitai 造字台
- Platform

Chinese name
- Chinese: 造字台
Transcriptions
Standard Mandarin
- Hanyu Pinyin: Zàozìtái
- Wade–Giles: Tsao^{4}-tzŭ^{4}-t‘ai^{2}
- IPA: [tsâʊ.tsɨ̂.tʰǎɪ]

General information
- Location: Chang'an District, Xi'an, Shaanxi; China
- Operator: Xi'an Metro Co. Ltd.
- Line: Line 6
- Platforms: 2 (1 island platform)

Construction
- Structure type: Underground

History
- Opened: 28 December 2020
- Former names: Jinye 2-lu (锦业二路)

Services
Preceding station	Xi'an Metro	Following station
Xibudadao (Xitailukou) towards Xi'annanzhan	Line 6	Zhangba 6-lu towards Fangzhicheng
Location

Zaozitai station (Chinese: 造字台站) is a station of Line 6 of the Xi'an Metro located in Xi'an's Chang'an District. It started operations on 28 December 2020.

== Station layout ==
G	Exits	Exits B–D
L1; Concourse	Lobby	Customer service, ticket machines, ticket gates, Chang'an Card machines
L2; Platforms	arrow for L	6 towards Xi'annanzhan (Xibudadao (Xitailukou))
L2; Platforms	Island platform, doors open on the left
L2; Platforms	arrow for R	6 towards Fangzhicheng (Zhangba 6-lu)

== Exits ==
Designation	Nearby landmarks	Image
B	Xitai Road (W)	
C	Jinye Third Road, Xitai Road (E)	
D	Jinye Second Road, Xitai Road (E)	
