= Laboratorio museotecnico Goppion =

Manufacturer of display systems for museums

Laboratorio museotecnico Goppion, founded in 1952, is a manufacturer of display systems for museums. It is a centre for research into technical questions related to the museum world (engineering and techniques for the protection and the preservation of works of art and the most suitable method by which they may be displayed) as well as the subjects of museography and museology.

The Laboratorio museotecnico Goppion has made the cases for the Mona Lisa at the Louvre, the Crown Jewels in London, and the Multiversity Galleries of Museum of Anthropology at UBC in Vancouver.

Indeed, the Annali have been published by the company with contributions from curators, museum directors, cultural superintendents and designers. Study days have been organised in collaboration with the Scuola Normale Superiore di Pisa and the Ministry for the Arts and Cultural Heritage. Laboratorio museotecnico Goppion headquarters is in Trezzano sul Naviglio Milan.

== Exhibits ==
Major exhibits created:

- Jewel House, London (1994)
- Wellcome Trust Gallery at the British Museum, London (2003)
- Shrine of the Book at the Israel Museum, Jerusalem (2004)
- Musée des Arts Decoratifs, Paris (2006)
- Jameel Gallery of Islamic Art at the Victoria & Albert Museum, London (2006)
- Egyptian Galleries at the Fitzwilliam Museum, Cambridge (2006)
- Musée Depertemental del la Ceramique, Lezoux (2006)
- Ceramic Gallery at the Nelson Atkins Museum of Art, Kansas City (2007)
- African Gallery at the Nelson Atkins Museum of Art, Kansas City (2008)
- Newseum, Washington (2008)
- Museo Diocesano di Bitonto (2008)
- Museo Diocesano di Molfetta (2008)
- Sezione di Arte Cinese at the Museo di Arte Orientale, Turin (2008)
- Museo Diocesano di Taranto (2008)
- Watches and Clock Gallery at the British Museum, London (2008)
- American Indian Gallery at the Nelson Atkins Museum of Art, Kansas City (2009)
- Museo Diocesano di Savona (2009)
- Walt Disney Family Museum, San Francisco (2009)
- Musée de l’Armée, Paris (2009)
- Musée du Louvre - Galerie de la Venus de Milo et de la Melpomene (2009-2010)

Major exhibits in progress:

- Museum of Islamic Art, Cairo
- Israel Museum, Jerusalem - Bronfman Archaeology Wing
- Museum of Fine Arts, Boston - American Wing
- Museum of Fine Arts, Boston - "Greek Sculpture Gallery"
- Museum of Fine Arts, Boston - "Renaissance Gallery"
- Shaanxi History Museum, Xi'An - Tang Dynasty Mural Painting Exhibition Hall
- Smithsonian Institution, U.S. - American Indian Gallery
