= Xidiankedananxiaoqu · Weilaizhitong station =

Metro station in Xi'an, China

Xidiankedananxiaoqu · Weilaizhitong 西电科大南校区·未来之瞳
- Platform

Chinese name
- Traditional Chinese: 西電科大南校區·未來之瞳
- Simplified Chinese: 西电科大南校区·未来之瞳
- Literal meaning: Xidian University South Campus · Future Eye
Transcriptions
Standard Mandarin
- Hanyu Pinyin: Xīdiàn kēdà nán xiàoqū · Wèilái zhī tǒng
- Wade–Giles: Hsi^{1}-tien^{4} k‘o^{1}-ta^{4} nan^{2} hsiao^{4}-chü^{1} · Wei^{4}-lai^{2} chih^{1} t‘ung^{3}
- IPA: [ɕí.tjɛ̂n kʰɤ́.tâ nǎn ɕjâʊ.tɕʰý wêɪ.lǎɪ ʈʂɨ́ tʰ]

General information
- Location: Chang'an District, Xi'an, Shaanxi; China
- Operator: Xi'an Metro Co. Ltd.
- Line: Line 6
- Platforms: 2 (1 island platform)

Construction
- Structure type: Underground

History
- Opened: 26 September 2024
- Former names: Cepo (側坡)

Services
Preceding station	Xi'an Metro	Following station
Xi'annanzhan Terminus	Line 6	Xi'anguojiyixuezhongxin towards Fangzhicheng
Location

Xidiankedananxiaoqu · Weilaizhitong station (Chinese: 西电科大南校区·未来之瞳站) is a station of Line 6 of the Xi'an Metro located in Xi'an's Chang'an District. It started operations on 26 September 2024.

== Station layout ==
G	Exits	Exits A–D
L1; Concourse	Lobby	Customer service, ticket machines, ticket gates, Chang'an Card machines
L2; Platforms	arrow for L	6 towards Xi'annanzhan (terminus)
L2; Platforms	Island platform, doors open on the left
L2; Platforms	arrow for R	6 towards Fangzhicheng (Xi'anguojiyixuezhongxin)

== Exits ==
Designation	Nearby landmarks	Image
A	Xitai Road (W), Chengzhang Road (N)	
B	Xitai Road (W), Chengzhang Road (S)	
C	Xitai Road (E), Xidian University Chang'an Campus, Leigan Road (S)	
D	Xitai Road (E), Leigan Road (N)	
