= Hsinchu station =

Hsinchu station (Chinese: 新竹車站; pinyin: Xīnzhú chēzhàn) may refer to the following stations in Hsinchu or Hsinchu County, Taiwan:

- Hsinchu HSR station, a Taiwan High Speed Rail station in Zhubei, opened in 2006
- Hsinchu railway station, a TRA station on the West Coast and Neiwan lines in East District, opened in 1893

== See also ==
- Xinzhu station, a metro station on Line 3 of the Xi'an Metro
