= Fang 2-lu station =

Metro station in Xi'an, China

Fang 2-lu 纺二路
- Platform

Chinese name
- Traditional Chinese: 紡二路
- Simplified Chinese: 纺二路
- Literal meaning: Fang (Fangzhicheng) Second Road
Transcriptions
Standard Mandarin
- Hanyu Pinyin: Fǎng-èr-lù
- Wade–Giles: Fang^{3}-êrh^{4}-lu^{4}
- IPA: [fàŋ.âɚ.lû]

General information
- Location: Baqiao District, Xi'an, Shaanxi; China
- Operator: Xi'an Metro Co. Ltd.
- Line: Line 6
- Platforms: 2 (1 island platform)

Construction
- Structure type: Underground

History
- Opened: 29 December 2022

Services
| Preceding station | Xi'an Metro | Following station |
|---|---|---|
| Fang 6-lu towards Xi'annanzhan | Line 6 | Fangzhicheng Terminus |
Location

Fang 2-lu station (Chinese: 纺二路站) is a station of Line 6 of the Xi'an Metro located in Xi'an's Baqiao District. It started operations on 29 December 2022.

== Station layout ==
| G | Exits | Exits B, D |
| L1; Concourse | Lobby | Customer service, ticket machines, ticket gates, Chang'an Card machines |
| L2; Platforms | arrow for L | 6 towards Xi'annanzhan (Fang 6-lu) |
| L2; Platforms | Island platform, doors open on the left |
| L2; Platforms | arrow for R | 6 towards Fangzhicheng (terminus) |

== Exits ==
| Designation | Nearby landmarks | Image |
|---|---|---|
| B | Fangzhicheng Main Street (W), Fang Third Road | |
| D | Fang Second Road, Fangzhicheng Main Street (E), Fang First Road, Fangzhicheng East Street | |
