= Yinqiaodadao station =

Metro station in Xi'an, China

Yinqiaodadao 银桥大道
- Platform

Chinese name
- Traditional Chinese: 銀橋大道
- Simplified Chinese: 银桥大道
- Literal meaning: Yinqiao Avenue
Transcriptions
Standard Mandarin
- Hanyu Pinyin: Yínqiáo dàdào
- Wade–Giles: In^{2}-ch‘iao^{2} ta^{4}-tao^{4}
- IPA: [ǐn.tɕʰjǎʊ tâ tâʊ]

General information
- Location: Lintong District, Xi'an, Shaanxi; China
- Operator: Xi'an Metro Co. Ltd.
- Line: Line 9
- Platforms: 2 (1 island platform)

Construction
- Structure type: Underground

History
- Opened: 28 December 2020
- Former names: Bei'erhuan (北二环)

Services
Preceding station	Xi'an Metro	Following station
Dongsancha towards Fangzhicheng	Line 9	Qinlingxi Terminus
Location

Yinqiaodadao station (Chinese: 银桥大道站) is a station of Line 9 of the Xi'an Metro located in Xi'an's Lintong District. It started operations on 28 December 2020.

== Station layout ==
G	Exits	Exits B–D
L1; Concourse	Lobby	Customer service, ticket machines, ticket gates, Chang'an Card machines
L2; Platforms	arrow for L	9 towards Fangzhicheng (Dongsancha)
L2; Platforms	Island platform, doors open on the left
L2; Platforms	arrow for R	9 towards Qinlingxi (terminus)

== Exits ==
Designation	Nearby landmarks	Image
B	Yinqiao Avenue (W), Taoyuan North Road, Lintong District Government Affairs Service Center	
C	Yinqiao Avenue (E), Tiyu Road (S)	
D	Yinqiao Avenue (E), Tiyu Road (E), Lintong Sports Center	

== Gallery ==
Concourse, 2023
