= Shaanxi History Museum =

Museum in Xi'an, China

Shaanxi History Museum 陕西历史博物馆
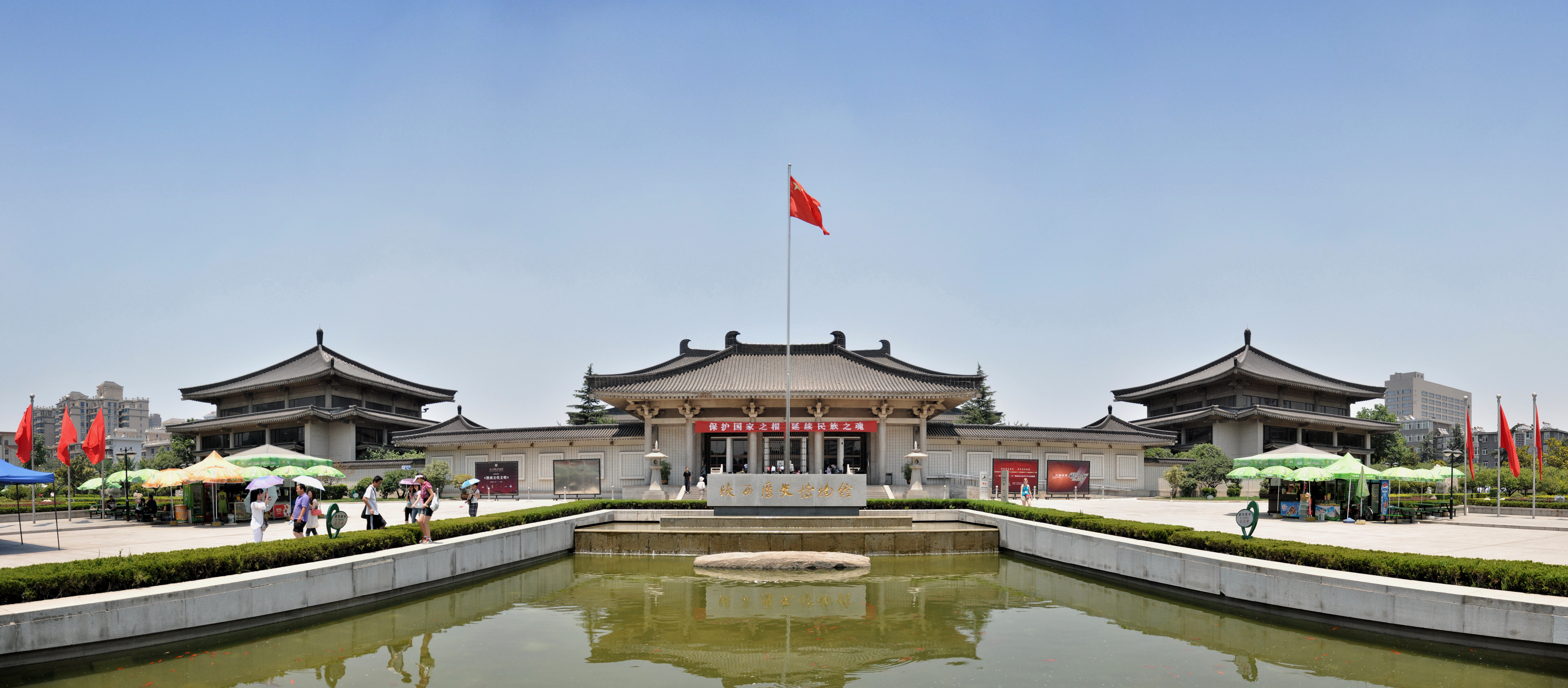
- Established: 20 June 1991
- Location: Xi'an, Shaanxi, China
- Coordinates: 34°13′31″N 108°57′05″E
- Collection size: 1,725,754 objects or sets (2021)
- Visitors: 2,713,465 (2017)
- Director: Pang Yani (庞雅妮)
- Public transit access: Xiaozhai station 2 3 Dayanta station 3 4
- Website: www.sxhm.com (in Chinese) www.sxhm.com/en/index.html (English)

Shaanxi History Museum, which is located to the northwest of the Giant Wild Goose Pagoda in the ancient city Xi'an, in the Shaanxi province of China, is one of the first huge state museums with modern facilities in China and one of the largest. The museum houses 1,725,754 objects or sets (2021), including murals, paintings, pottery, coins, as well as bronze, gold, and silver objects. Planning for the modern museum began in 1983, and it was completed and opened on 20 June 1991. Its appearance recalls the architectural style of the Tang dynasty.

== History ==
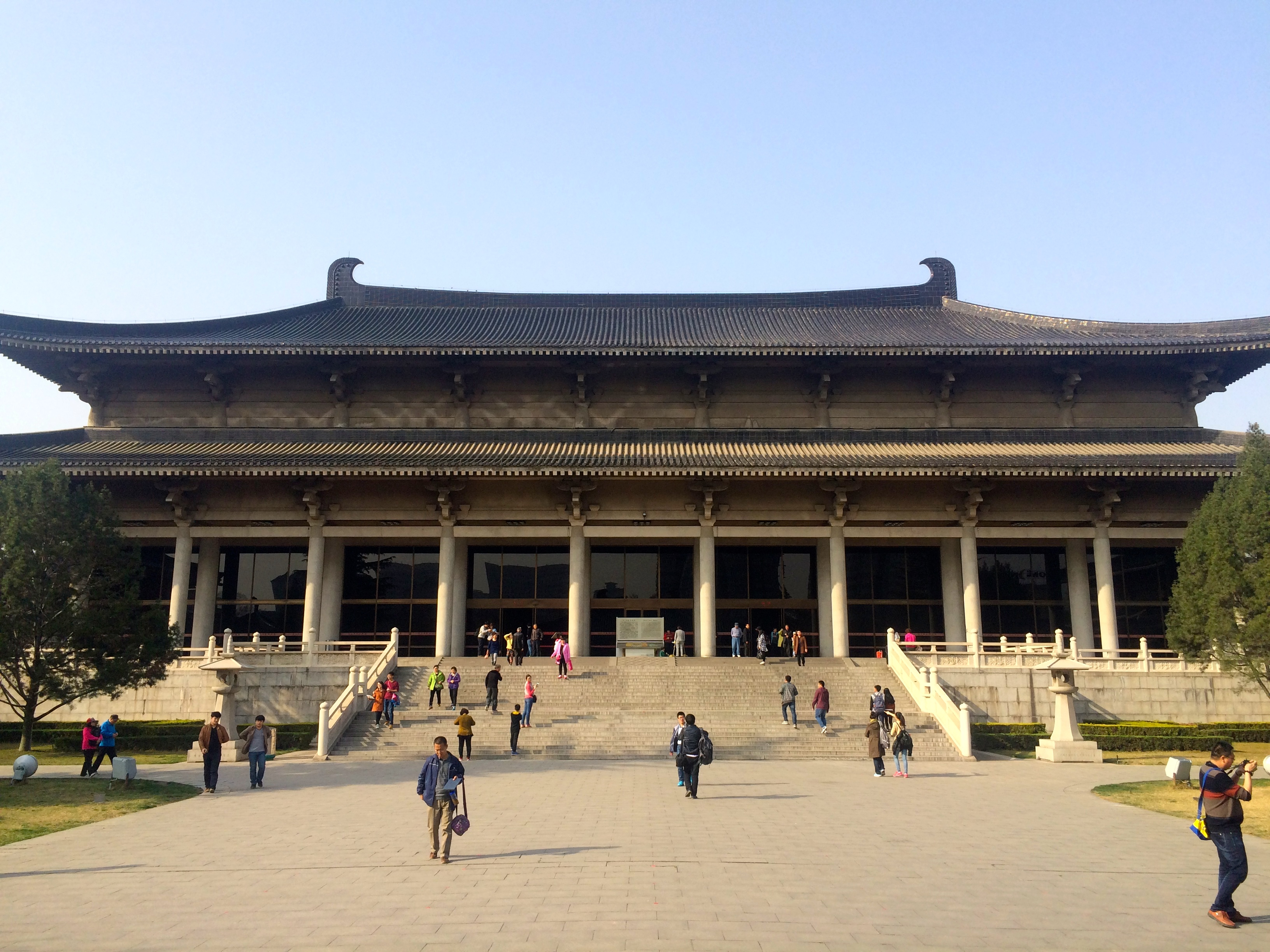
Main exhibition hall of the museum

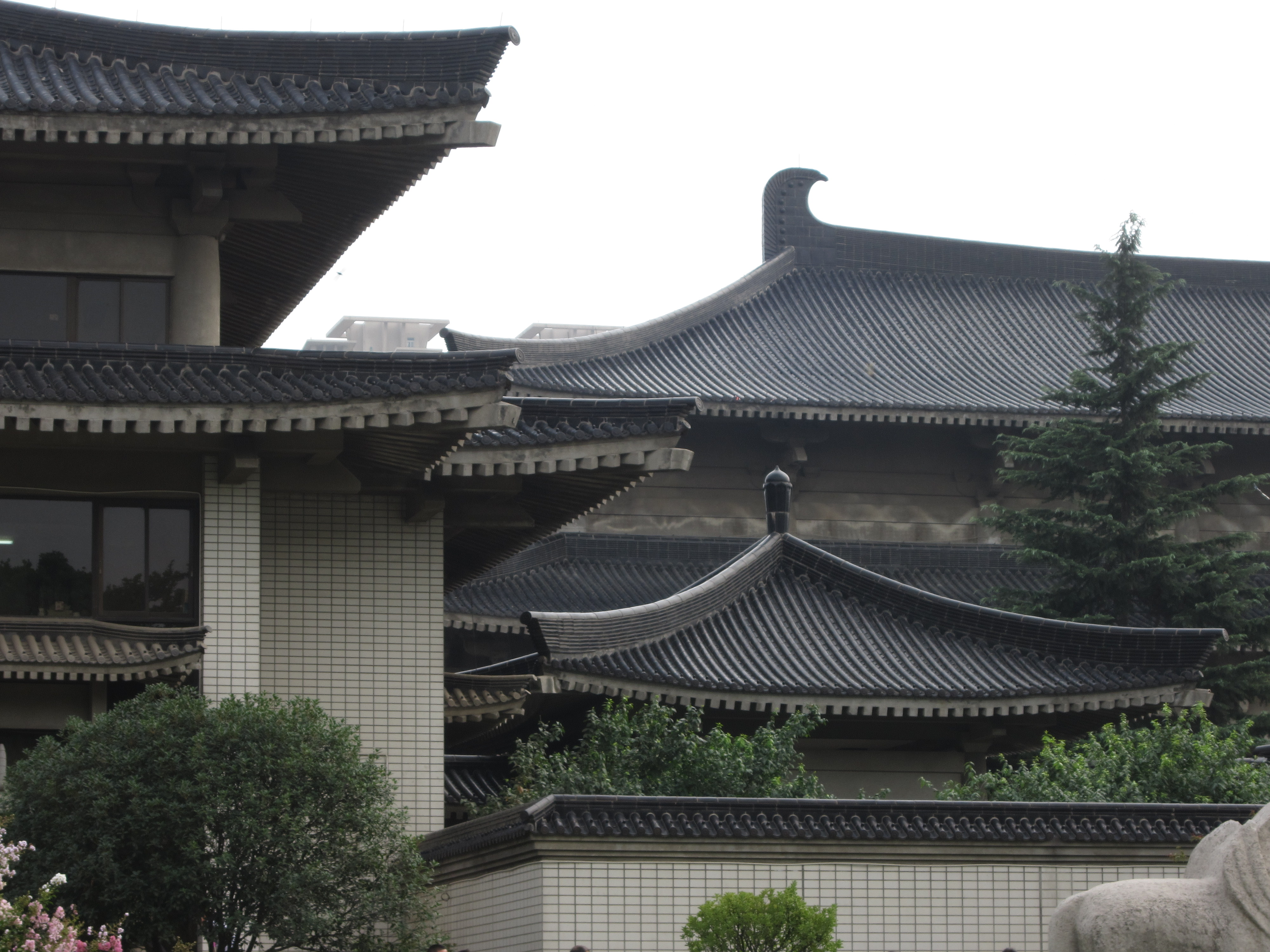
Detail of the museum's architecture

Shaanxi History Museum was constructed from 1983. It was opened to the public on 20 June 1991. The museum is in an area of 65,000 square metres (700,000 sq ft), with a building area of 55,600 square metres (598,000 sq ft), cultural relics storerooms of 8,000 square metres (86,000 sq ft), exhibition halls of 11,000 square meters, and a collection of 1,725,754 objects or sets as of 2021. The museum is architecturally in the Tang style, with a "hall in center, storied buildings in corners". It is elegant and dignified, on a large scale, with a combination of traditional architecture and modern technology, which embodies folk tradition and local features.

Shaanxi was the ancient imperial capital of China, having been the seat of more than 13 feudal dynasties, including the Zhou, Qin, Han, and Tang dynasties. The province is rich in cultural relics. With the completion of the Shaanxi History Museum, it collected over 370,000 precious relics which were unearthed in Shaanxi Province, including bronze wares, pottery figures, and mural paintings in Tang tombs. In particular there are large numbers of pottery Tang dynasty tomb figures from the tombs of the imperial family around the city.

Since the opening of the museum, it has followed the policy of collecting, conservation, publicizing, education, and scientific research, using its many historical relics, and conducted various types of display. The relics have also been exhibited overseas in cities in Japan, France, the United States, the United Kingdom and Germany.

== Collection highlights ==
Highlights of the museum include:

- Fossils of the Lantian Man (preceded Peking Man),
- The Deer Pattern Eaves Tile from the Qin dynasty,
- The many objects from the Tang Hejia Village hoard, found in 1970, deposited around 755 during the An Lushan Rebellion.
- The Kneeling Archer, a 120 cm (47 in) tall figure unearthed in 1977 from Emperor Qin Shi Huang's tomb
- The Four Footed Li, a Shang dynasty bronze cooking utensil,
- Playing Polo, a Tang dynasty mural of people playing polo in China,
- Frescos and pottery tomb figures from the tomb of Princess Li Xianhui, 705, Tang dynasty
- The Empress's Seal, a jade seal from the Western Han dynasty, excavated near the tomb of Emperor Gao Zu, the first emperor of the Han dynasty – one of the most important imperial seals ever found in China.

== Gallery ==
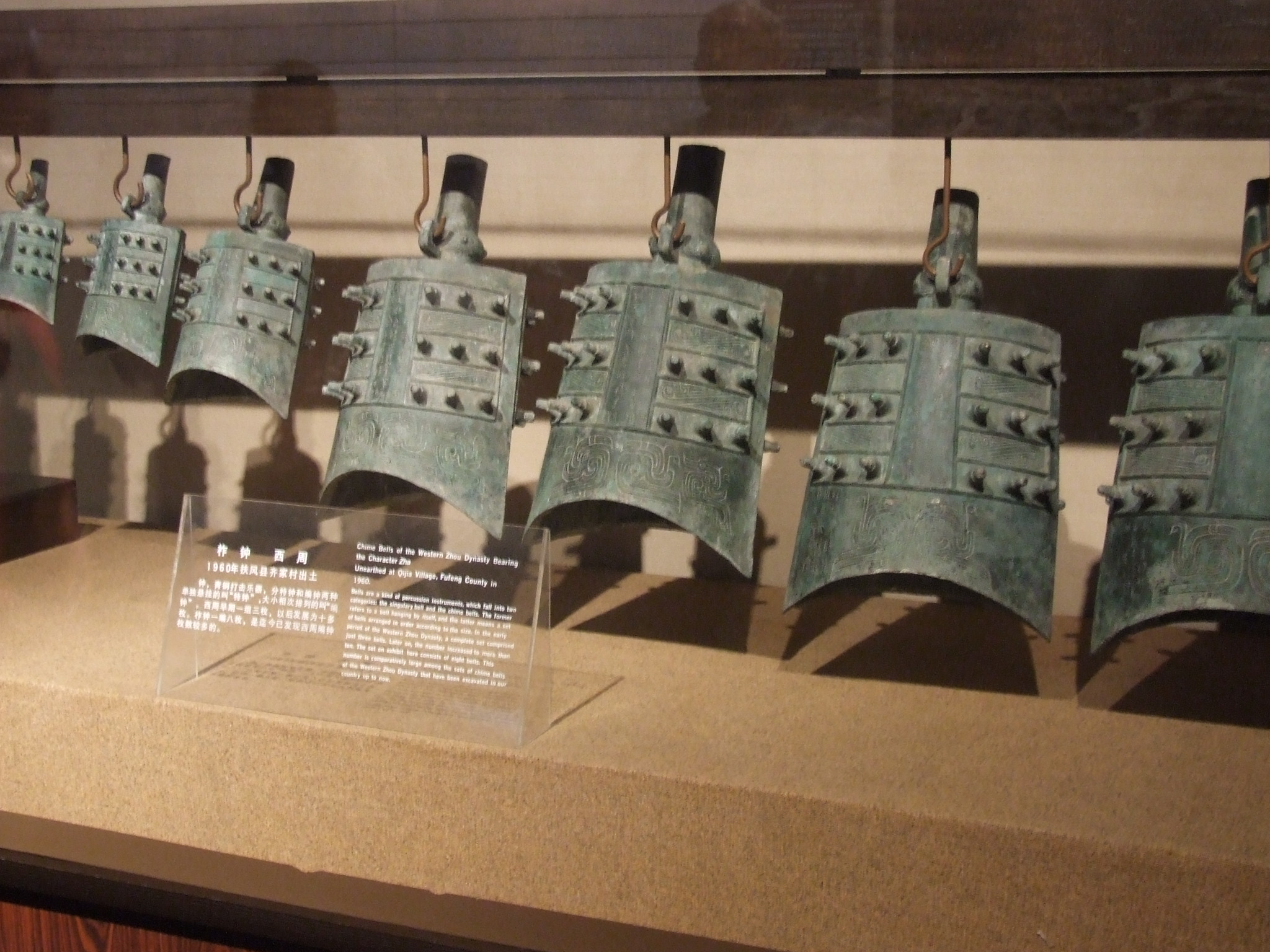
Zhou dynasty gold Bianzhong

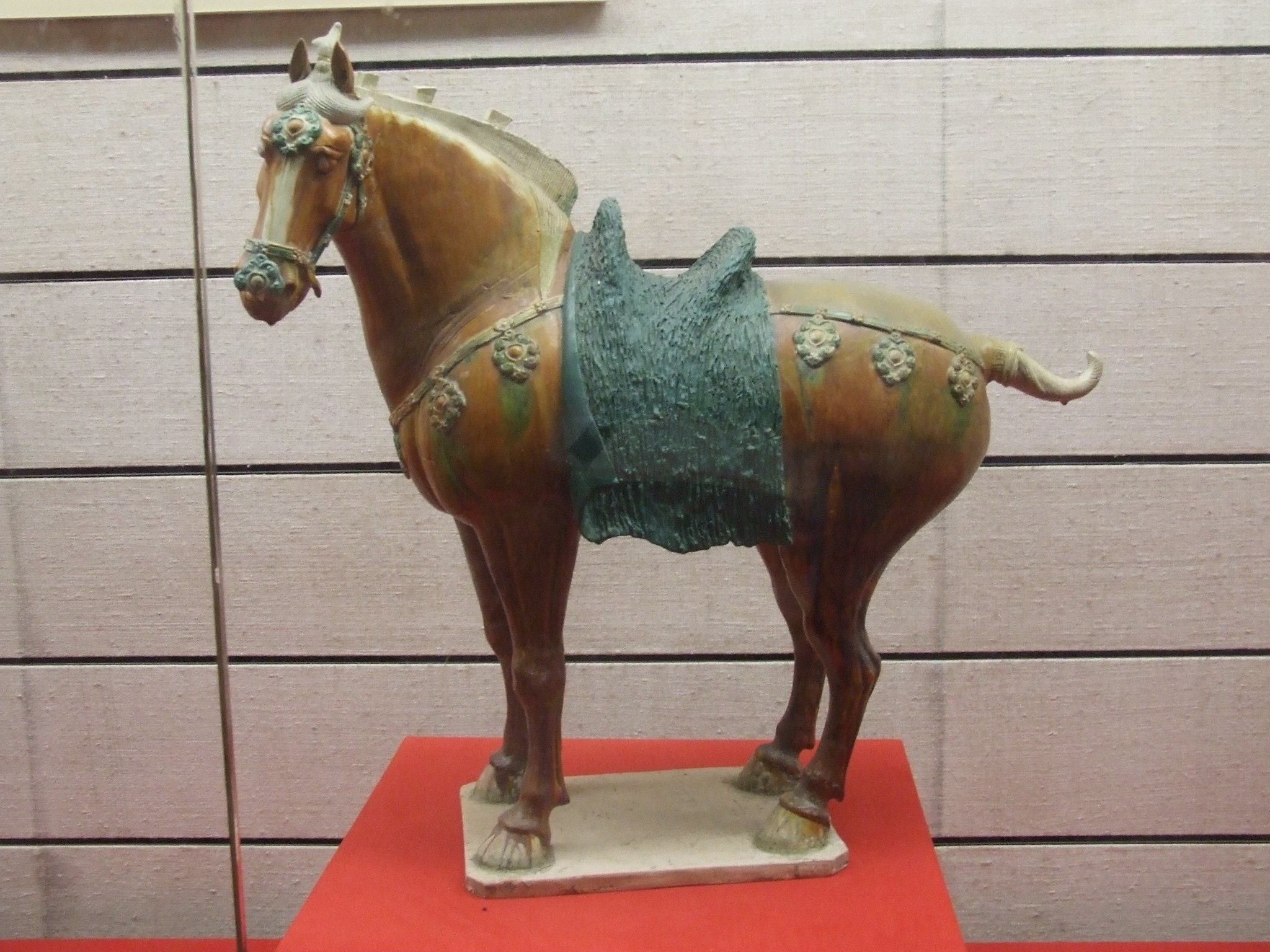
Ceramic tomb figure of a horse in sancai glaze

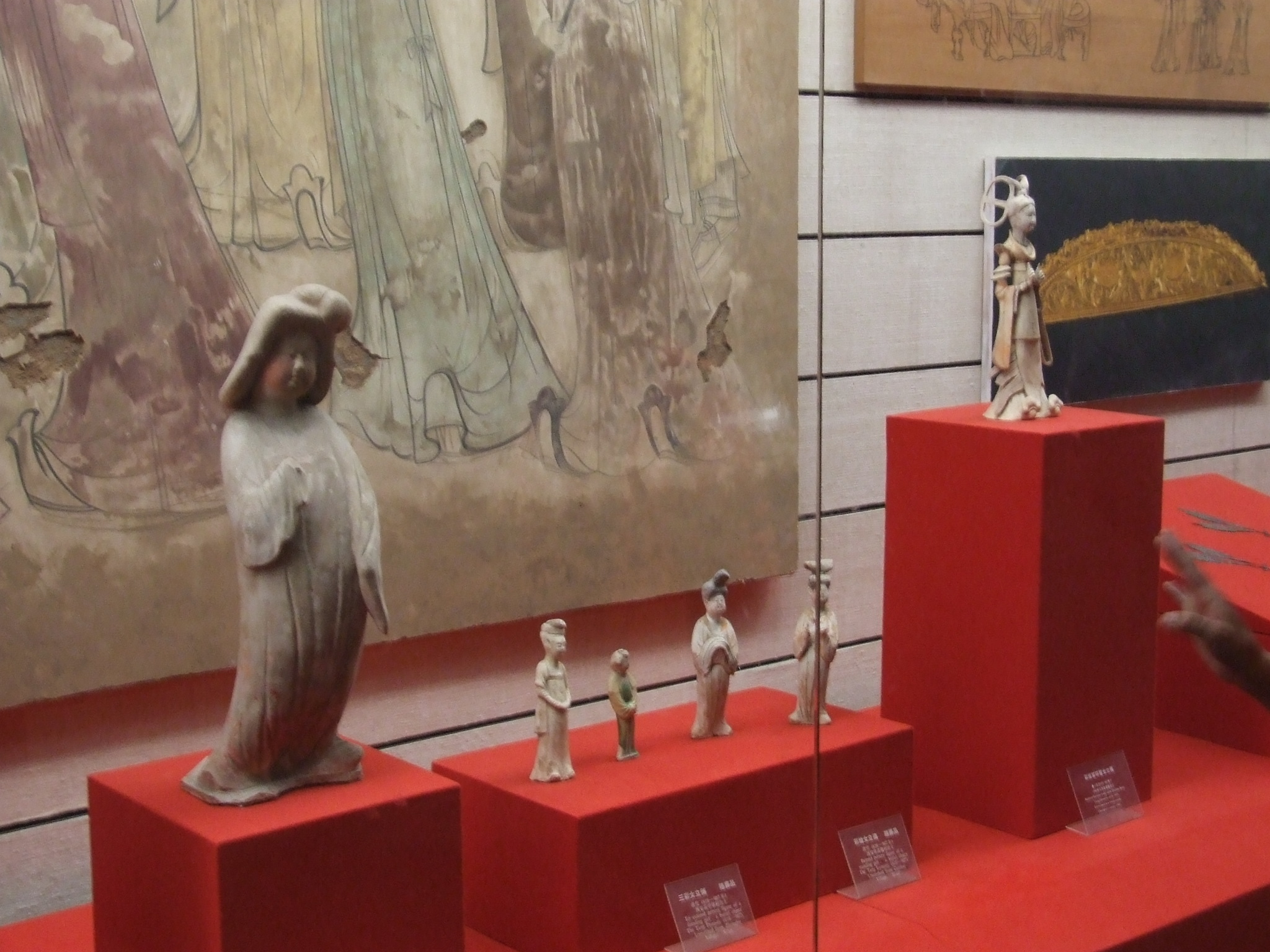
Tomb figures of ladies

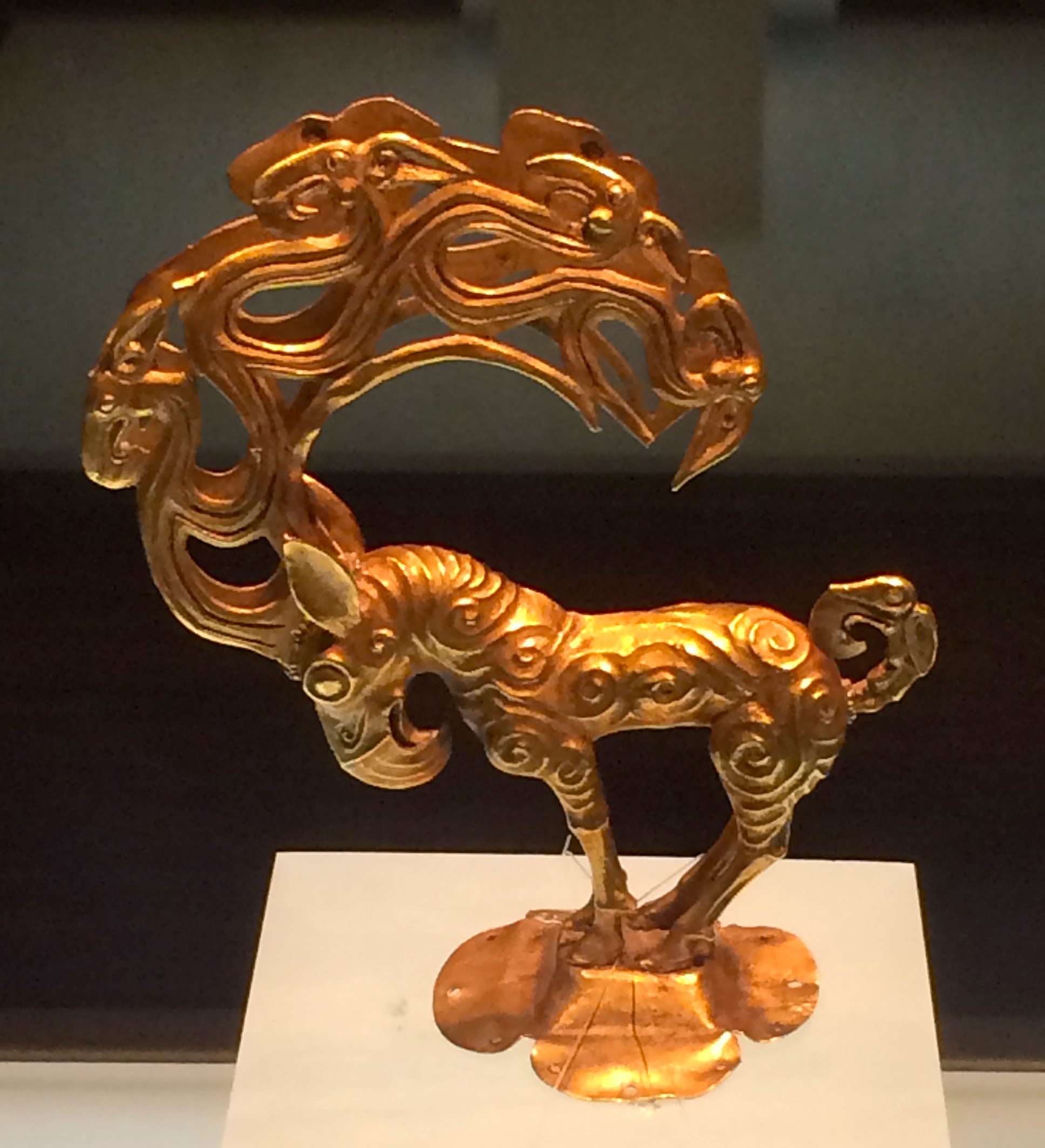
Gold stag with eagle's head and ten more heads in the antlers. Object inspired by Siberian Altai art. Nalinggaotu site, Shenmu County, near Xi'an.

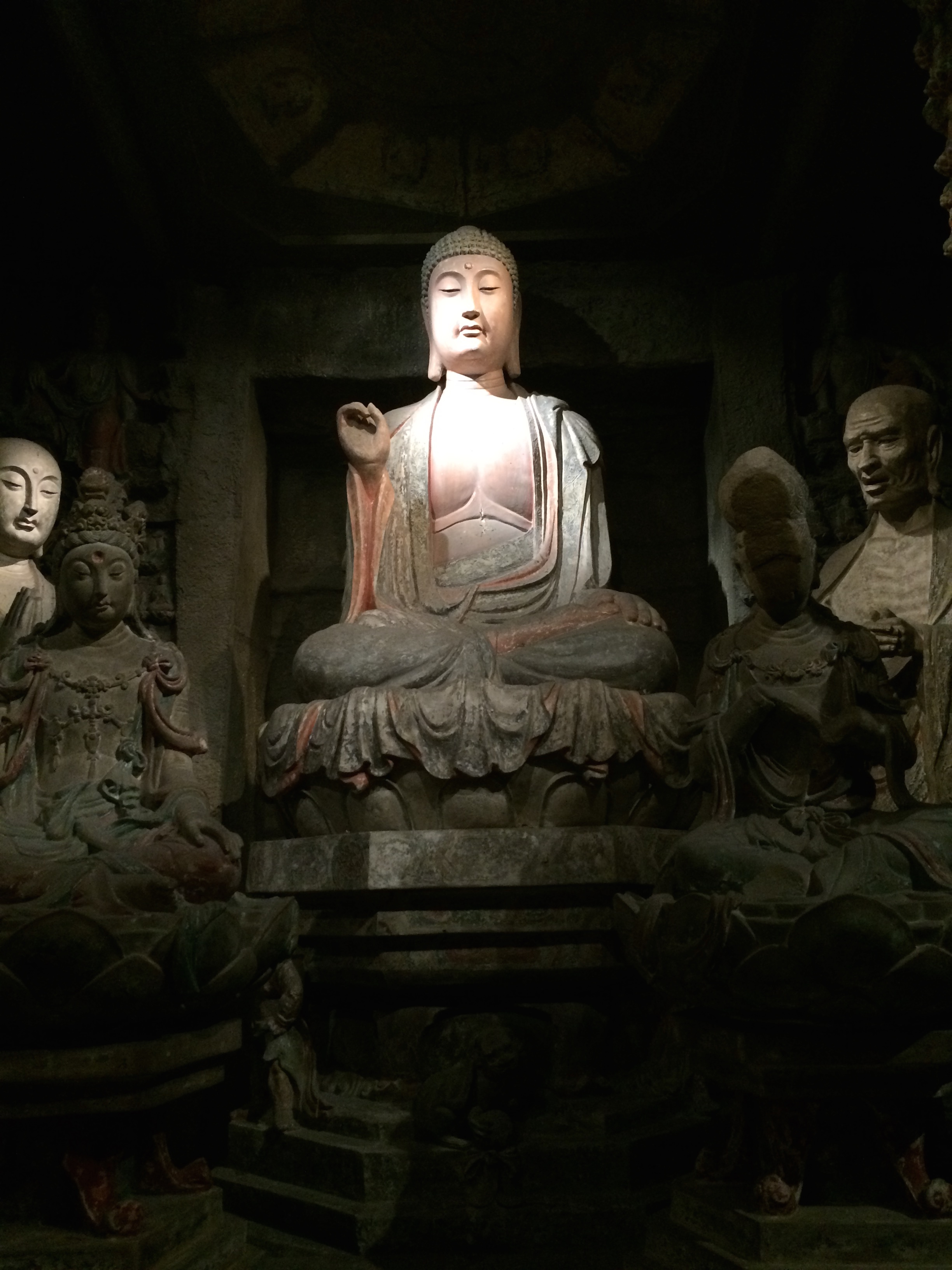
Statues from Zhongshan Grottoes (钟山石窟)

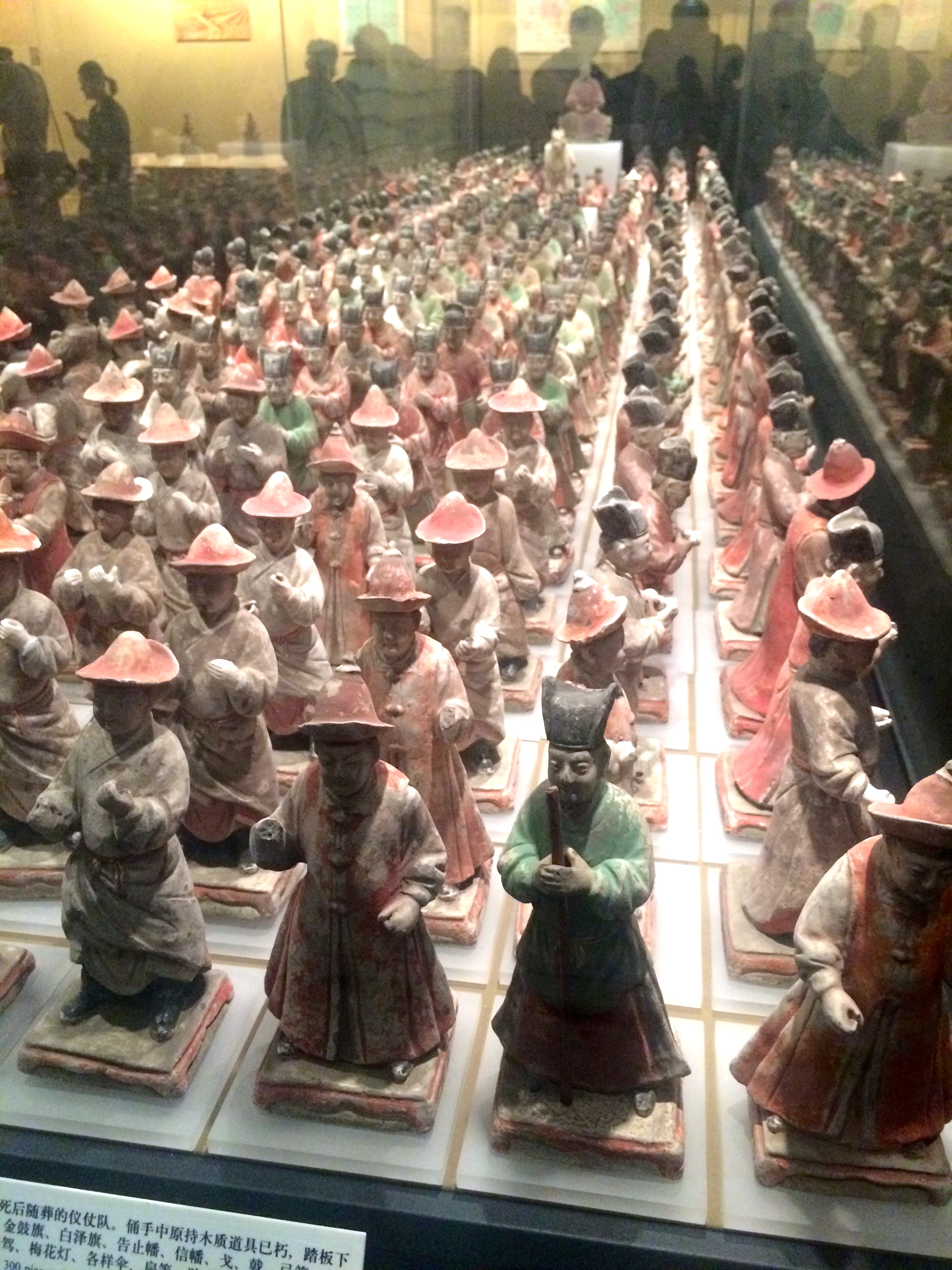
Painted tomb figures of guardians of Prince Qinjian from the Ming dynasty

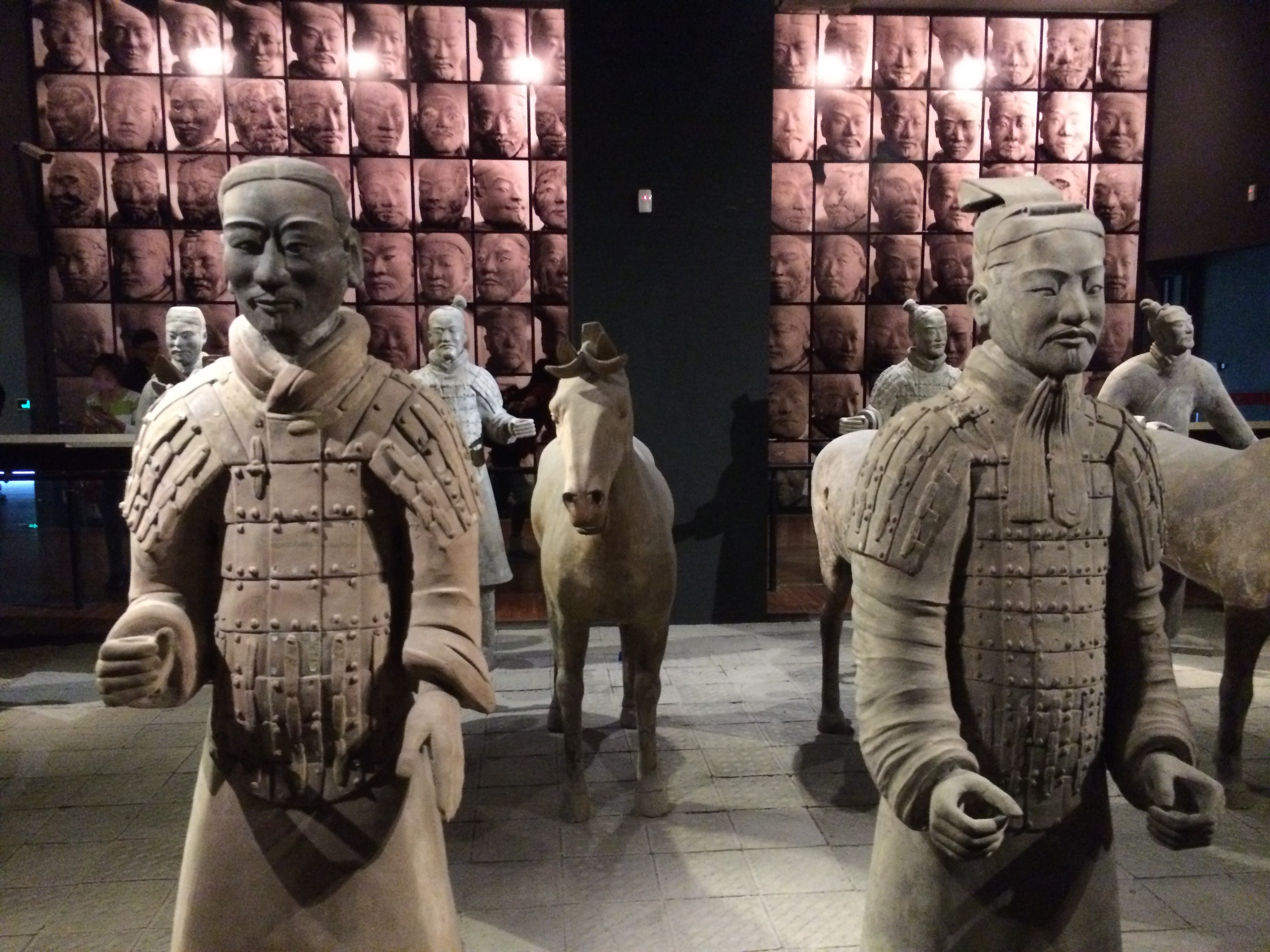
Soldiers from the Terracotta Army

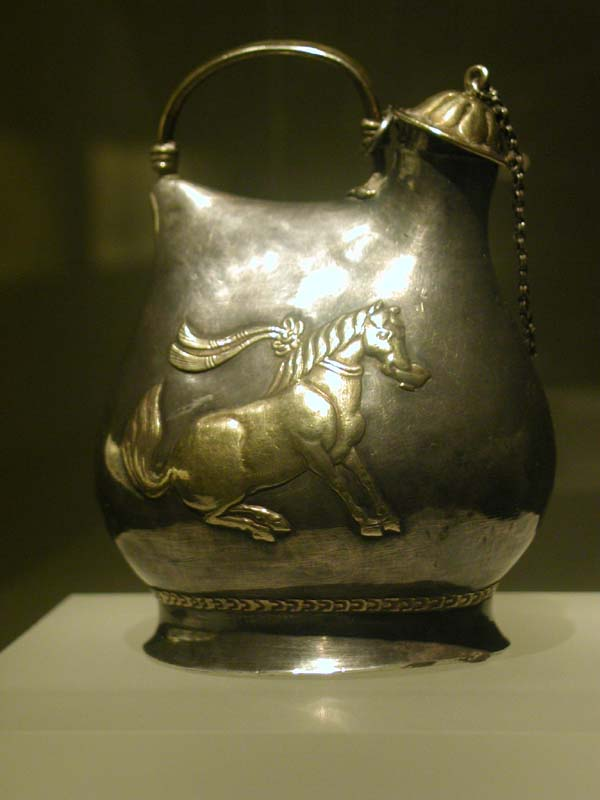
Gilt silver jar with patterns of dancing horses, from the Tang dynasty, Hejia Village hoard

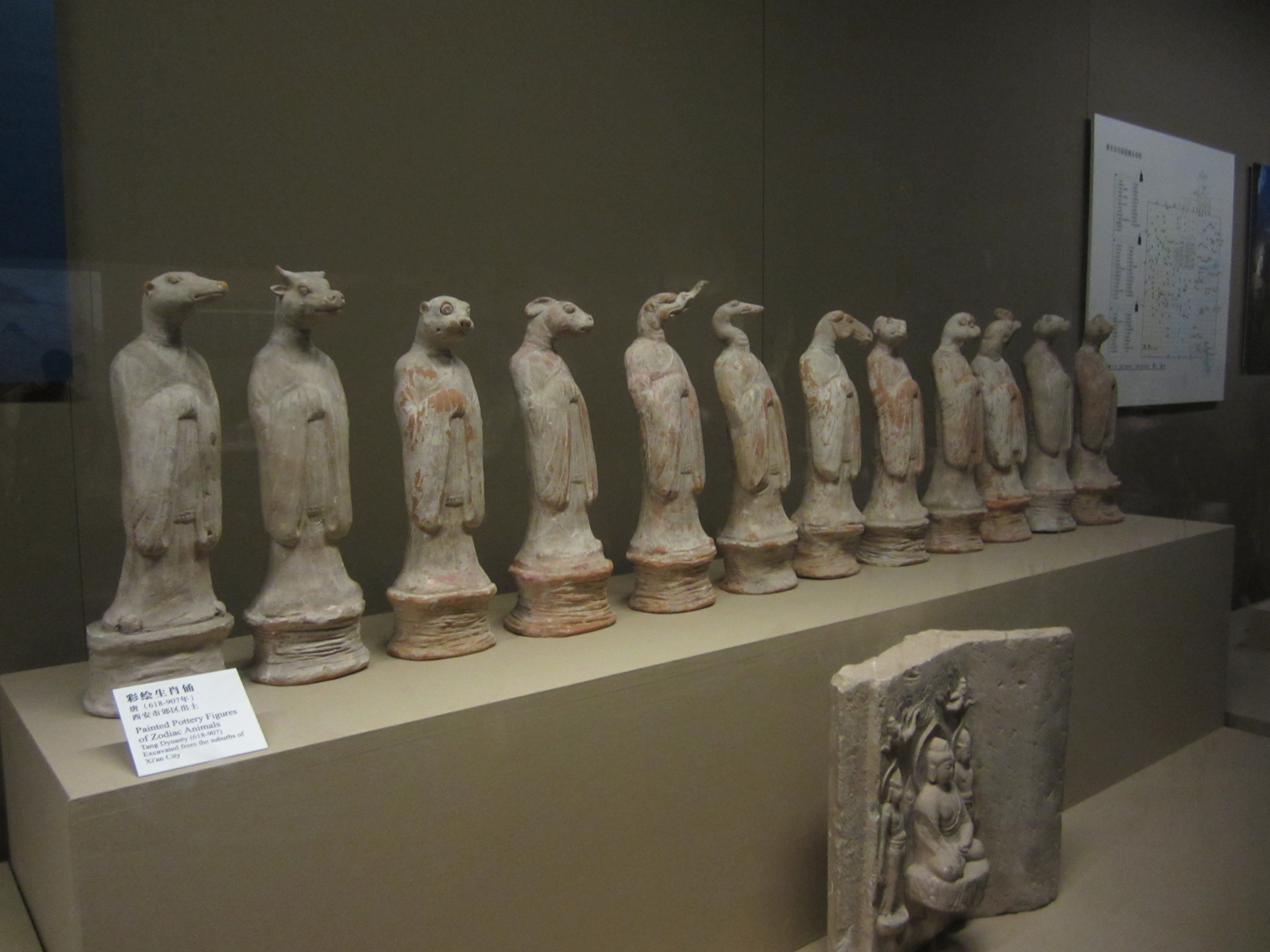
Sculptures of the twelve Chinese zodiac figures, from the Tang dynasty

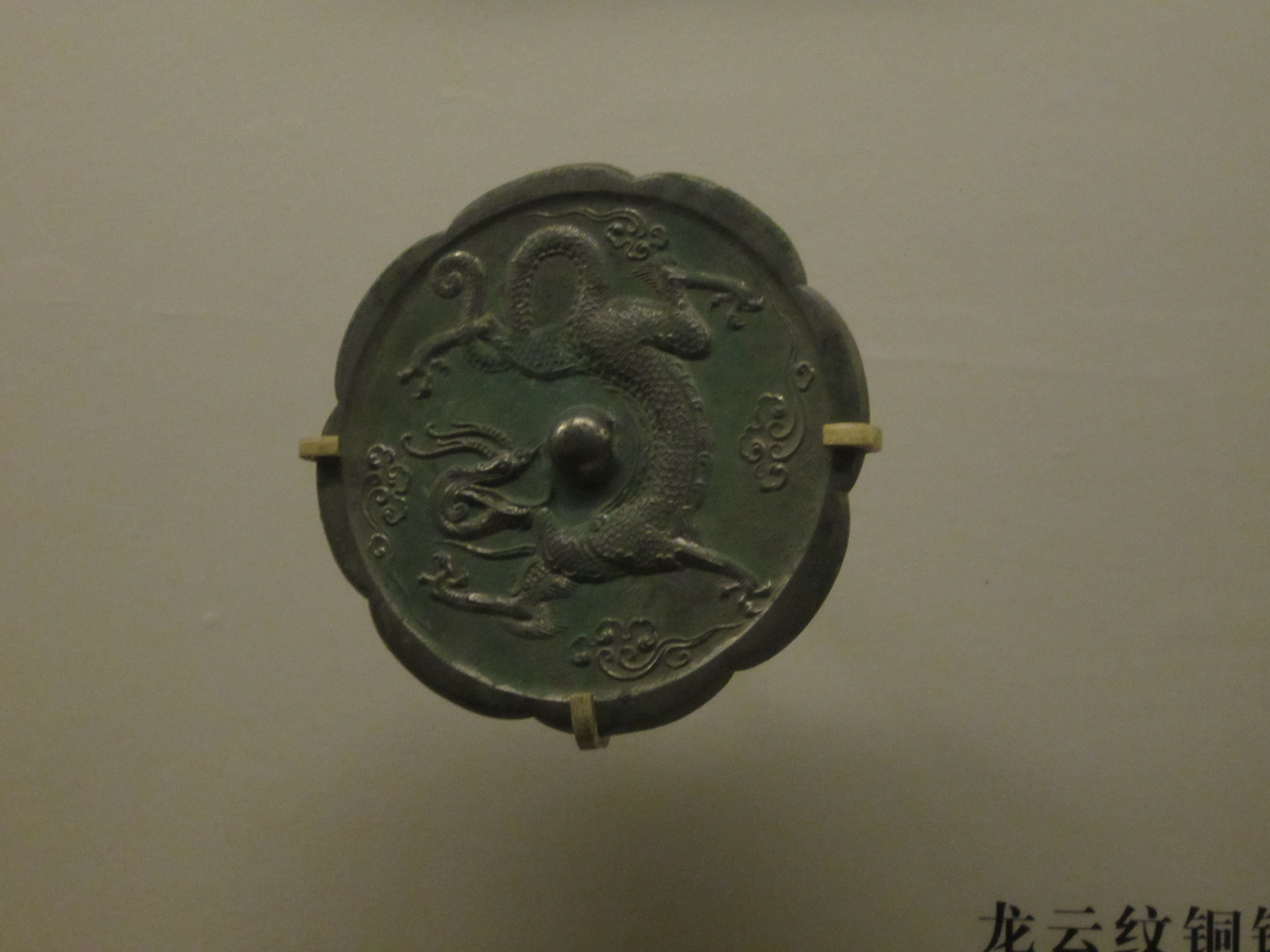
The back of a Tang dynasty bronze mirror

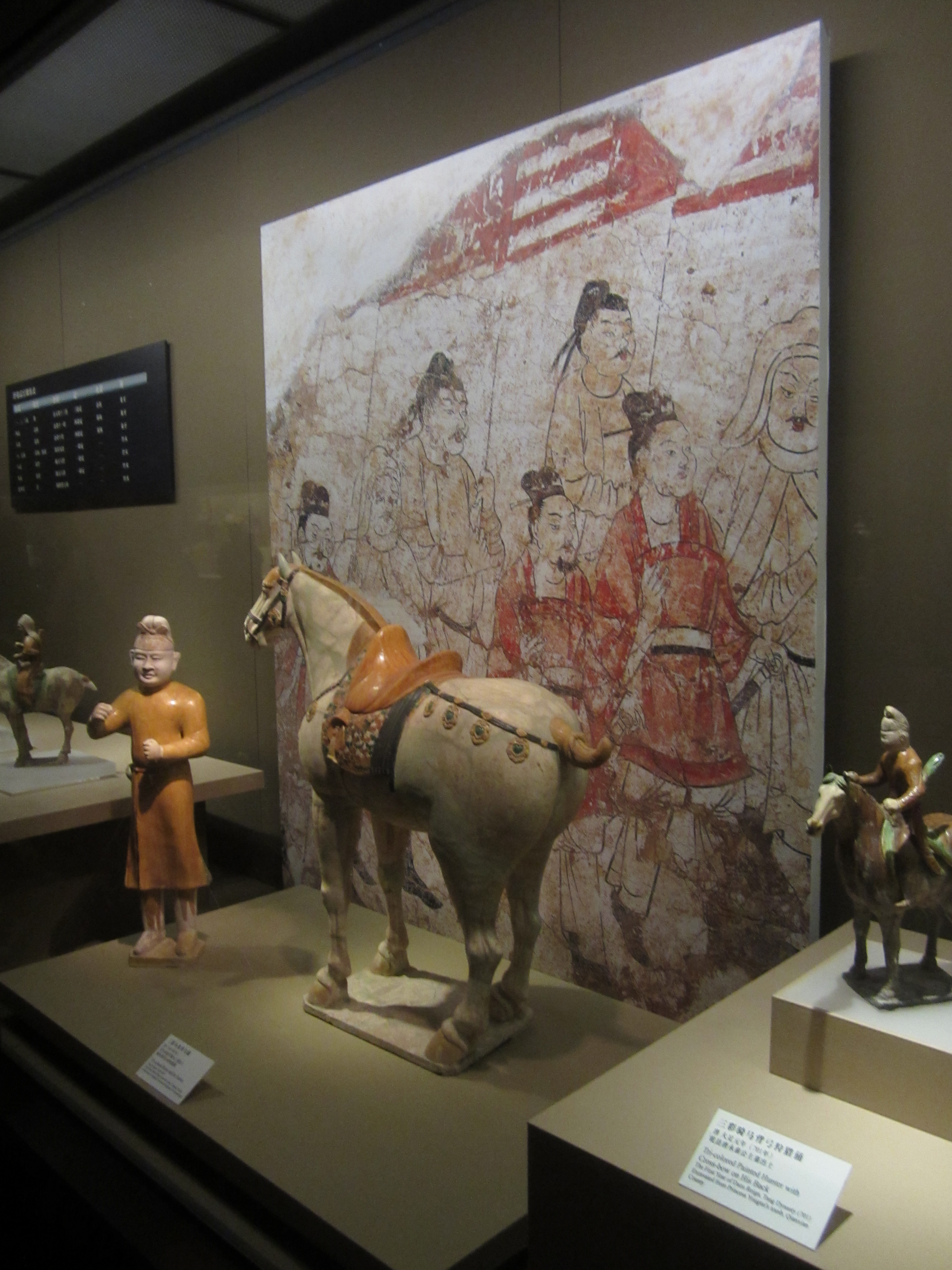
Tang Sancai tomb figures

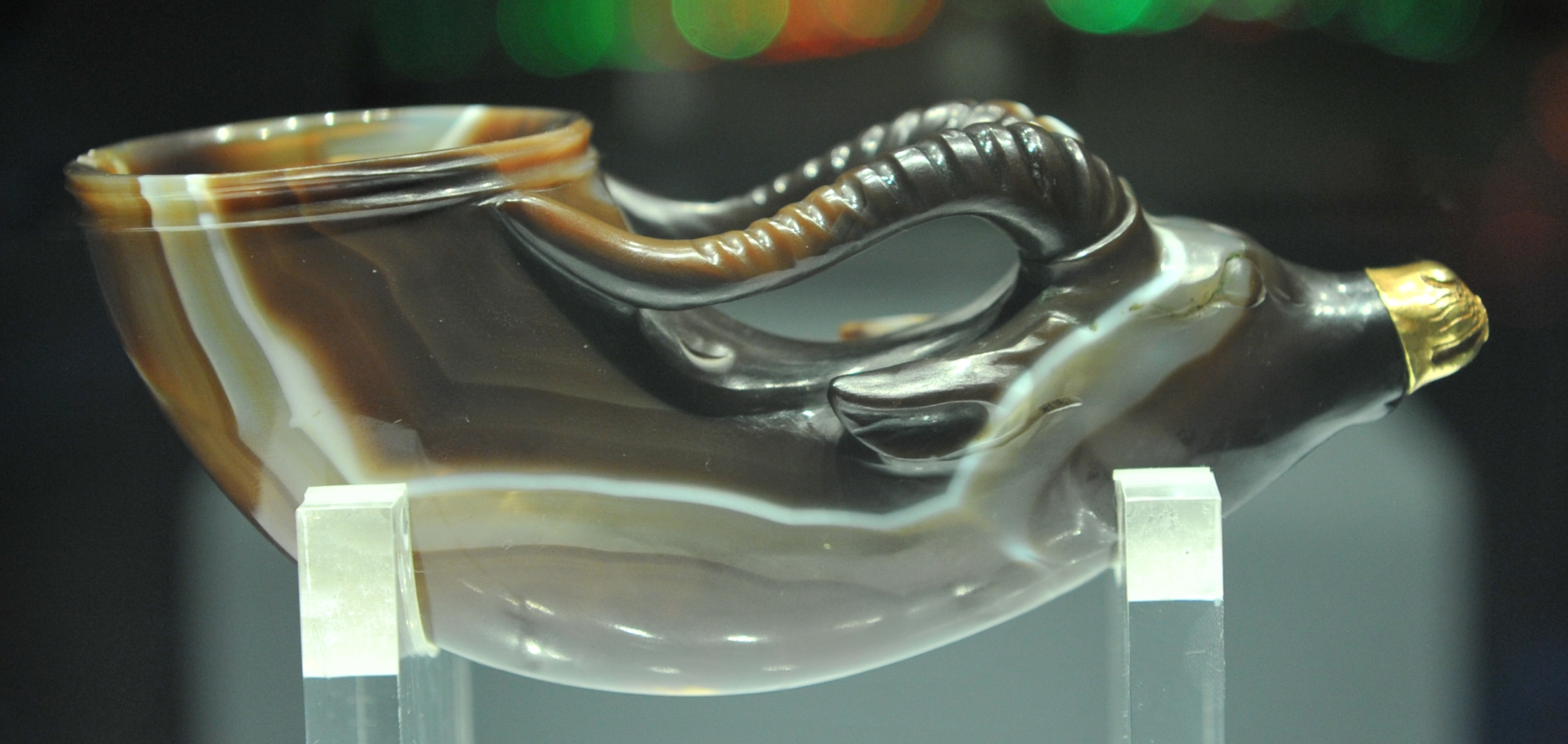
An agate cup shaped in an animal head, from the Tang dynasty, Hejia Village hoard

== Location ==
The address of the museum is 91 East XiaoZhai Road, Xi'an, Shaanxi Province, China.

== See also ==
- List of museums in China
