= Yongningmen station =

Metro station in Xi'an, China

Coordinates: 34.2505°N 108.9423°E

Yongningmen 永宁门
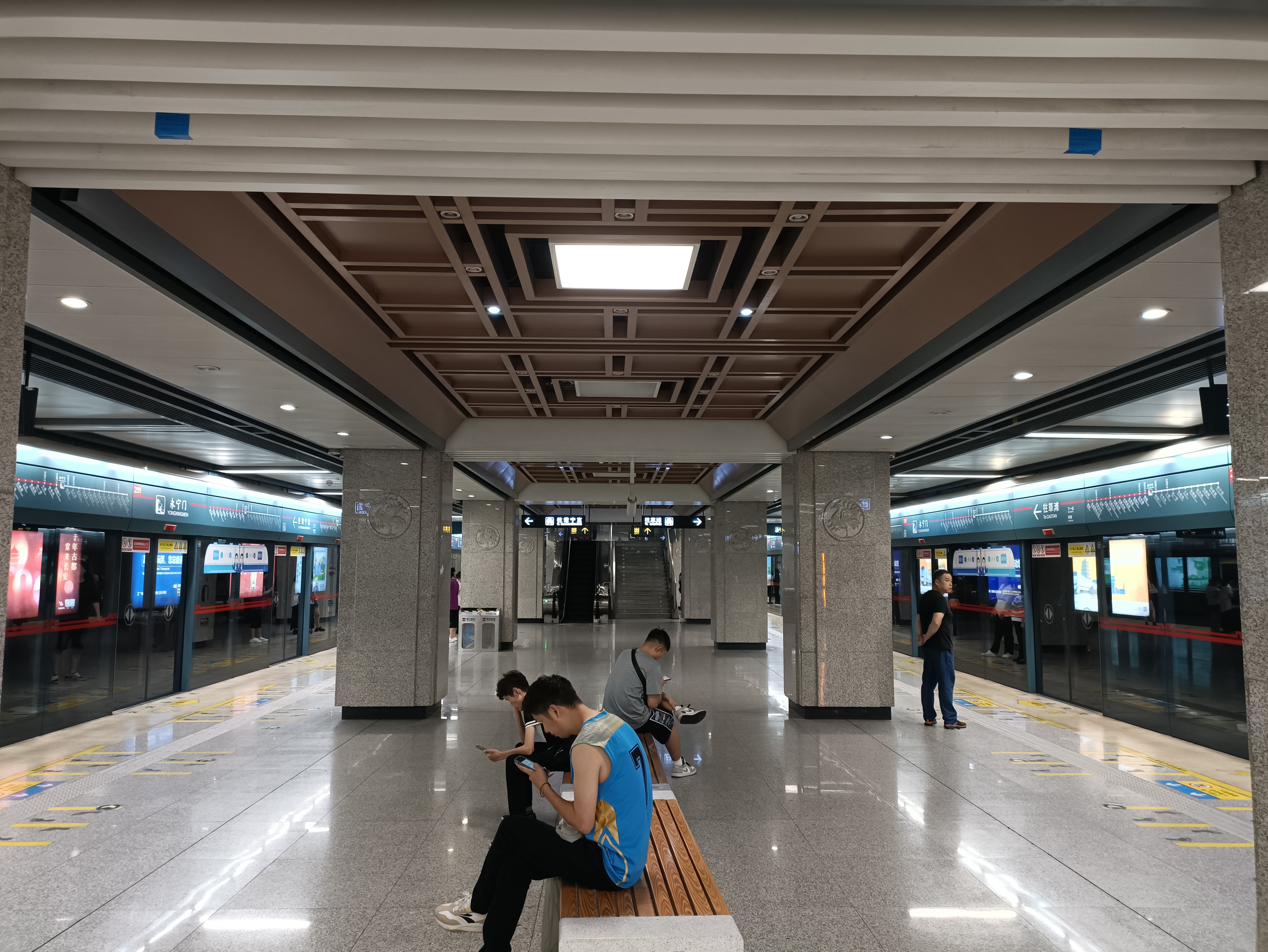

Chinese name
- Traditional Chinese: 永寧門
- Simplified Chinese: 永宁门
Transcriptions
Standard Mandarin
- Hanyu Pinyin: Yǒngníngmén
- Wade–Giles: Yung^{3}-ning^{2}-mên^{2}
- IPA: [jʊ̀ŋ.nǐŋ.mə̌n]

General information
- Location: Beilin District, Xi'an, Shaanxi; China
- Operator: Xi'an Metro Co. Ltd.
- Line: Line 2
- Platforms: 2 (1 island platform)

Construction
- Structure type: Underground

History
- Opened: 16 September 2011

Services
Preceding station	Xi'an Metro	Following station
Zhonglou towards Caotan	Line 2	Nanshaomen towards Changninggong
Location

Yongningmen station (Chinese: 永宁门站) is a station of Line 2 of the Xi'an Metro. It started operations on 16 September 2011.
