= Line 6 (Xi'an Metro) =

Metro line in Xi'an, China

- 6
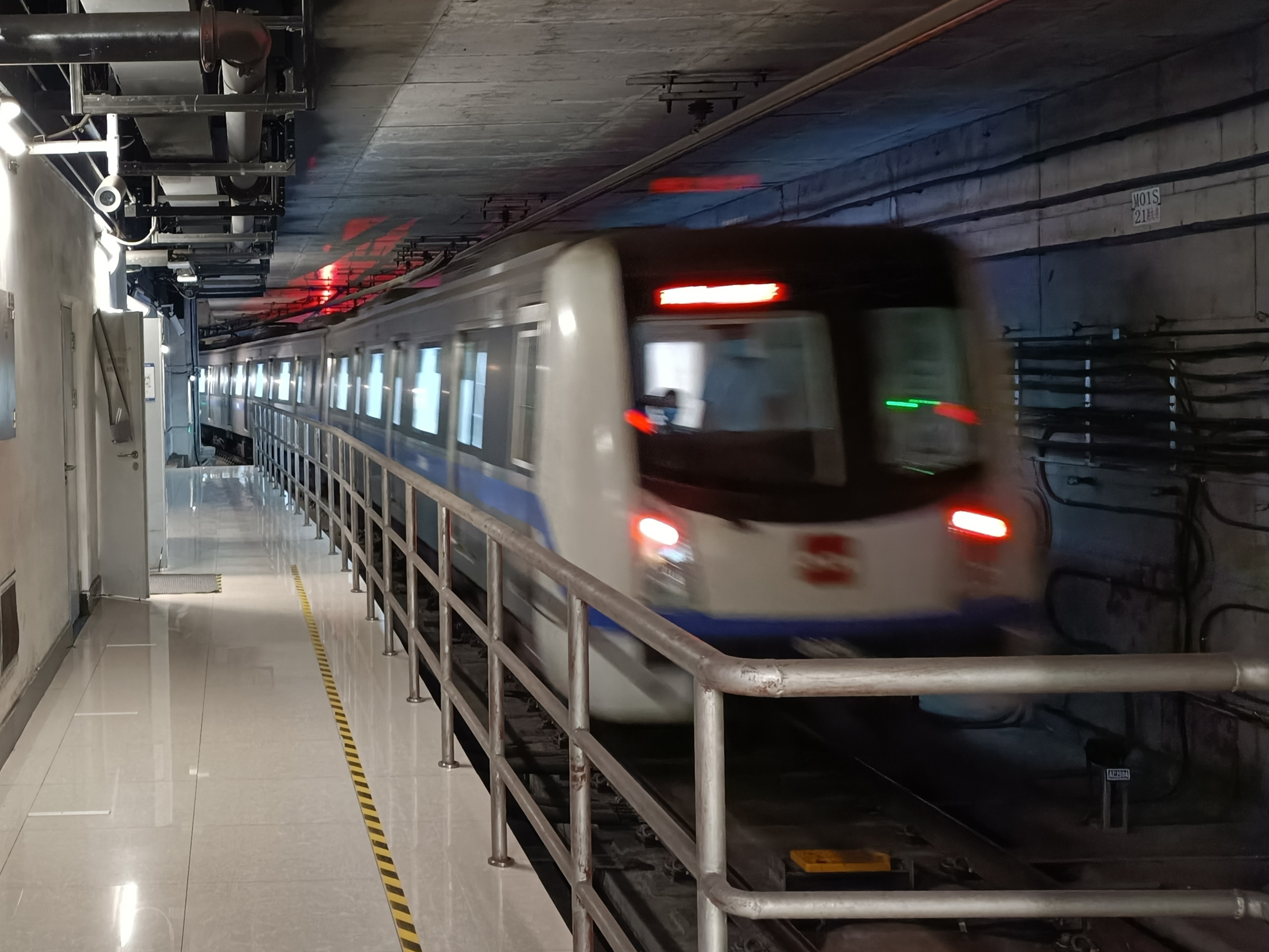
- A train of Xi'an Metro Line 6

Overview
- Status: Operational
- Owner: Xi'an
- Locale: Xi'an; Shaanxi
- Termini: Xi'annanzhan; Fangzhicheng
- Stations: 32

Service
- Type: Rapid transit
- System: Xi'an Metro
- Services: 1
- Operator: Xi'an Metro Corporation

History
- Opened: 28 December 2020; 5 years ago

Technical
- Line length: 39.6 km (24.6 mi) (in operation)
- Number of tracks: 2
- Character: Underground
- Track gauge: 1,435 mm (4 ft 8 1/2 in)

Line 6 is a line of the Xi'an Metro. The line runs from southwest to northeast, starting at Xi'annanzhan and ending at Fangzhicheng. The line is colored Pantone 2726C (blue) on maps.

== History ==
=== Opening timeline ===
Segment	Commencement	Length	Station(s)	Name
Xi'anguojiyixuezhongxin - Xibeigongyedaxue	28 December 2020	15.6 km (9.69 mi)	13	Phase 1
Xibeigongyedaxue - Fangzhicheng	29 December 2022	19.5 km (12.12 mi)	17	Phase 2
Xi'annanzhan - Xi'anguojiyixuezhongxin	26 September 2024	4.5 km (2.80 mi)	2	Phase 1 south section

== Stations ==
The Xi'annanzhan - Xibeigongyedaxue service only operates in morning peak time.

Service route		Station name		Connections	Location
Service route		English	Chinese	Connections	Location
●	●	Xi'annanzhan	西安南站	Xi'an South (U/C)	Chang'an
●	●	Xidiankedananxiaoqu · Weilaizhitong	西电科大南校区·未来之瞳		Chang'an
●	●	Xi'anguojiyixuezhongxin	西安国际医学中心		Chang'an
●	●	Rencun	仁村		Chang'an
●	●	Guoduxi	郭杜西	15	Chang'an
●	●	Xibudadao (Xitailukou)	西部大道（西太路口）		Chang'an
●	●	Zaozitai	造字台		Chang'an
●	●	Zhangba 6-lu	丈八六路		Yanta
●	●	Zhangba 4-lu	丈八四路	Xi'an SkyShuttle	Yanta
●	●	Zhangba 1-lu	丈八一路		Yanta
●	●	Shengtiyuguan	省体育馆	8	Yanta
●	●	Mutasi	木塔寺		Yanta
●	●	Ganjiazhai	甘家寨		Yanta
●	●	Kejilu	科技路	3	Yanta
●	●	Xibeigongyedaxue	西北工业大学	5	Beilin / Lianhu
●		Datangxishi	大唐西市		Lianhu
●		Andingmen	安定门		Lianhu
●		Qiaozikou	桥梓口		Lianhu
●		Guangjijie	广济街		Beilin / Lianhu
●		Zhonglou	钟楼	2	Beilin / Lianhu / Xincheng
●		Dachaishi	大差市	4	Beilin / Xincheng
●		Changlemen	长乐门		Beilin
●		Jiaotongdaxue · Xingqinggong	交通大学·兴庆宫		Beilin
●		Xianninglu	咸宁路	3	Beilin / Xincheng
●		Gongyuannanlu	公园南路		Beilin / Xincheng
●		Wanshounanlu	万寿南路	8	Xincheng
●		Weixingcekongzhongxin	卫星测控中心		Xincheng
●		Tianjiawan	田家湾		Baqiao
●		Mujiangwang	穆将王		Baqiao
●		Fang 6-lu	纺六路		Baqiao
●		Fang 2-lu	纺二路		Baqiao
●		Fangzhicheng	纺织城	1 9	Baqiao
