= Nanshaomen station =

Metro station in Xi'an, China

Coordinates: 34.2427°N 108.9422°E

Nanshaomen 南稍门
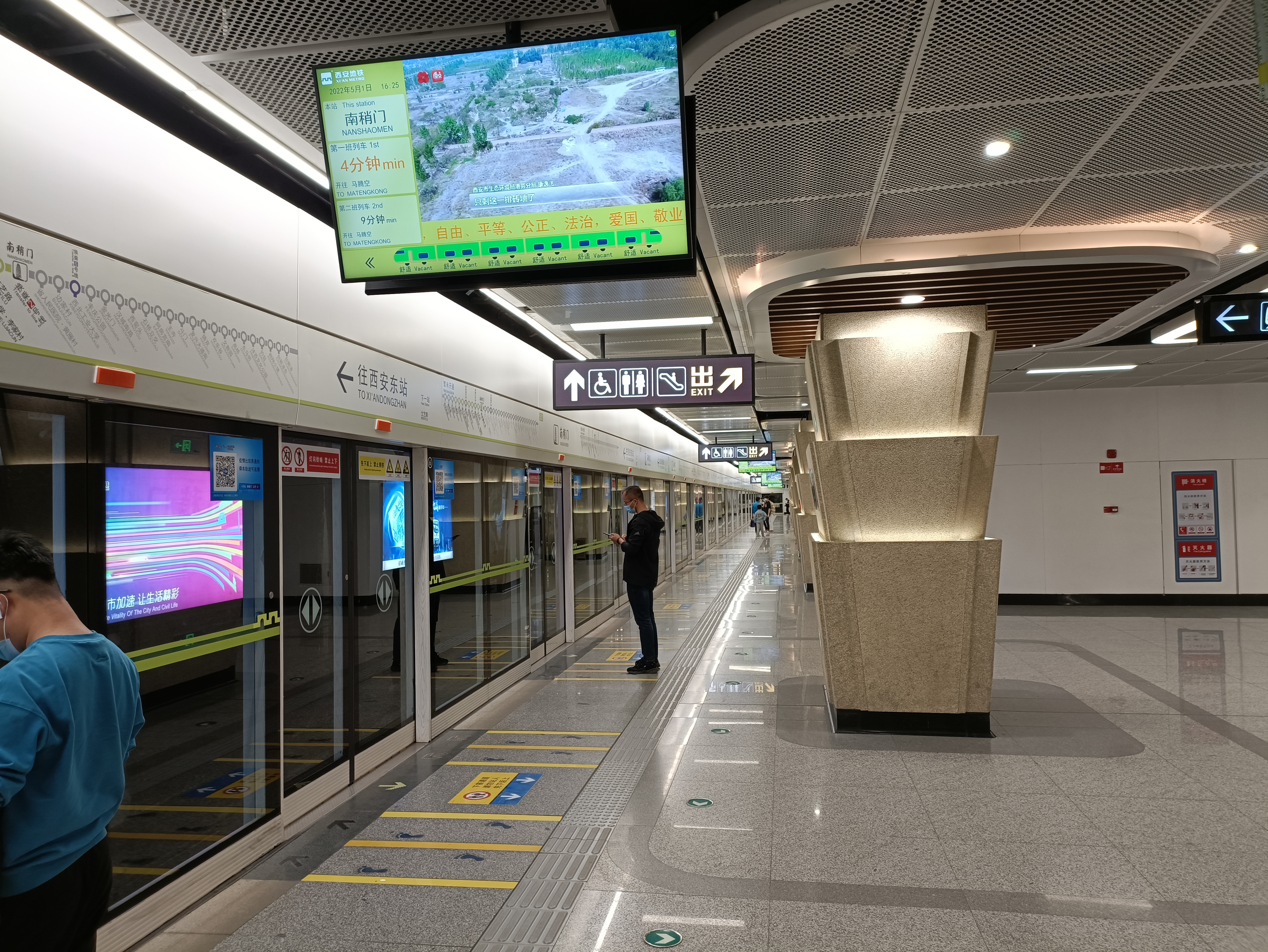
- Line 5 platform

Chinese name
- Traditional Chinese: 南稍門
- Simplified Chinese: 南稍门
Transcriptions
Standard Mandarin
- Hanyu Pinyin: Nánshàomén
- Wade–Giles: Nan^{2}-shao^{4}-mên^{2}
- IPA: [nǎn.ʂâʊ.mə̌n]

General information
- Location: Beilin District, Xi'an, Shaanxi; China
- Operator: Xi'an Metro Co. Ltd.
- Lines: Line 2 Line 5
- Platforms: 4 (2 island platforms)

Construction
- Structure type: Underground

History
- Opened: 16 September 2011 (Line 2); 28 December 2020 (Line 5)

Services
Preceding station	Xi'an Metro	Following station
Yongningmen towards Caotan	Line 2	Tiyuchang towards Changninggong
Shengrenminyiyuan · Huangyancun towards Chuangxingang	Line 5	Wenyilu towards Xi'an Dongzhan
Location

Nanshaomen station (Chinese: 南稍门站) is a station of Line 2 and Line 5 of the Xi'an Metro in China. It started operations on 16 September 2011.
