= Line 9 (Xi'an Metro) =

Metro line in Xi'an, China

- 9
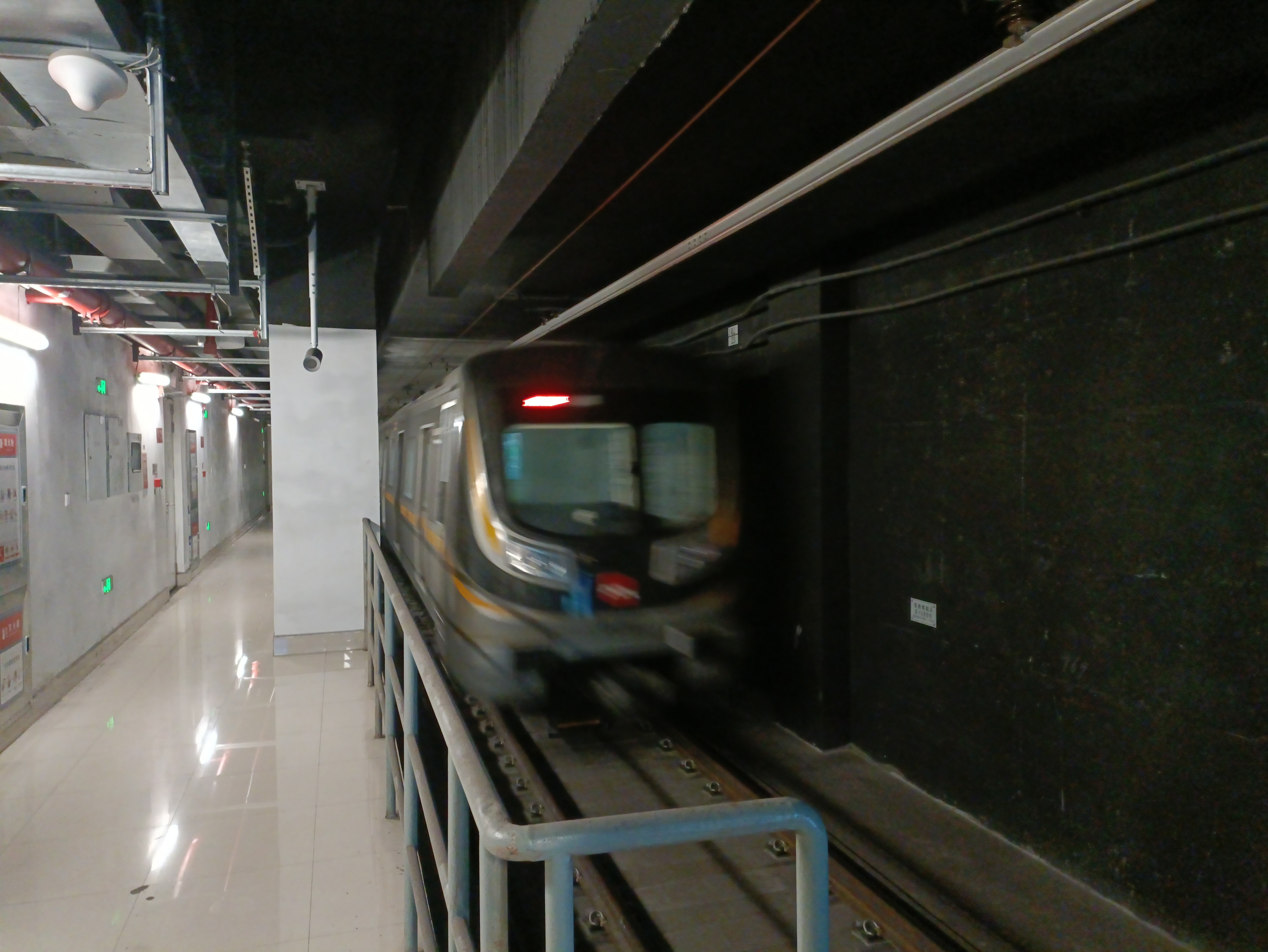
- A train of Xi'an Metro Line 9

Overview
- Native name: 西安地铁9号线
- Status: Operational
- Locale: Xi'an, Shaanxi, China
- Termini: Fangzhicheng; Qinlingxi
- Stations: 15

Service
- Type: Rapid transit
- System: Xi'an Metro
- Operator(s): Xi'an Metro Corporation

History
- Opened: 28 December 2020; 4 years ago

Technical
- Line length: 25.2 km (15.7 miles)
- Number of tracks: 2
- Track gauge: 1,435 mm (4 ft 8 1/2 in)

Line 9 of Xi'an Metro is a metro line in Xi'an, Shaanxi, China, which opened in 2020.

== Stations ==
Station name		Connections
English	Chinese	Connections
Fangzhicheng	纺织城	1 6
Xiangwang	香王	
Baliu 2 Lu	灞柳二路	
Tianwang	田王	
Hongqing	洪庆	
Zixia 3 Lu	紫霞三路	
Fenghuangchi	凤凰池	
Yingwusigongyuan	鹦鹉寺公园	
Zhiyangguangchang	芷阳广场	
Xigongchengda · Xikeda (Lintongxiaoqu)	西工程大·西科大（临潼校区）	
Xihuayuan	西花园	
Huaqingchi	华清池	
Dongsancha	东三岔	
Yinqiaodadao	银桥大道	
Qinlingxi	秦陵西	
