= Xiaozhai station =

Metro station in Xi'an, China

Xiaozhai 小寨
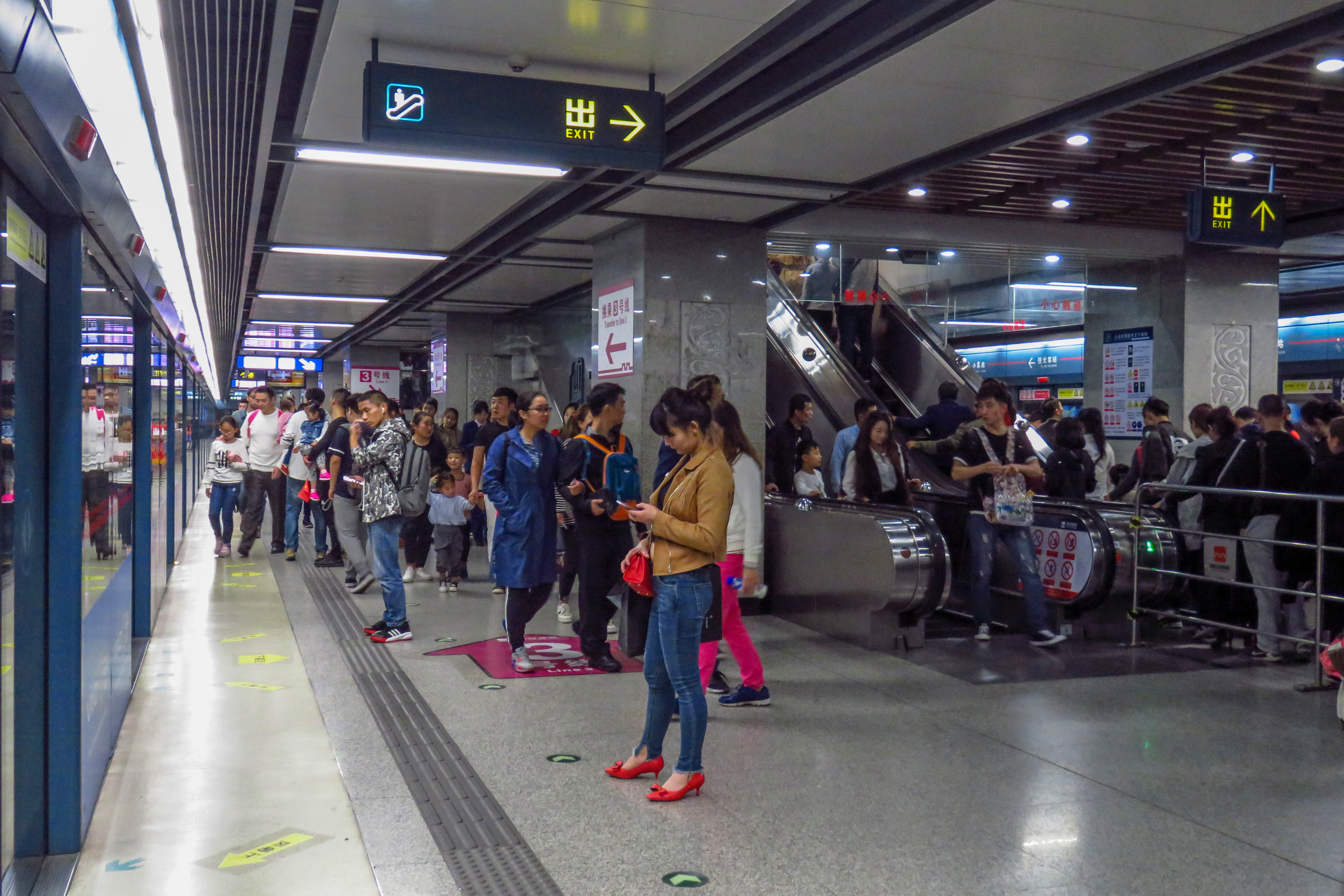
- Line 2 platform

General information
- Location: Chang'an Middle Road × Xiaozhai West Road & Xiaozhai East Road; Yanta District, Xi'an, Shaanxi; China
- Coordinates: 34°13′28″N 108°56′32″E
- Operated by: Xi'an Metro Co. Ltd.
- Lines: Line 2 Line 3
- Platforms: 4 (2 island platforms)

Construction
- Structure type: Underground
- Accessible: Yes

History
- Opened: 16 September 2011 (Line 2); 8 November 2016 (Line 3)

Services
Preceding station	Xi'an Metro	Following station
Tiyuchang towards Caotan	Line 2	Balicun towards Changninggong
Jixiangcun towards Yuhuazhai	Line 3	Dayanta towards Baoshuiqu
Location

Xiaozhai station (Chinese: 小寨站) is a station on Line 2 and Line 3 of the Xi'an Metro. It is one of the busiest metro stations in Xi'an. It began operations on 16 September 2011.
