= Qinlingxi station =

Metro station in Xi'an, China

Qinlingxi 秦陵西
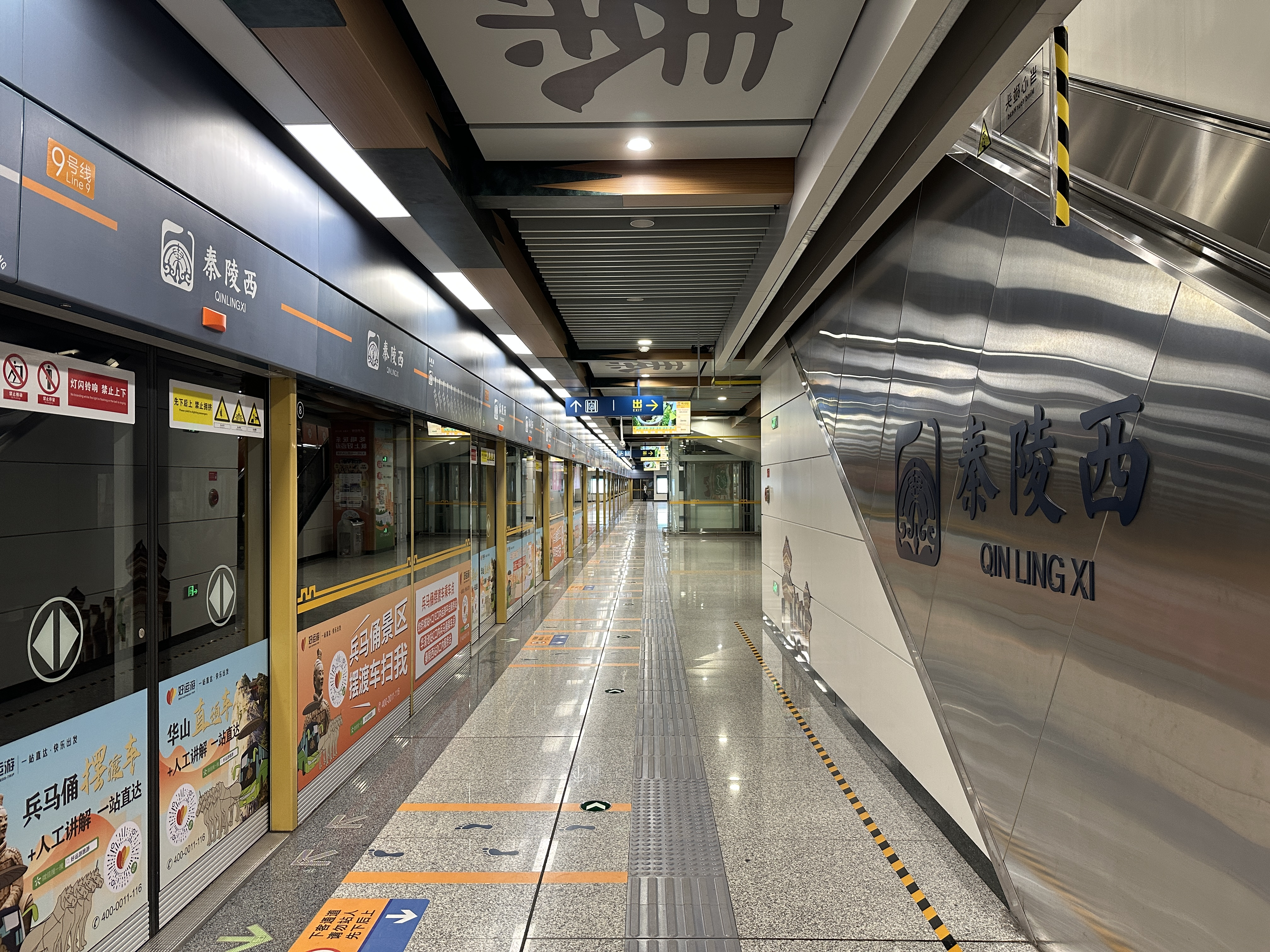
- Platform

Chinese name
- Traditional Chinese: 秦陵西
- Simplified Chinese: 秦陵西
- Literal meaning: Qin Mausoleum West
Transcriptions
Standard Mandarin
- Hanyu Pinyin: Qín líng xī
- Wade–Giles: Ch‘in^{2} ling^{2} hsi^{1}
- IPA: [tɕʰǐn lǐŋ ɕí]

General information
- Location: Lintong District, Xi'an, Shaanxi; China
- Operator: Xi'an Metro Co. Ltd.
- Line: Line 9
- Platforms: 2 (1 island platform)

Construction
- Structure type: Underground

History
- Opened: 28 December 2020

Services
Preceding station	Xi'an Metro	Following station
Yinqiaodadao towards Fangzhicheng	Line 9	Terminus
Location

Qinlingxi station (Chinese: 秦陵西站) is a station of Line 9 of the Xi'an Metro located in Xi'an's Lintong District. It started operations on 28 December 2020.

The station is named after the Mausoleum of Qin Shi Huang, which is two kilometers away.

== Station layout ==
G	Exits	Exits A–D
L1; Concourse	Lobby	Customer service, ticket machines, ticket gates, Chang'an Card machines
L2; Platforms	arrow for L	9 towards Fangzhicheng (Yinqiaodadao)
L2; Platforms	Island platform, doors open on the left
L2; Platforms	arrow for R	9 termination platform

== Exits ==
Designation	Nearby landmarks	Image
A	National Highway 108 (W), Qinhan Avenue (N), Shangchen Road	
B	National Highway 108 (W), Qinhan Avenue (S), Party School of the CPC Xi'an Lintong District Committee	
C	National Highway 108 (E), Zhuanfang North Road, Lintong District Meteorological Bureau	
D	National Highway 108 (E), Zhiyu Road	
