= Line 3 (Xi'an Metro) =

Metro line in Xi'an, China

- 3
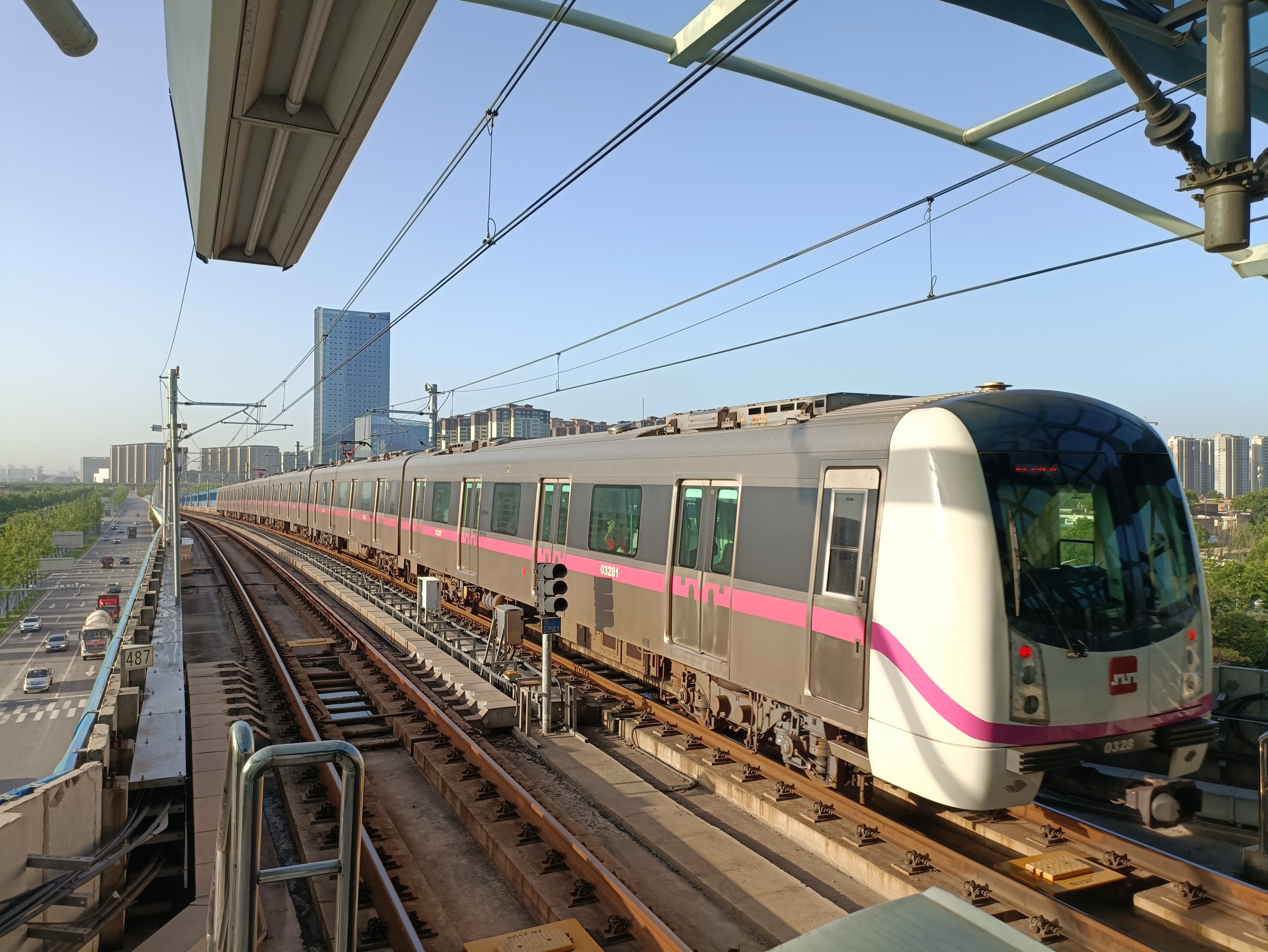
- A train of Xi'an Metro Line 3

Overview
- Native name: 西安地铁三号线
- Status: Operational
- Owner: Xi'an Metro Ltd
- Locale: Xi'an, Shaanxi
- Termini: Yuhuazhai; Baoshuiqu
- Stations: 26
- Color on map: Pink
- Website: Xi'an Metro

Service
- Type: Rapid Transit
- System: Xi'an Metro
- Services: 1
- Operator(s): Xi'an Metro Ltd
- Depot(s): Yuhuazhai Depot and Guoji Gangwuqu Depot
- Rolling stock: CNR DKZ17
- Daily ridership: 854,800 (2021 record)

History
- Opened: 8 November 2016; 8 years ago

Technical
- Line length: 39.15 km (24.33 mi)
- Number of tracks: 2
- Character: Underground and overground
- Track gauge: 1,435 mm (4 ft 8 1/2 in) standard gauge
- Electrification: 1500 V DC Overhead catenary
- Operating speed: 80 km/h (maximum), 35 km/h (average)

Line 3 of the Xi'an Metro (Chinese: 西安地铁三号线; pinyin: Xī'ān dìtiě sānhàoxiàn) is a rapid transit line running from northeast to southwest Xi'an, linking Xi'an International Trade & Logistics Park in the northwest through Xi'an Economic & Technological Development Zone to Yuhuazhai in the southwest. Line 3 is one of the three lines that form the main framework of Xi'an metro. Phase 1 of Line 3 was opened on November 8, 2016, with 19 underground stations and 7 overground stations. Phase 2 is still under planning. The line is colored pink on system maps.

== Opening timeline ==
Segment	Commencement	Length	Station(s)	Name
Yuhuazhai — Baoshuiqu	8 November 2016	39.1 km (24.30 mi)	26	Phase 1

== Stations (from south to north) ==
Service routes		Station name		Connections	Distance km		Location
Service routes		English	Chinese	Connections	Distance km		Location
●	●	Yuhuazhai	鱼化寨	Xi'an SkyShuttle	0.000	0.000	Yanta
●	●	Zhangbabeilu	丈八北路		2.311	2.311	Yanta
●	●	Yanpingmen	延平门	8	1.244	3.555	Yanta
●	●	Kejilu	科技路	6	1.761	5.316	Yanta
●	●	Taibainanlu	太白南路		1.262	6.579	Yanta
●	●	Jixiangcun	吉祥村		1.618	8.197	Yanta
●	●	Xiaozhai	小寨	2	1.350	9.547	Yanta
●	●	Dayanta	大雁塔	4	1.493	11.040	Yanta
●	●	Beichitou	北池头		1.277	12.317	Yanta
●	●	Qinglongsi	青龙寺	5	1.783	14.100	Yanta
●	●	Yanxingmen (Shapo)	延兴门（沙坡）		1.869	15.968	Beilin
●	●	Xianninglu	咸宁路	6	0.799	16.767	Beilin/Xincheng
●	●	Changlegongyuan	长乐公园		1.114	17.881	Xincheng
●	●	Tonghuamen	通化门	1	0.962	18.843	Xincheng
●	●	Hujiamiao	胡家庙		0.893	19.736	Xincheng
●	●	Shijiajie	石家街		1.477	21.214	Xincheng
●	●	Xinjiamiao	辛家庙		1.557	22.771	Weiyang
●	●	Guangtaimen	广泰门	8	2.008	24.779	Weiyang
●	●	Taohuatan	桃花潭		1.828	26.607	Baqiao
●	●	Chanbazhongxin	浐灞中心		1.574	28.181	Baqiao
●	●	Xianghuwan (Huangdeng)	香湖湾（黄邓）		1.597	29.778	Baqiao
●		Wuzhuang	务庄		2.166	31.945	Baqiao
●		Guojigangwuqu	国际港务区		2.233	34.178	Baqiao
●		Shuangzhai	双寨	14	1.264	35.442	Baqiao
●		Xinzhu	新筑		1.193	36.635	Baqiao
●		Baoshuiqu	保税区		1.397	38.032	Baqiao

== Future development ==
Phase 2

Phase 2 of Line 3 is still in long-term planning. It will be an extension from the southwest terminus of Phase 1, Yuhuazhai station to Kunmingchi station (tentatively named). After the completion of Phase 2, Line 3 will have 30 stations (an addition of 4 to Phase 1) and a length of 50.5 km (31.4 mi) in total.

== Rolling stock ==
The rolling stock consists solely of CNR DKZ17 trains manufactured by CNR Dalian, 41 trainsets will be provided as per the first contract. The trains run in six-car formation, with four motor cars and two trailer cars, which is different from previous trains (running in 3-3 formation), as more power is required to drive the trains up the ramp from underground to overground sections.

DKZ17
- Manufacturer: CNR
- Built at: CNR Dalian, CNR Changchun and CSR Sifang
- Formation: Six-car formation Tc-Mp-M-T-Mp-Tc (Note: Note that trains running on line 3 will be different with 4 motor cars and 2 trailer cars.)
- Capacity: 1468(rated) 1880(maximum)
- Operators: Xi'an Metro

Specifications
- Train length: 19 m (62 ft 4 in)
- Width: 2.8 m (9 ft 2 in)
- Height: 3.8 m (12 ft 6 in)
- Electric system(s): 1500 V DC Overhead catenary

== Train Control ==
Line 3, as all the previous lines, uses Trainguard MT CBTC signal system manufactured by Siemens to enhance the safety of the automated, driverless trains.

== Incidents ==
=== Defective cable incident ===
On 13 March 2017, a post titled Do you still dare to take the Xi'an Metro? (西安的地铁你们还敢坐吗) was posted by an anonymous whistle-blower on an online forum. The poster claimed that the electrical cables used on Line 3 of Xi'an Metro, which were produced by Shaanxi Aokai Electrical Cables (Aokai Cables), did not meet the safety criteria, specifically, the cross-sectional area was smaller than specified, which might lead to overheating of the cables, therefore presenting a fire hazard.

On 15 March, Aokai Cables released a statement that the claims were unfounded and they have filed a police report.

On 16 March, the official Xi'an Metro Weibo account announced that they had launched an official investigation and an internal audit. On the same day, the government of Xi'an pledged to investigate the matter.

On 20 March, the government of Xi'an told a press conference that none out of five cable samples sampled were of acceptable quality.

In the wake of the incident, 8 members of staff from Aokai cables were arrested and disciplinary actions were taken against 122 local officials, including 8 bureau-directors and 58 division heads.
