= Xinzhu station =

Metro station in Xi'an, China

Xinzhu 新筑
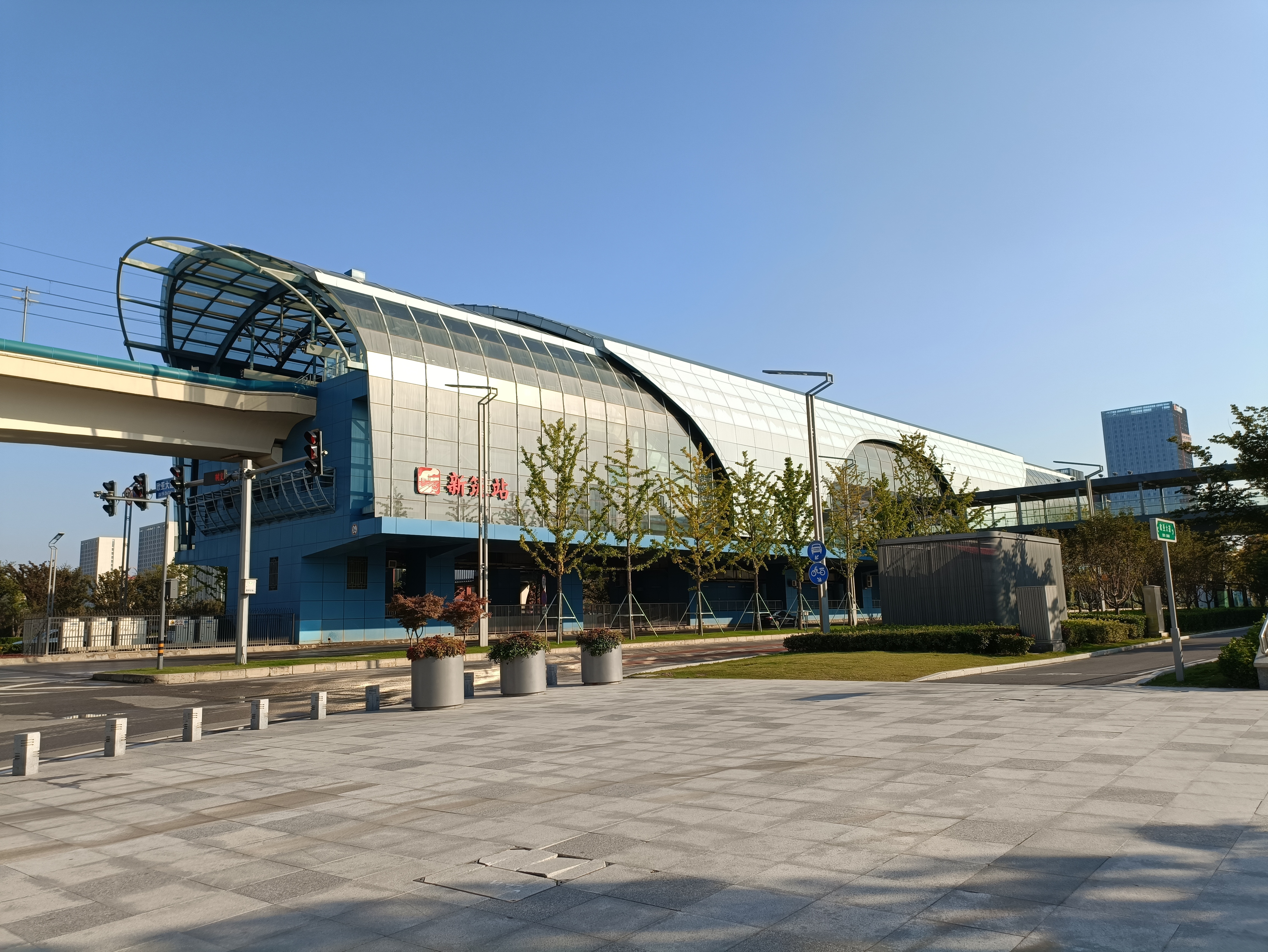

General information
- Location: Baqiao District, Xi'an, Shaanxi; China
- Coordinates: 34.38437°N 109.03764°E
- Operated by: Xi'an Metro Co. Ltd.
- Line: Line 3
- Platforms: 2 (2 side platforms)

Construction
- Structure type: Elevated

History
- Opened: 16 September 2016

Services
| Preceding station | Xi'an Metro | Following station |
|---|---|---|
| Shuangzhai towards Yuhuazhai | Line 3 | Baoshuiqu Terminus |
Location

Xinzhu station (Chinese: 新筑站; pinyin: Xīnzhù zhàn) is an overground metro station on Line 3 of the Xi'an Metro. It began operations on 8 November 2016.
