= Baoshuiqu station (Xi'an Metro) =

Metro station in Xi'an, China

Baoshuiqu 保税区
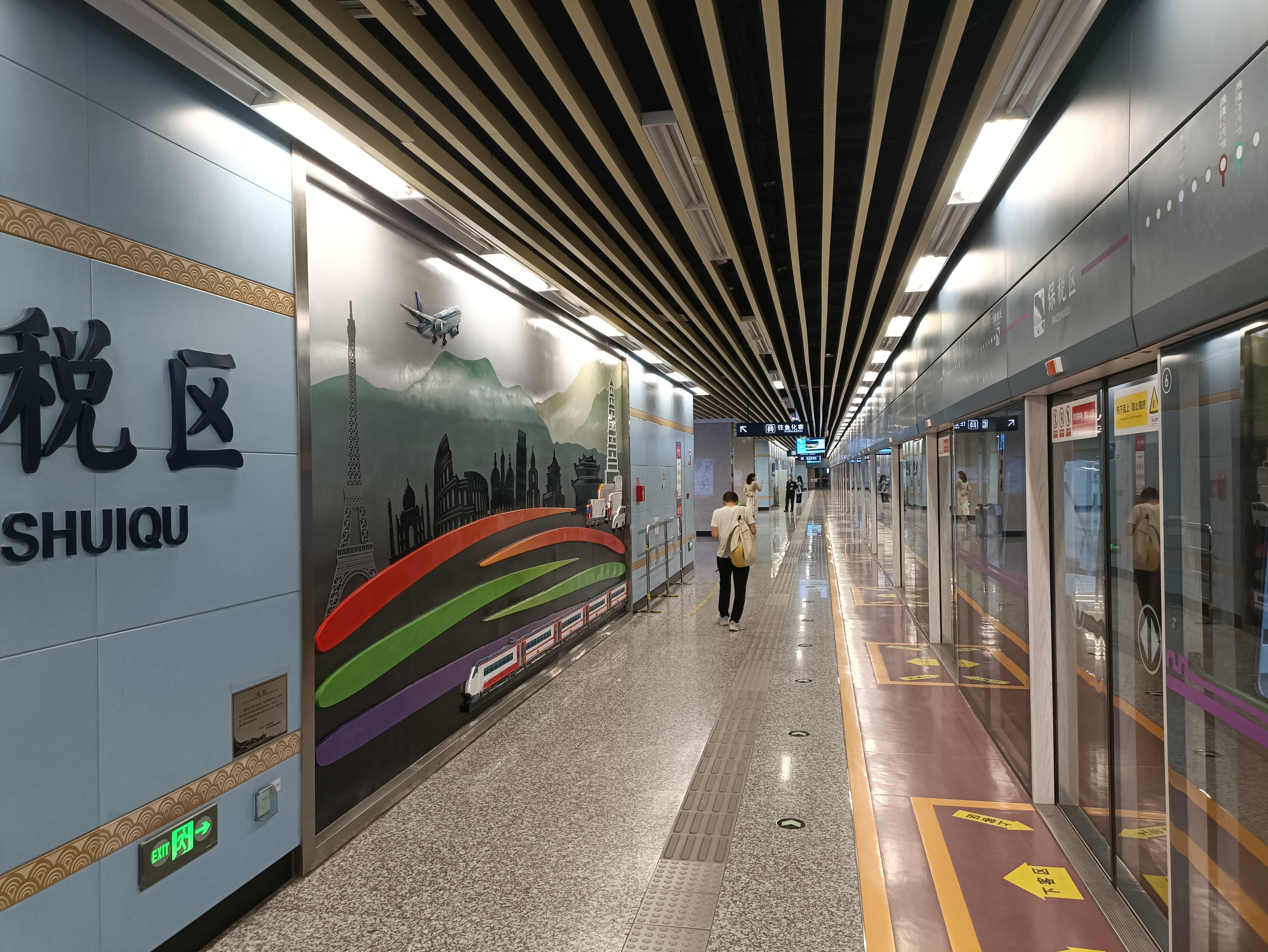

General information
- Location: Baqiao District, Xi'an, Shaanxi; China
- Coordinates: 34.3974°N 109.0386°E
- Operated by: Xi'an Metro Co. Ltd.
- Line: Line 3
- Platforms: 2 (2 side platforms)

Construction
- Structure type: Underground

History
- Opened: 16 September 2016

Services
Preceding station	Xi'an Metro	Following station
Xinzhu towards Yuhuazhai	Line 3	Terminus
Location

Baoshuiqu station (Chinese: 保税区站; pinyin: Bǎoshuìqū zhàn) is an underground metro station on Line 3 of the Xi'an Metro. It began operations on 8 November 2016. It is the northern terminus of Line 3. The preceding station is Xinzhu.
