= Xi'annanzhan station =

Metro station in Xi'an, China

Xi'annanzhan 西安南站
- Fangzhicheng-bound platform

Chinese name
- Chinese: 西安南站
- Literal meaning: Xi'an South railway station
Transcriptions
Standard Mandarin
- Hanyu Pinyin: Xī'ān nán zhàn
- Wade–Giles: Hsi^{1}-an^{1} nan^{2} chan^{4}
- IPA: [ɕí.án nǎn ʈʂân]

General information
- Location: Chang'an District, Xi'an, Shaanxi; China
- Operator: Xi'an Metro Co. Ltd.
- Line: Line 6
- Platforms: 2 (1 island platform)
- Connections: Xi'an South (planned)

Construction
- Structure type: Underground

History
- Opened: 26 September 2024

Services
Preceding station	Xi'an Metro	Following station
Terminus	Line 6	Xidiankedananxiaoqu · Weilaizhitong towards Fangzhicheng
Location

Xi'annanzhan station (Chinese: 西安南站; lit. 'Xi'an South railway station') is a station of Line 6 of the Xi'an Metro located in Xi'an's Chang'an District. It started operations on 26 September 2024.

The station is set to serve the future Xi'an South railway station, which it is named after.

== Station layout ==
G	Exits	Exits A1, A2, D
L1; Concourse	Lobby	Customer service, ticket machines, ticket gates, Chang'an Card machines
L2; Platforms	arrow for L	6 termination platform
L2; Platforms	Island platform, doors open on the left
L2; Platforms	arrow for R	6 towards Fangzhicheng (Xidiankedananxiaoqu · Weilaizhitong)

== Exits ==
Designation	Nearby landmarks	Image
A1	Xinghong First Road (W), Xinglong First Road (S)	
A2	Xinghong First Road (W), Xinglong First Road (N)	
D	Xinglong First Road (S)	
