= Fangzhicheng station =

Metro station in Xi'an, China

Fangzhicheng 纺织城
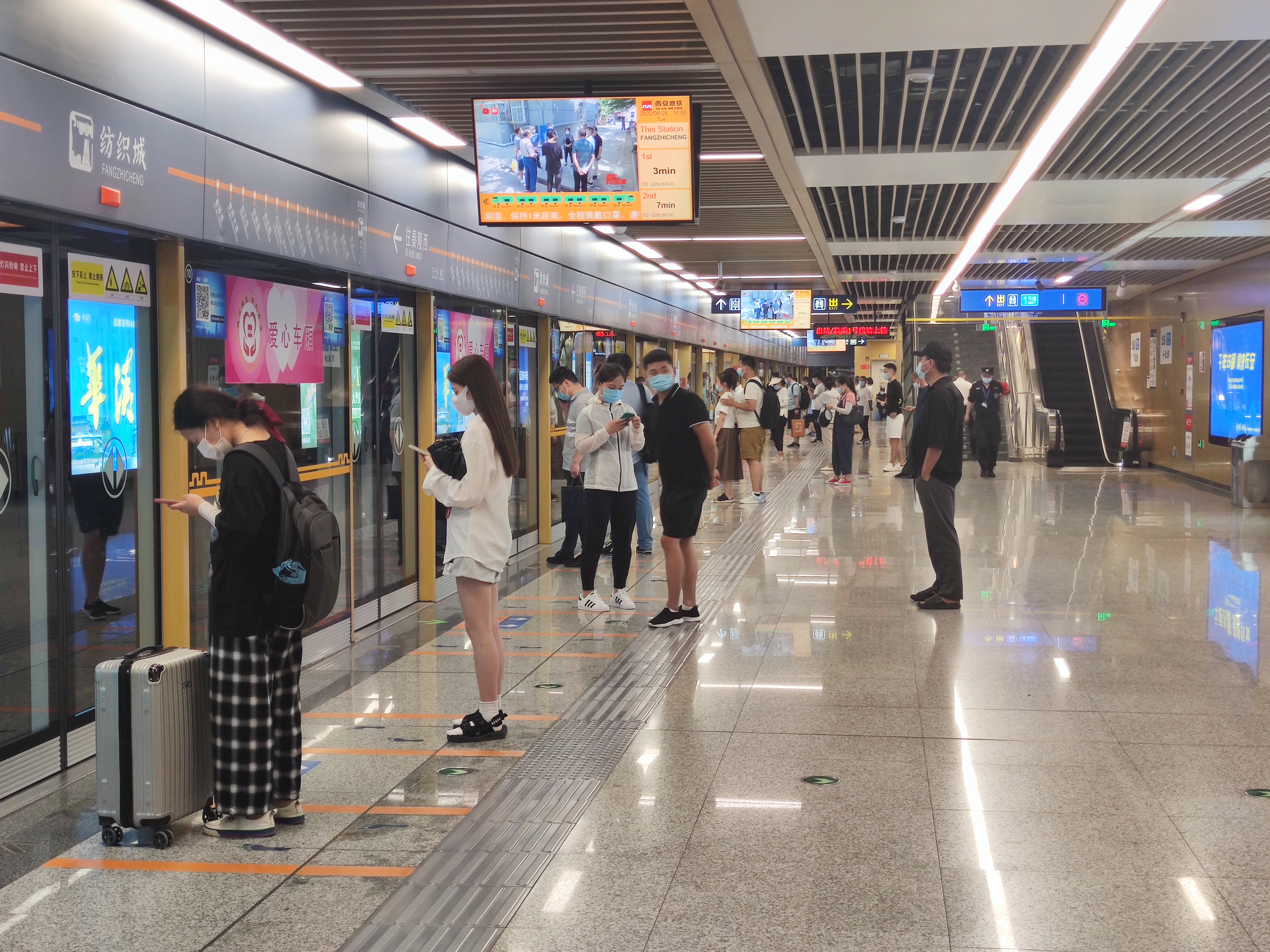
- Line 9 platform

Chinese name
- Traditional Chinese: 紡織城
- Simplified Chinese: 纺织城
Transcriptions
Standard Mandarin
- Hanyu Pinyin: Fǎngzhīchéng
- Wade–Giles: Fang^{3}-chih^{1}-ch‘êng^{2}
- IPA: [fàŋ.ʈʂɨ́.ʈʂʰə̌ŋ]

General information
- Location: Baqiao District, Xi'an, Shaanxi; China
- Coordinates: 34.2786°N 109.0725°E
- Operator: Xi'an Metro Co. Ltd.
- Lines: Line 1 Line 6 Line 9
- Platforms: 6 (2 island platforms, 2 side platforms)

Construction
- Structure type: Underground

History
- Opened: 15 September 2013 (Line 1); 28 December 2020 (Line 9); 29 December 2022 (Line 6)

Services
Preceding station	Xi'an Metro	Following station
Banpo towards Xianyangxizhan	Line 1	Terminus
Fang 2-lu towards Xi'annanzhan	Line 6	Terminus
Terminus	Line 9	Xiangwang towards Qinlingxi
Location

Fangzhicheng station (Chinese: 纺织城站; pinyin: Fǎngzhīchéng zhàn) is a cross-platform interchange station of Line 1, Line 6 and Line 9 of Xi'an Metro. It started operations on 15 September 2013.

== Station layout ==
G	Exits	Exits A–H
L1; Concourse	Lobby	Customer service, ticket machines, ticket gates, Chang'an Card machines, Xi'an Chengdong Passenger Transport Hub lobby
L2; Platforms	Side platform, doors open on the right
L2; Platforms	arrow for L	1 towards Xianyangxizhan (Banpo)
L2; Platforms	arrow for R	1 termination platform
L2; Platforms	Island platform, doors open on the right for 1 , left for 9
L2; Platforms	arrow for R	9 towards Qinlingxi (Xiangwang)
L2; Platforms	arrow for L	9 termination platform
L2; Platforms	Island platform, doors open on the right for 6 , left for 9
L2; Platforms	arrow for L	6 towards Xi'annanzhan (Fang 2-lu)
L2; Platforms	arrow for R	6 termination platform
L2; Platforms	Side platform, doors open on the right

== Exits ==
Designation	Nearly landmarks		Image
A	Xi'an Chengdong Passenger Transport Hub	Liuming Road, Air Force Medical University Tangdu Hospital	
D	Xi'an Chengdong Passenger Transport Hub	Fangwei Road, Puhua Qianshuiwan, Xinxing Ziyingtai, Wyndham Hotel Xi'an	
B	Liuming Road, Xinsi Road, Changle East Road	Xinyi Road	
E	Liuming Road, Xinsi Road, Changle East Road		
C	Fangwei Road, Changle East Road		
H	Fangwei Road, Changle East Road		
F	Changle East Road, Liuming Road		
G	Changle East Road, Fangwei Road		
