= Hanchenglu station =

Metro station in Xi'an, China

Coordinates: 34.27462°N 108.86908°E

Hancheng Lu 汉城路
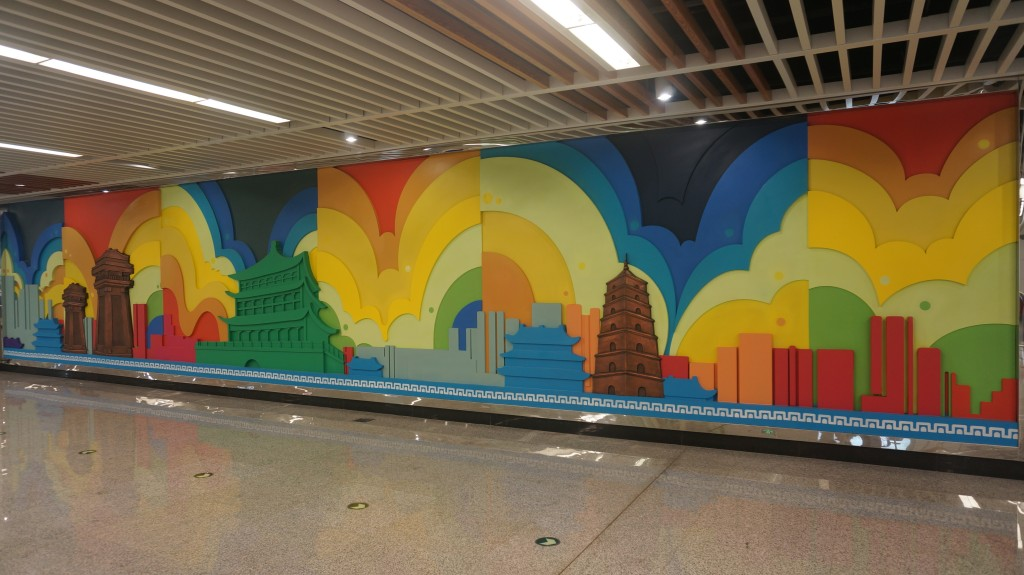

General information
- Location: Lianhu District, Xi'an, Shaanxi; China
- Operated by: Xi'an Metro Co. Ltd.
- Line: Line 1
- Platforms: 2 (1 island platform)

Construction
- Structure type: Underground

History
- Opened: 15 September 2013

Services
Preceding station	Xi'an Metro	Following station
Zaoyuan towards Xianyangxizhan	Line 1	Kaiyuanmen towards Fangzhicheng
Location

Hancheng Lu station (Chinese: 汉城路站) is a station of Line 1 of the Xi'an Metro. It started operations on 15 September 2013.
