= Wanshoulu station =

Wanshoulu station may refer to:

- Wanshou Lu station, in Beijing, China
- Wanshoulu station (Xi'an Metro), in Xi'an, Shaanxi Province, China
- Wanshoulu station (Chongqing Rail Transit), in Chongqing, China, on Line 10
