= Zaoyuan station =

Zaoyuan Station can refer to:

- Zaoyuan station (Beijing Subway), a metro station in Beijing, China
- Zaoyuan station (Xi'an Metro), a metro station in Xi'an, China
