= Sajinqiao station =

Metro station in Xi'an, China

Coordinates: 34.2713°N 108.9288°E

Sajinqiao 洒金桥
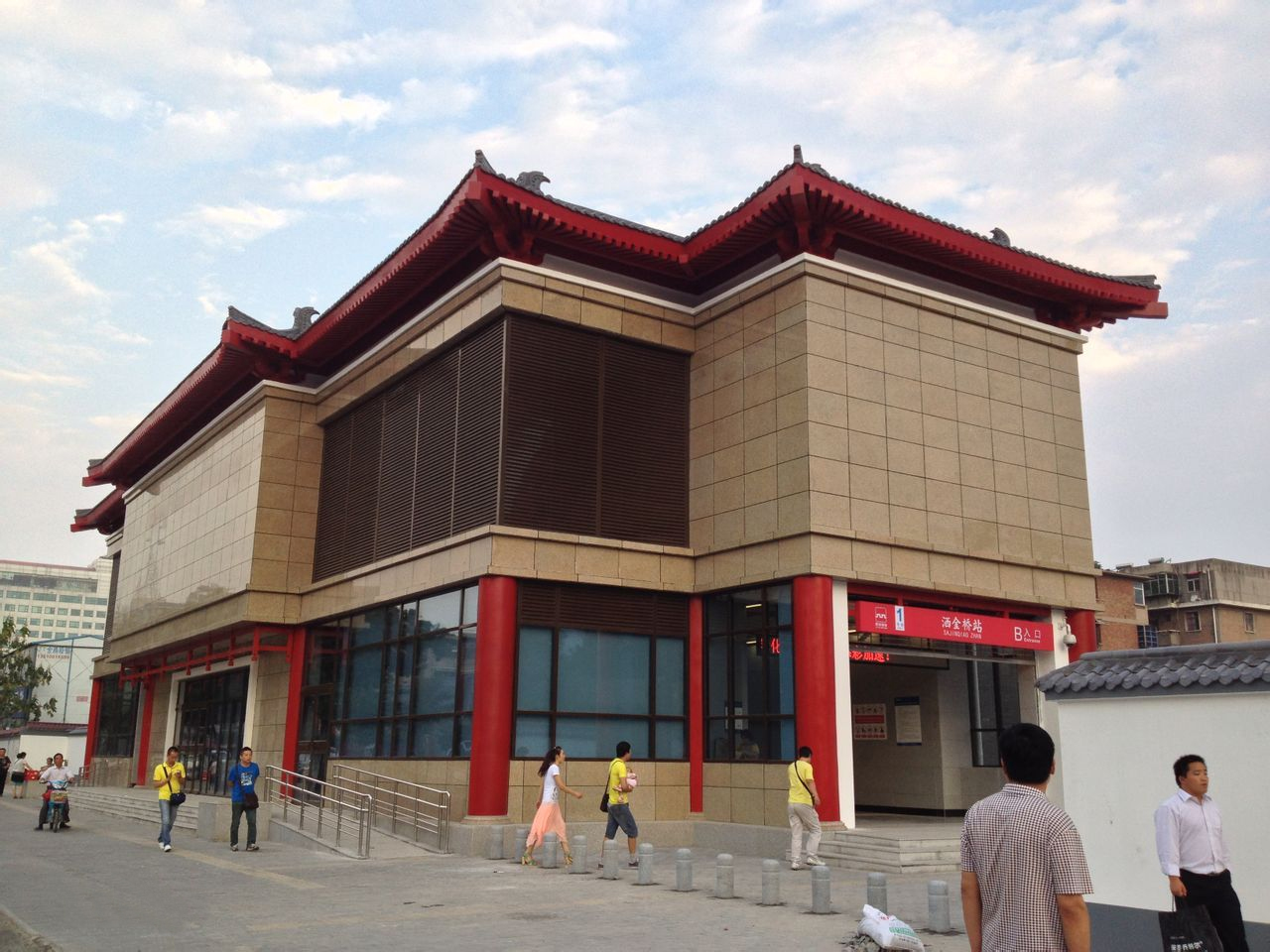

General information
- Location: Lianhu District, Xi'an, Shaanxi; China
- Operated by: Xi'an Metro Co. Ltd.
- Line: Line 1
- Platforms: 2 (1 island platform)

Construction
- Structure type: Underground

History
- Opened: 15 September 2013

Services
| Preceding station | Xi'an Metro | Following station |
|---|---|---|
| Yuxiangmen towards Xianyangxizhan | Line 1 | Beidajie towards Fangzhicheng |
Location

Sajinqiao station (Chinese: 洒金桥站) is a station of Line 1 of the Xi'an Metro. It started operations on 15 September 2013.

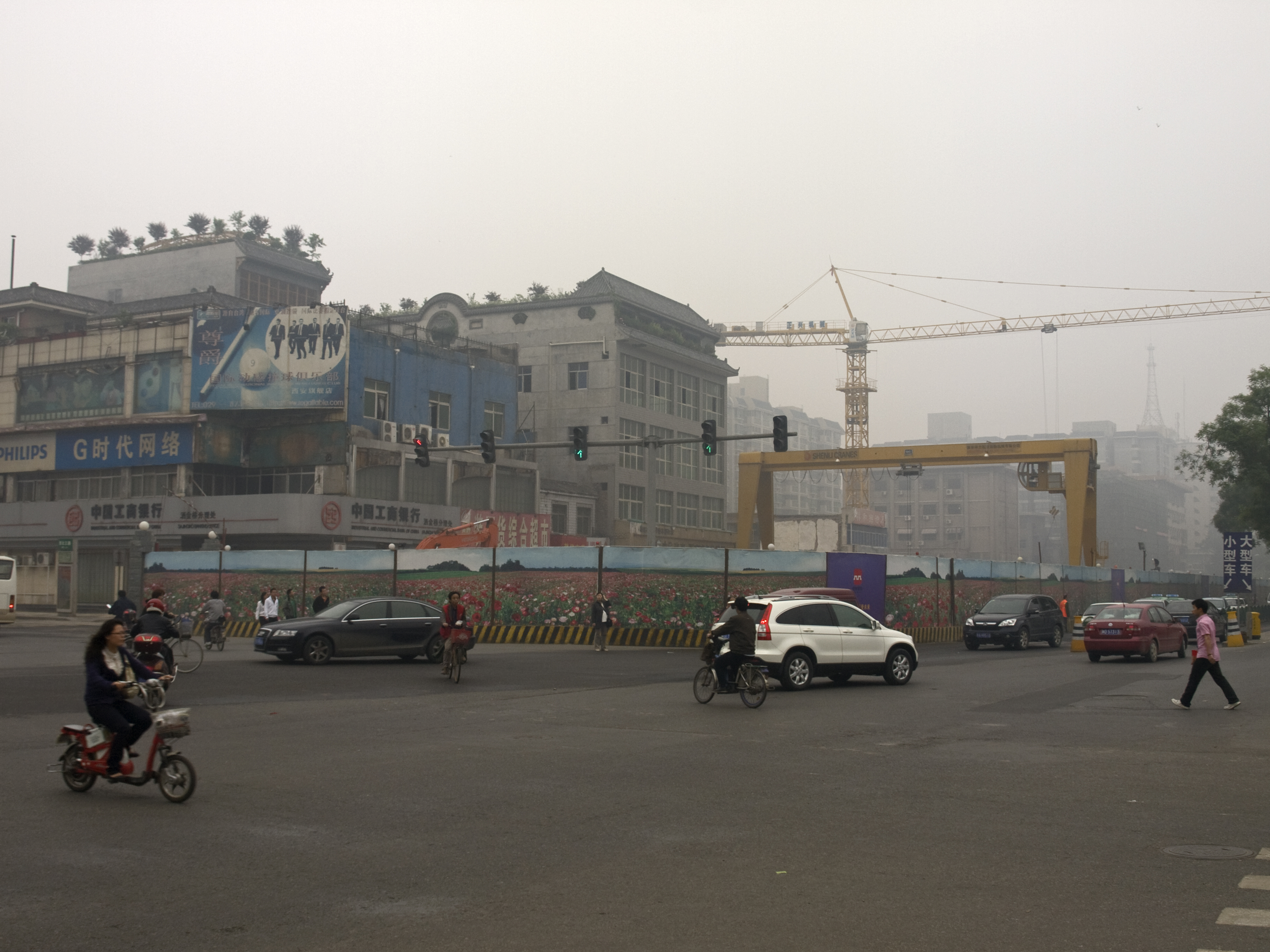
The construction of the station
