= Beidajie station =

Metro station in Xi'an, China

Beidajie 北大街
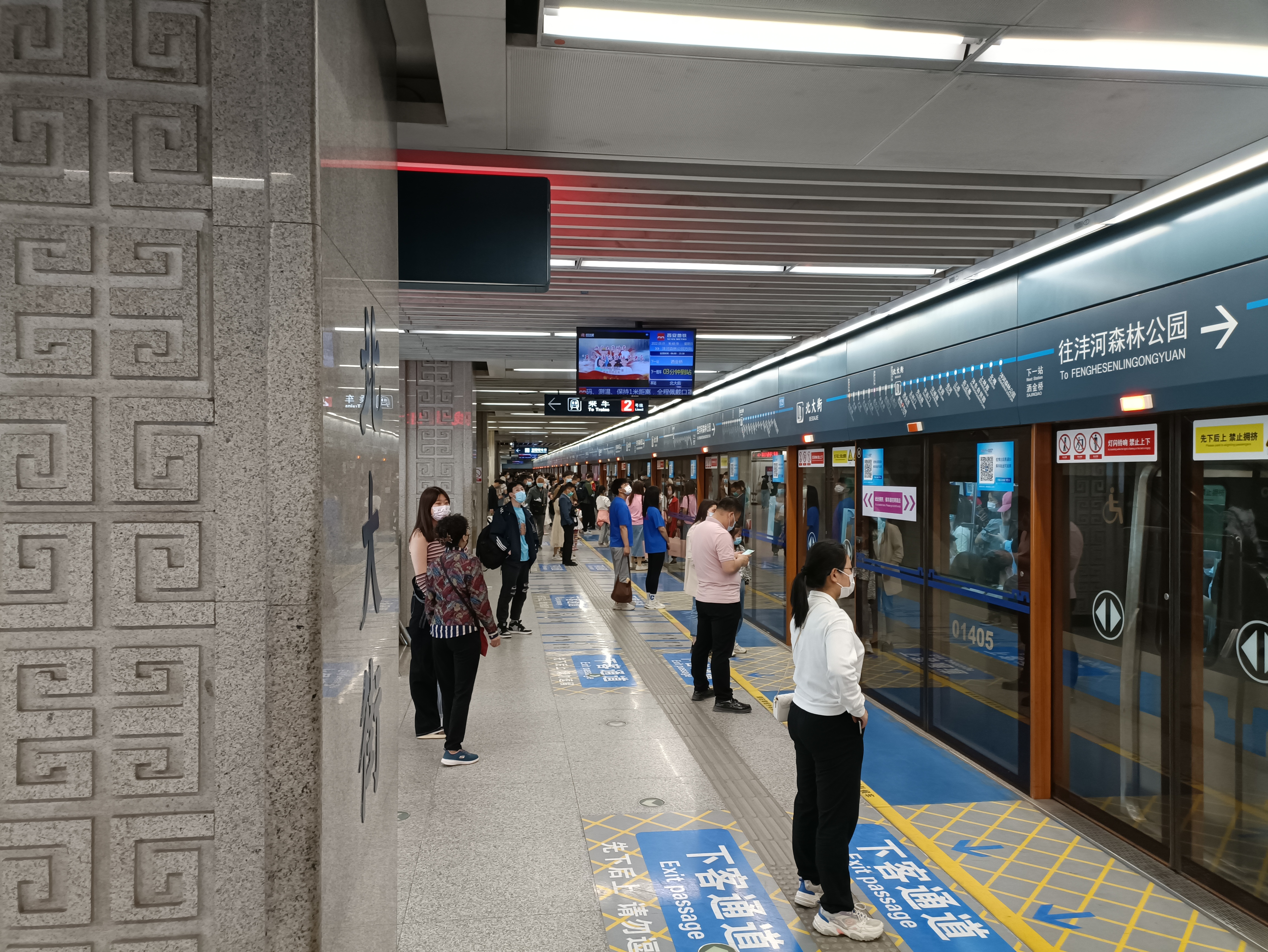
- Line 1 platform

General information
- Location: Lianhu Road, Xiwu Road and Beidajie Street (North Street); Xincheng District, Xi'an, Shaanxi; China
- Coordinates: 34°16′17″N 108°56′33″E
- Operated by: Xi'an Metro Co. Ltd.
- Lines: Line 1; Line 2
- Platforms: 4 (1 island platform, 2 side platforms)

Construction
- Structure type: Underground

History
- Opened: 16 September 2011 (Line 2); 15 September 2013 (Line 1)

Services
Preceding station	Xi'an Metro	Following station
Sajinqiao towards Xianyangxizhan	Line 1	Wulukou towards Fangzhicheng
Anyuanmen towards Caotan	Line 2	Zhonglou towards Changninggong
Location

Beidajie station (Chinese: 北大街站) is a station of Line 1 and Line 2 of the Xi'an Metro. It started operations on 16 September 2011. The station is the first interchange station of the Xi'an Metro.

== Gallery ==
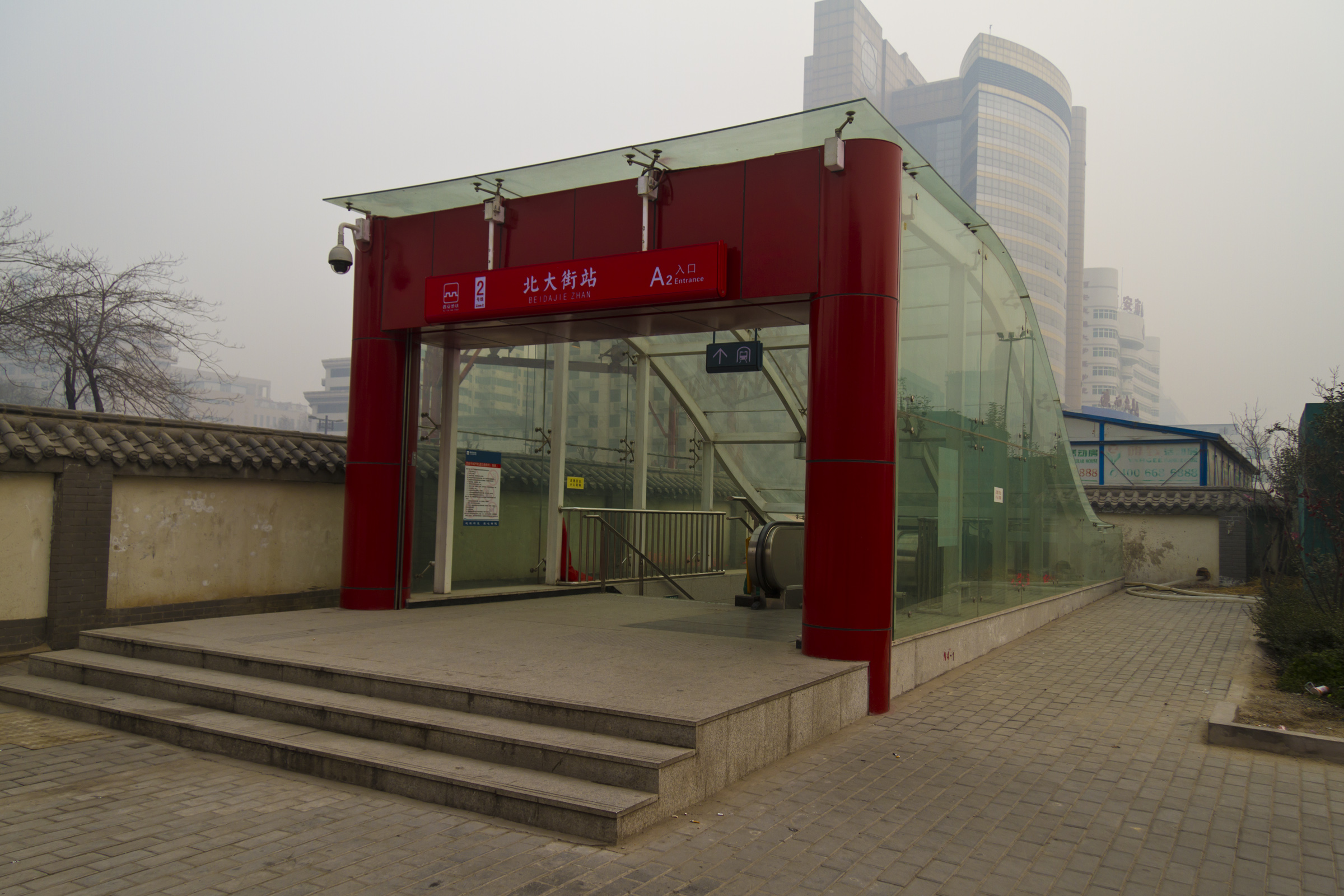
Entrance A2

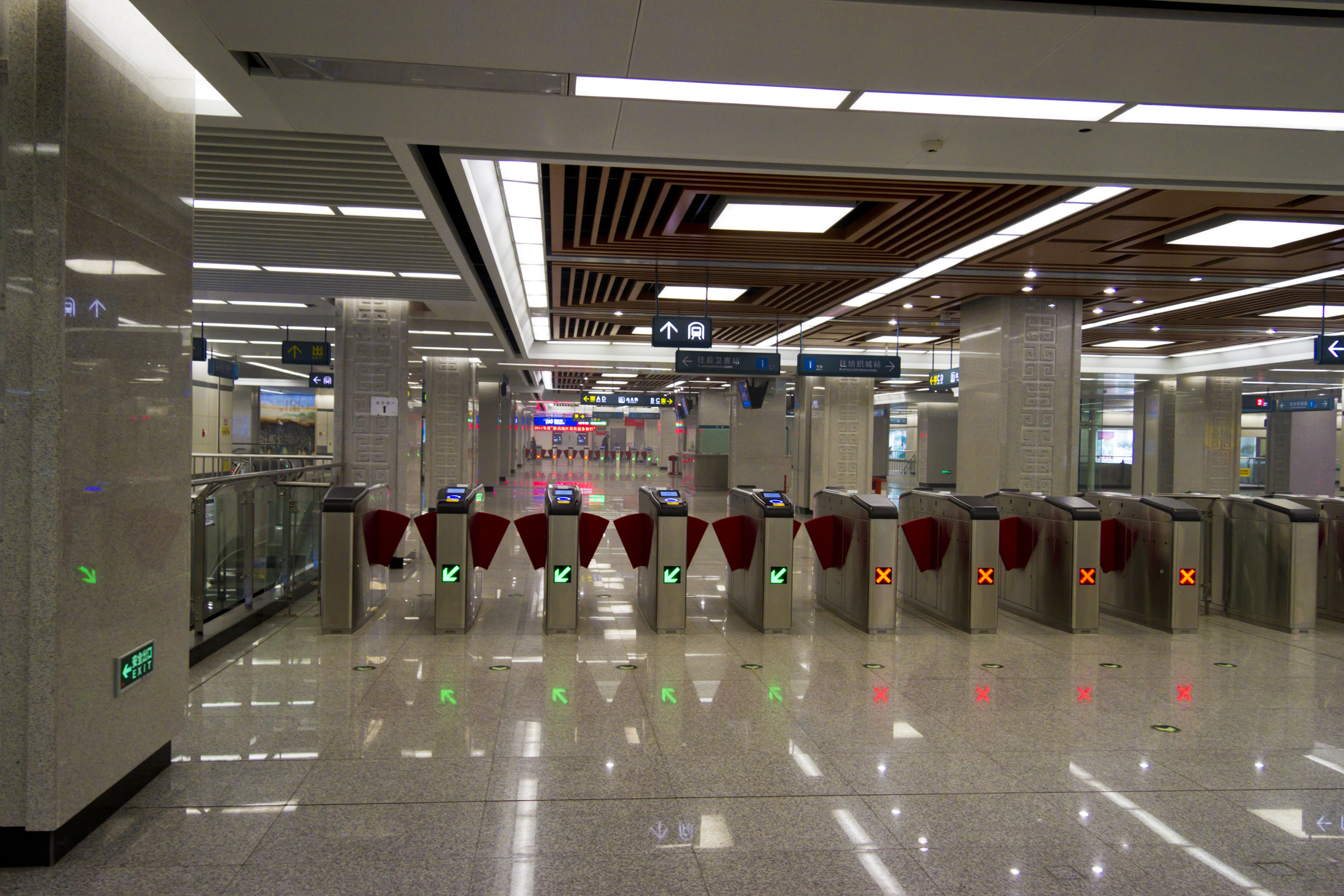
Concourse

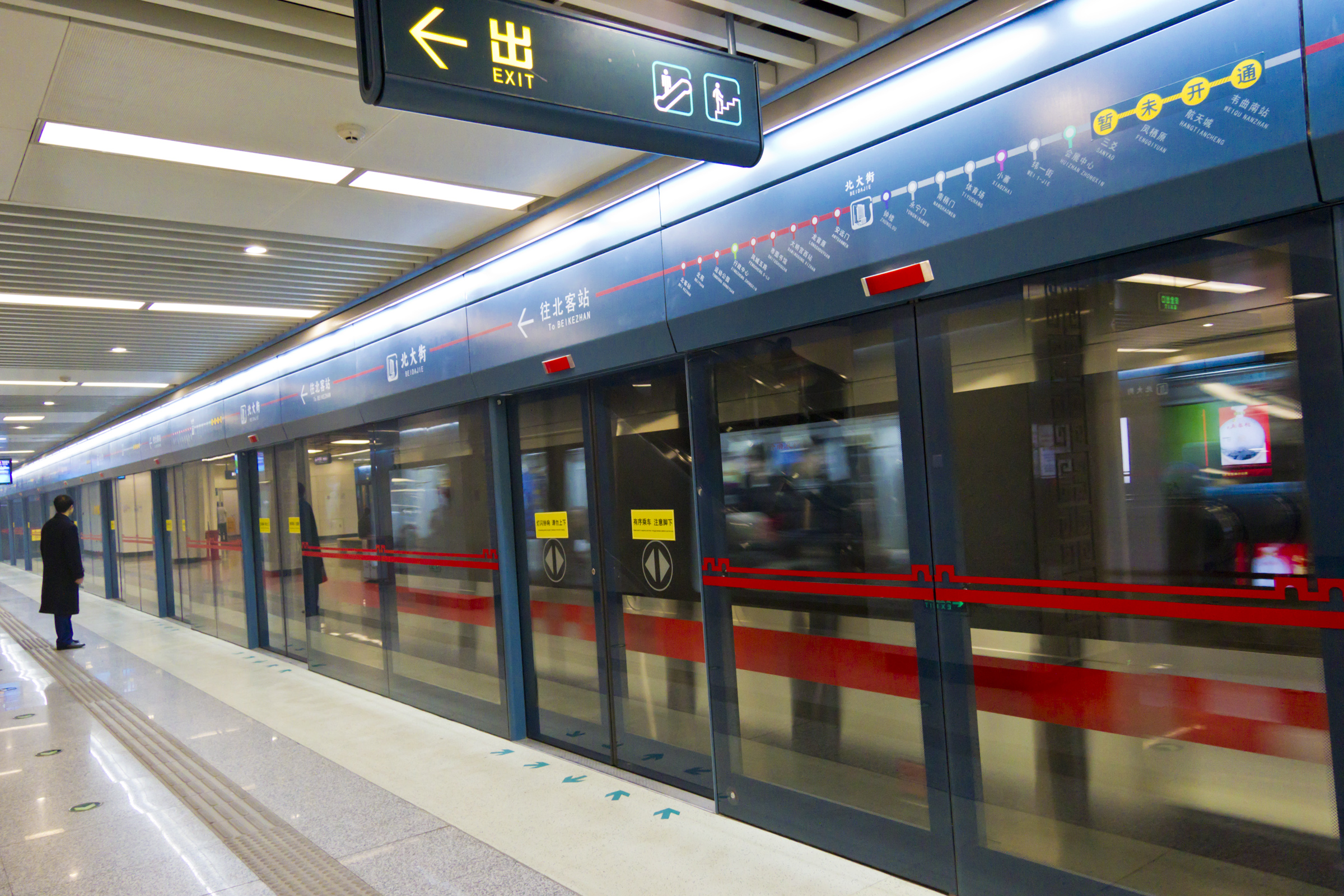
Line 2 platform
