= Chaoyangmen station =

Chaoyangmen Station can refer to:

- Chaoyangmen station (Beijing Subway), a metro station in Beijing, China
- Chaoyangmen station (Xi'an Metro), a metro station in Xi'an, China
