= Kangfulu station =

Metro station in Xi'an, China

Kangfu Lu 康复路
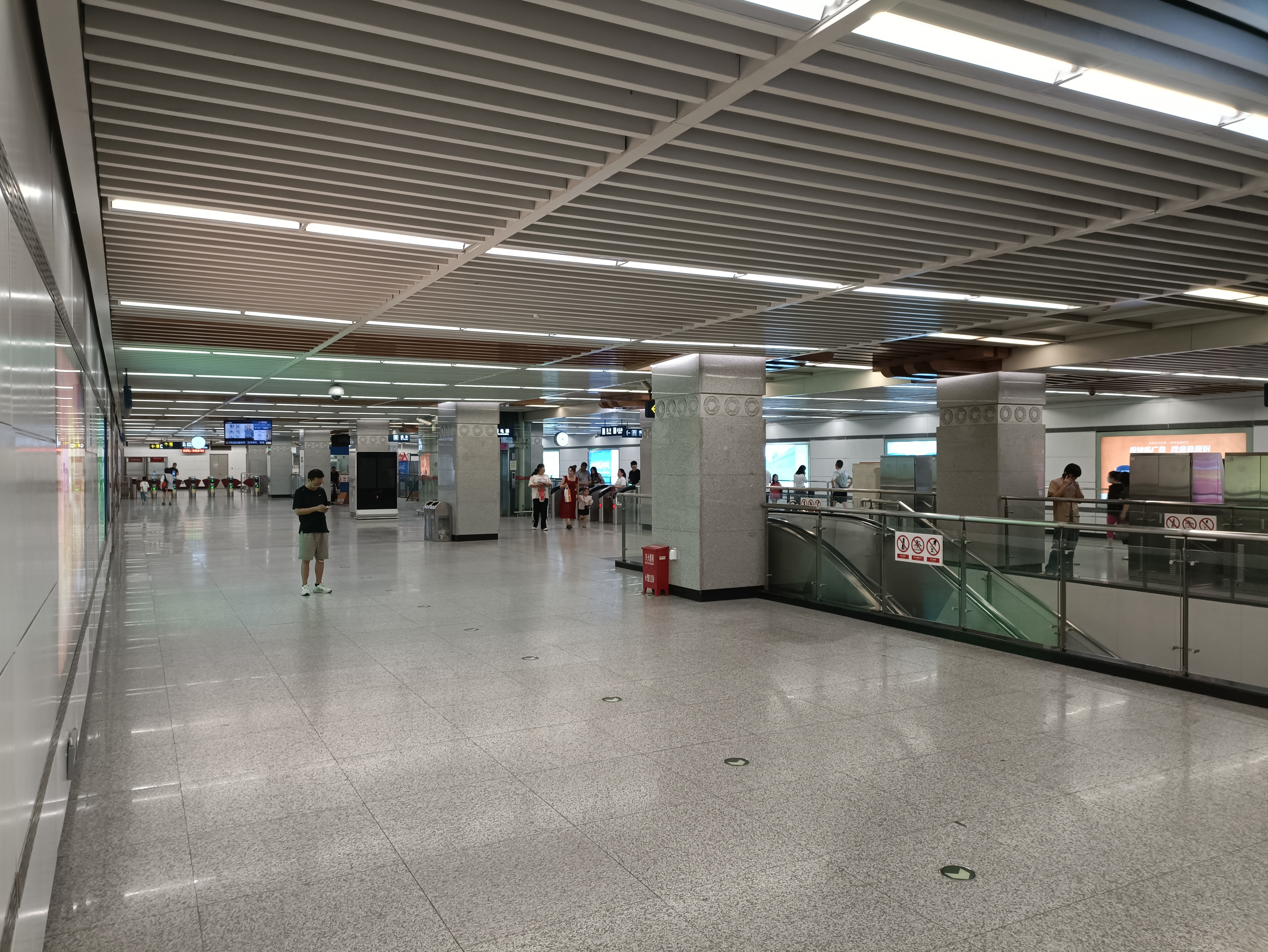
- Concourse

General information
- Location: Xincheng District, Xi'an, Shaanxi; China
- Coordinates: 34.2710°N 108.9796°E
- Operated by: Xi'an Metro Co. Ltd.
- Line: Line 1
- Platforms: 2 (1 island platform)

Construction
- Structure type: Underground

History
- Opened: 15 September 2013

Services
Preceding station	Xi'an Metro	Following station
Chaoyangmen towards Xianyangxizhan	Line 1	Tonghuamen towards Fangzhicheng
Location

Kangfu Lu station (Chinese: 康复路站) is a station of Line 1 of the Xi'an Metro. It started operations on 15 September 2013.
