= Yuxiangmen station =

Metro station in Xi'an, China

Yuxiangmen 玉祥门
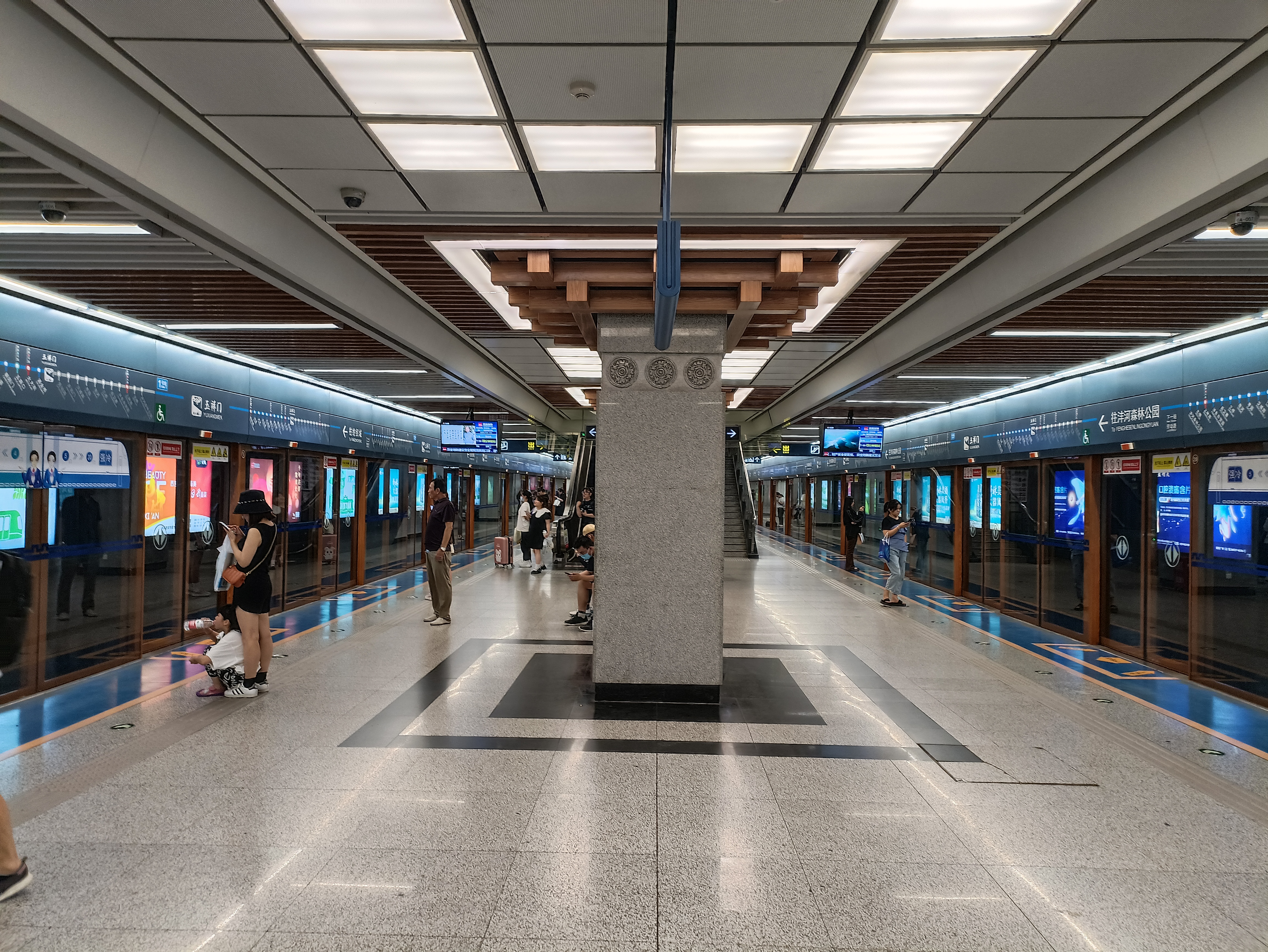

General information
- Location: Lianhu District, Xi'an, Shaanxi; China
- Coordinates: 34.27117°N 108.91651°E
- Operated by: Xi'an Metro Co. Ltd.
- Line: Line 1
- Platforms: 2 (1 island platform)

Construction
- Structure type: Underground

History
- Opened: 15 September 2013

Services
Preceding station	Xi'an Metro	Following station
Laodong Lu towards Xianyangxizhan	Line 1	Sajinqiao towards Fangzhicheng
Location

Yuxiangmen station (Chinese: 玉祥门站) is a station of Line 1 of the Xi'an Metro. It started operations on 15 September 2013.
