= Tonghuamen station =

Metro station in Xi'an, China

Tonghuamen 通化门
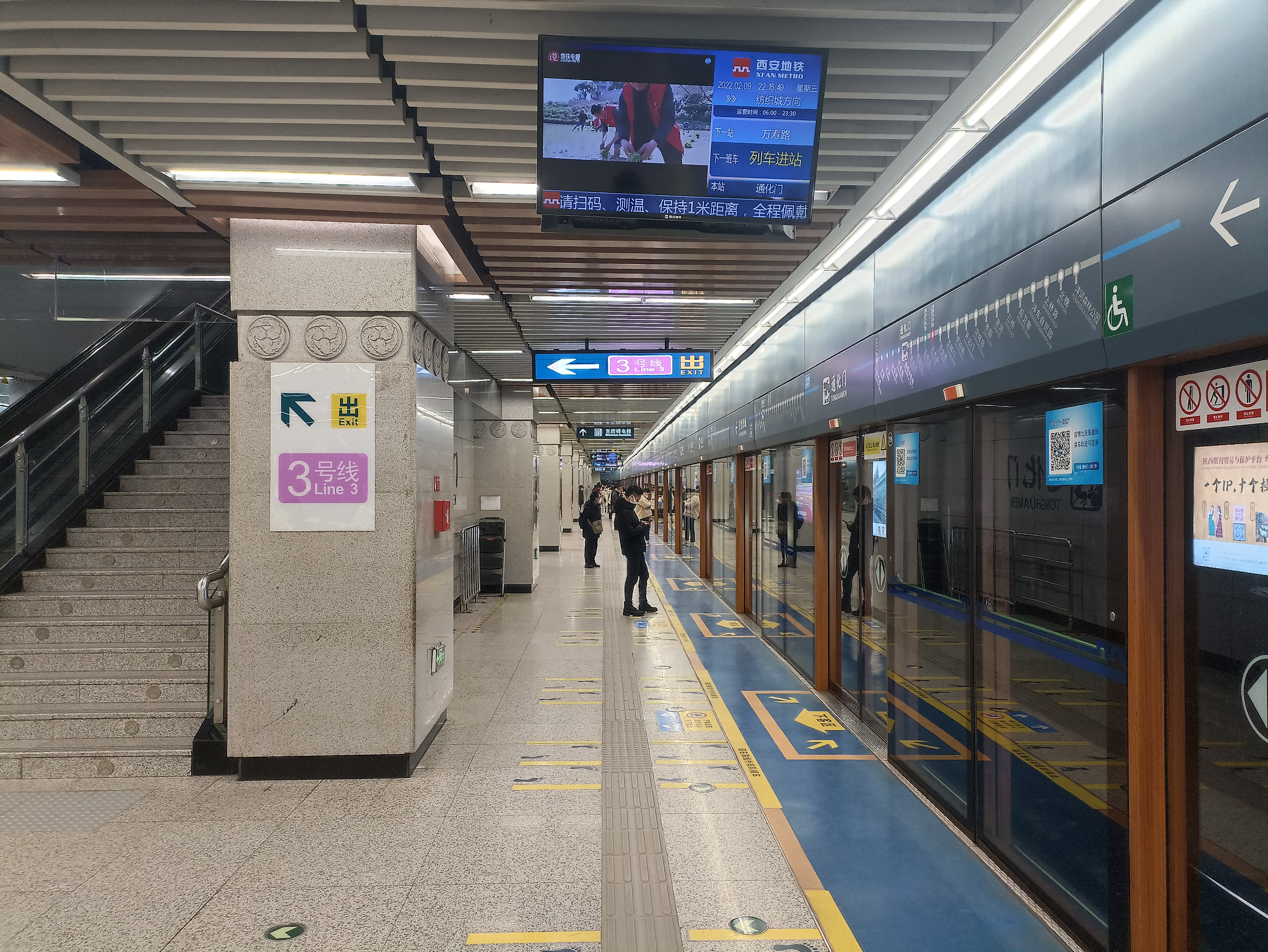
- Line 1 platform

General information
- Location: Xincheng District, Xi'an, Shaanxi; China
- Operated by: Xi'an Metro Co. Ltd.
- Lines: Line 1 Line 3
- Platforms: 4 (2 island platforms)

Construction
- Structure type: Underground

History
- Opened: 15 September 2013 (Line 1); 8 November 2016 (Line 3)

Services
| Preceding station | Xi'an Metro | Following station |
|---|---|---|
| Kangfu Lu towards Xianyangxizhan | Line 1 | Wanshoulu towards Fangzhicheng |
| Changle Gongyuan towards Yuhuazhai | Line 3 | Hujiamiao towards Baoshuiqu |
Location

Tonghuamen station (Chinese: 通化门站) is a station of Line 1 and Line 3 of the Xi'an Metro. It started operations on 15 September 2013.

== Gallery ==
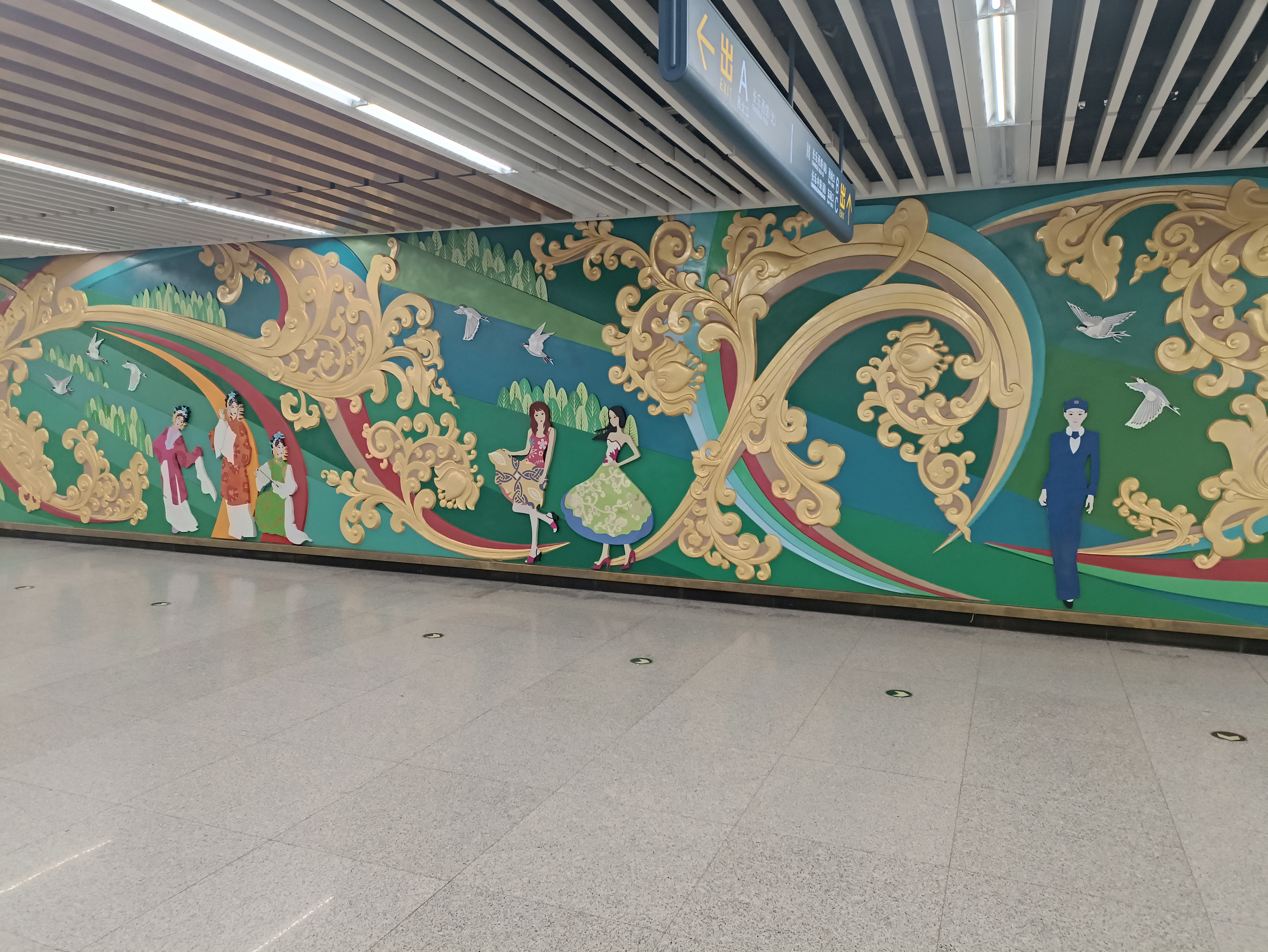
Artwork

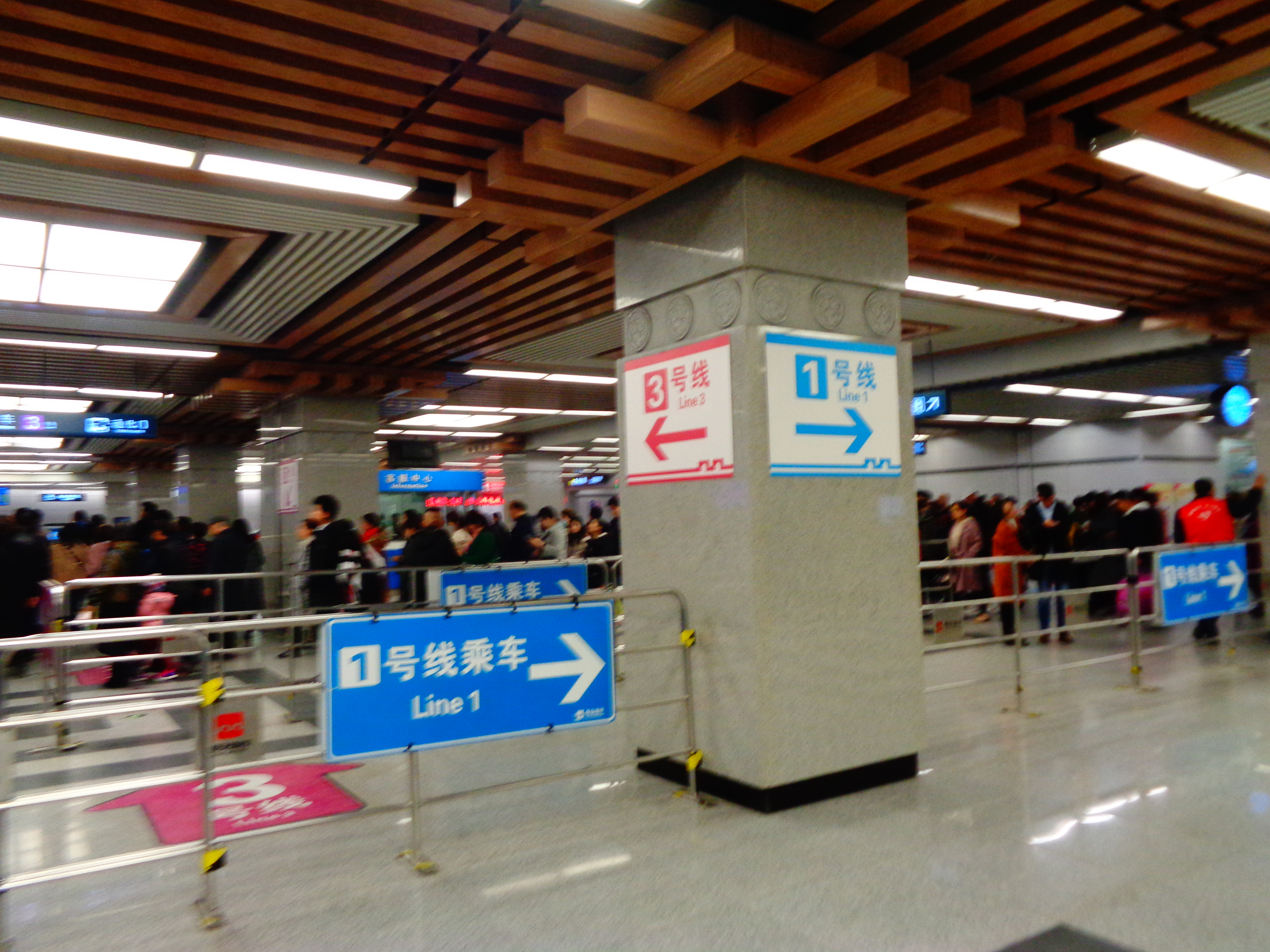
Concourse

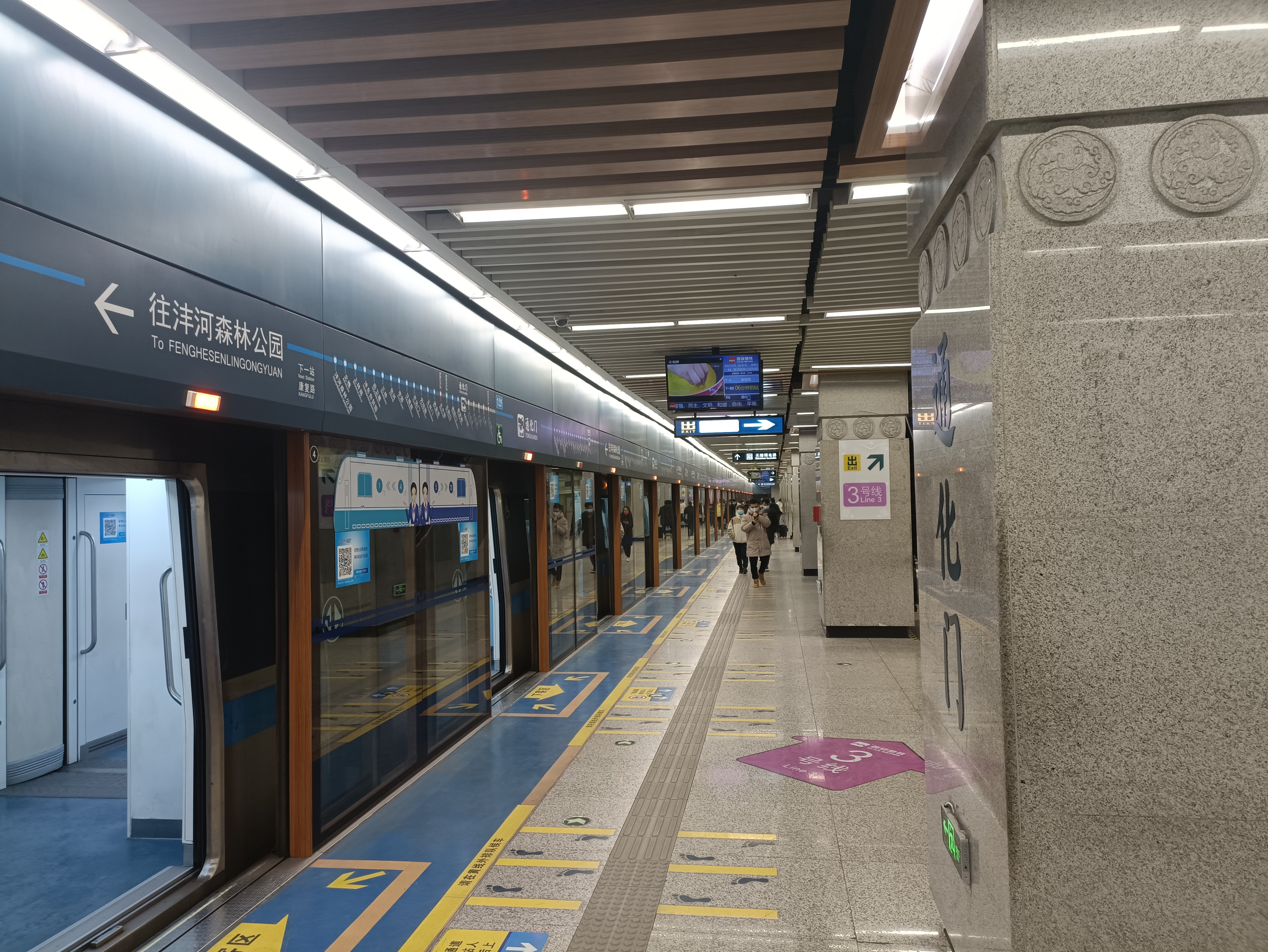
Line 1 platform

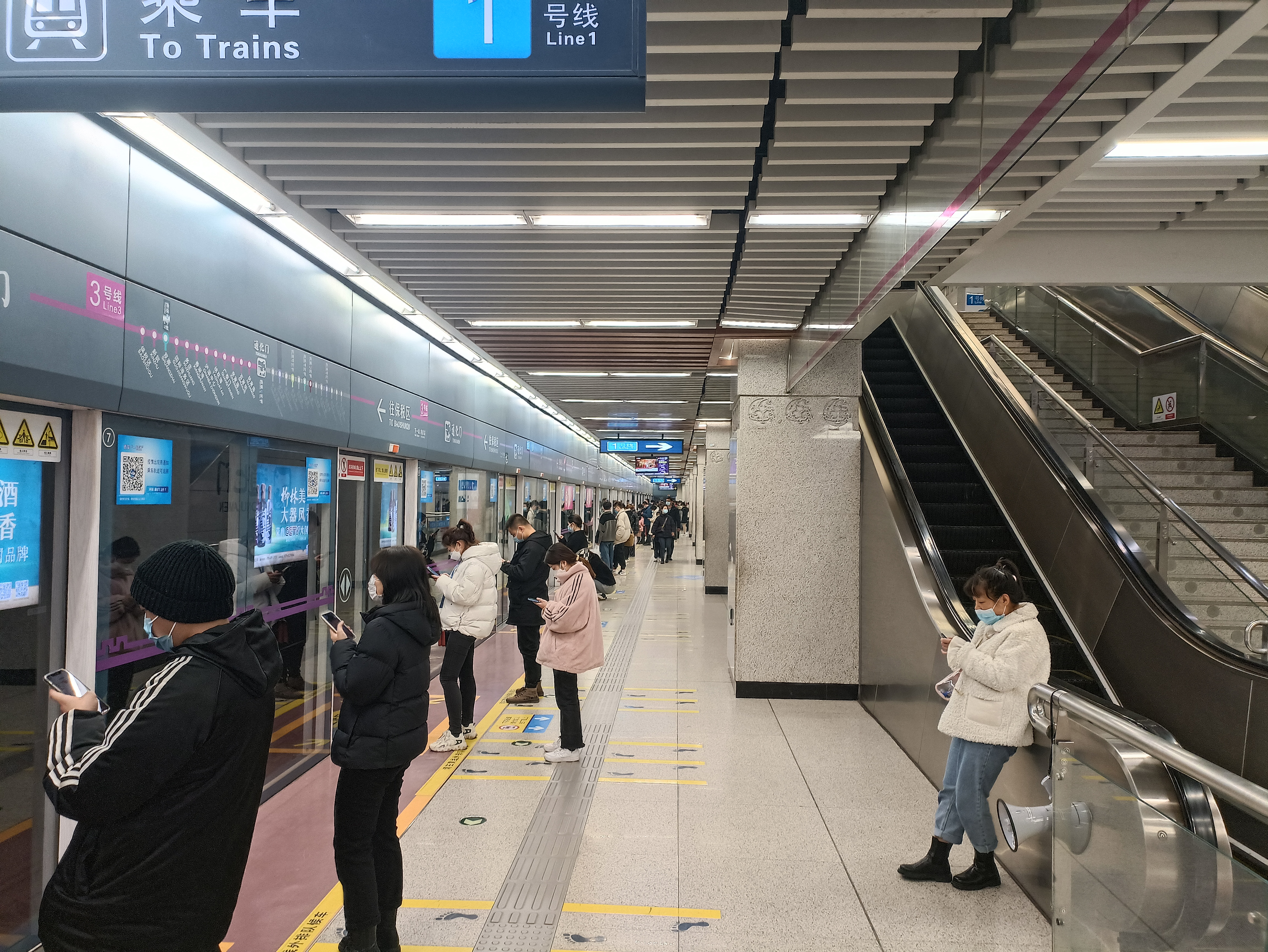
Line 3 platform
