= Chanhe station =

Metro station in Xi'an, China

Chanhe 浐河
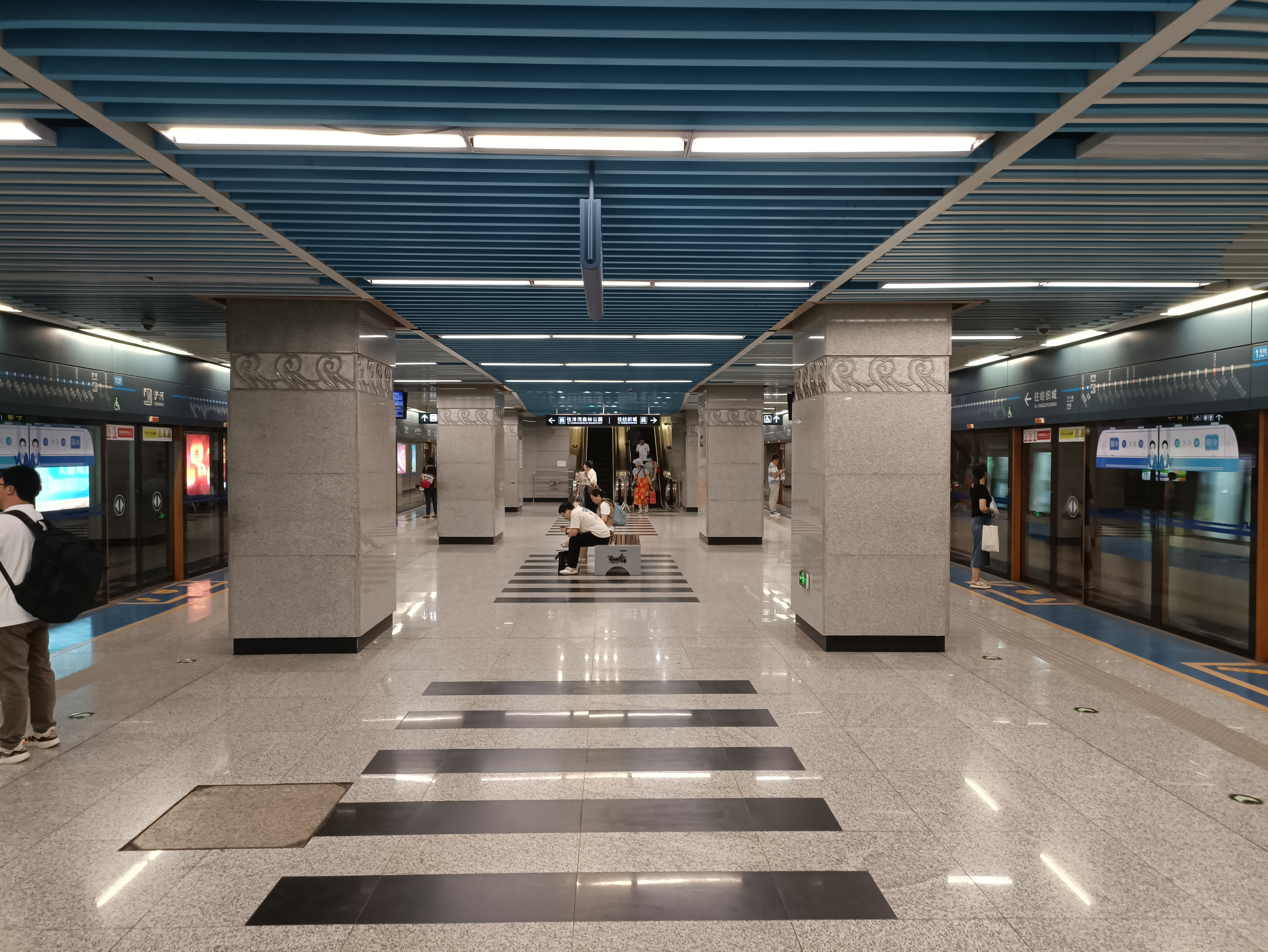

General information
- Location: Baqiao District, Xi'an, Shaanxi; China
- Operated by: Xi'an Metro Co. Ltd.
- Line: Line 1
- Platforms: 2 (1 island platform)

Construction
- Structure type: Underground

History
- Opened: 15 September 2013

Services
| Preceding station | Xi'an Metro | Following station |
|---|---|---|
| Changlepo towards Xianyangxizhan | Line 1 | Banpo towards Fangzhicheng |
Location

Chanhe station (Chinese: 浐河站) is a station of Line 1 of the Xi'an Metro. It started operations on 15 September 2013.
