= Wulukou station =

Metro station in Xi'an, China

Wulukou 五路口
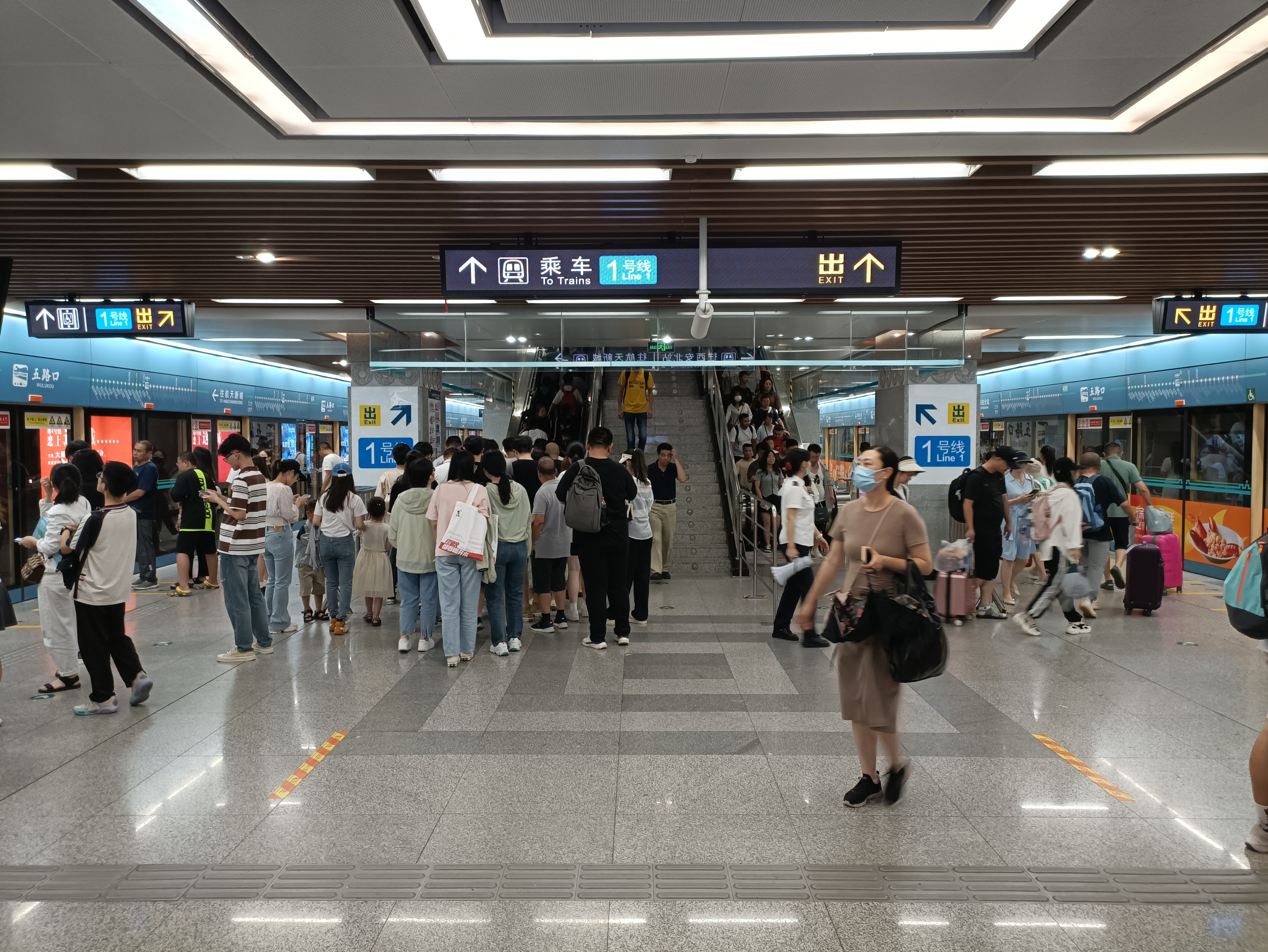
- Line 4 platform

General information
- Location: Jiefang Road, Xincheng District, Xi'an, Shaanxi; China
- Coordinates: 34°16′18.6″N 108°57′31.8″E
- Operated by: Xi'an Metro Co. Ltd.
- Lines: Line 1 Line 4
- Platforms: 4 (2 island platforms)

Construction
- Structure type: Underground

History
- Opened: 15 September 2013 (Line 1); 26 December 2018 (Line 4)

Services
Preceding station	Xi'an Metro	Following station
Beidajie towards Xianyangxizhan	Line 1	Chaoyangmen towards Fangzhicheng
Xi'anzhan towards Xi'an Beizhan	Line 4	Dachaishi towards Hangtianxincheng
Location

Wulukou station (Chinese: 五路口站; pinyin: Wǔlùkǒu zhàn) is an interchange station of Line 1 and Line 4 of the Xi'an Metro. It started operations on 15 September 2013.
