= Wanshoulu station (Xi'an Metro) =

Metro station in Xi'an, China

Wanshoulu 万寿路
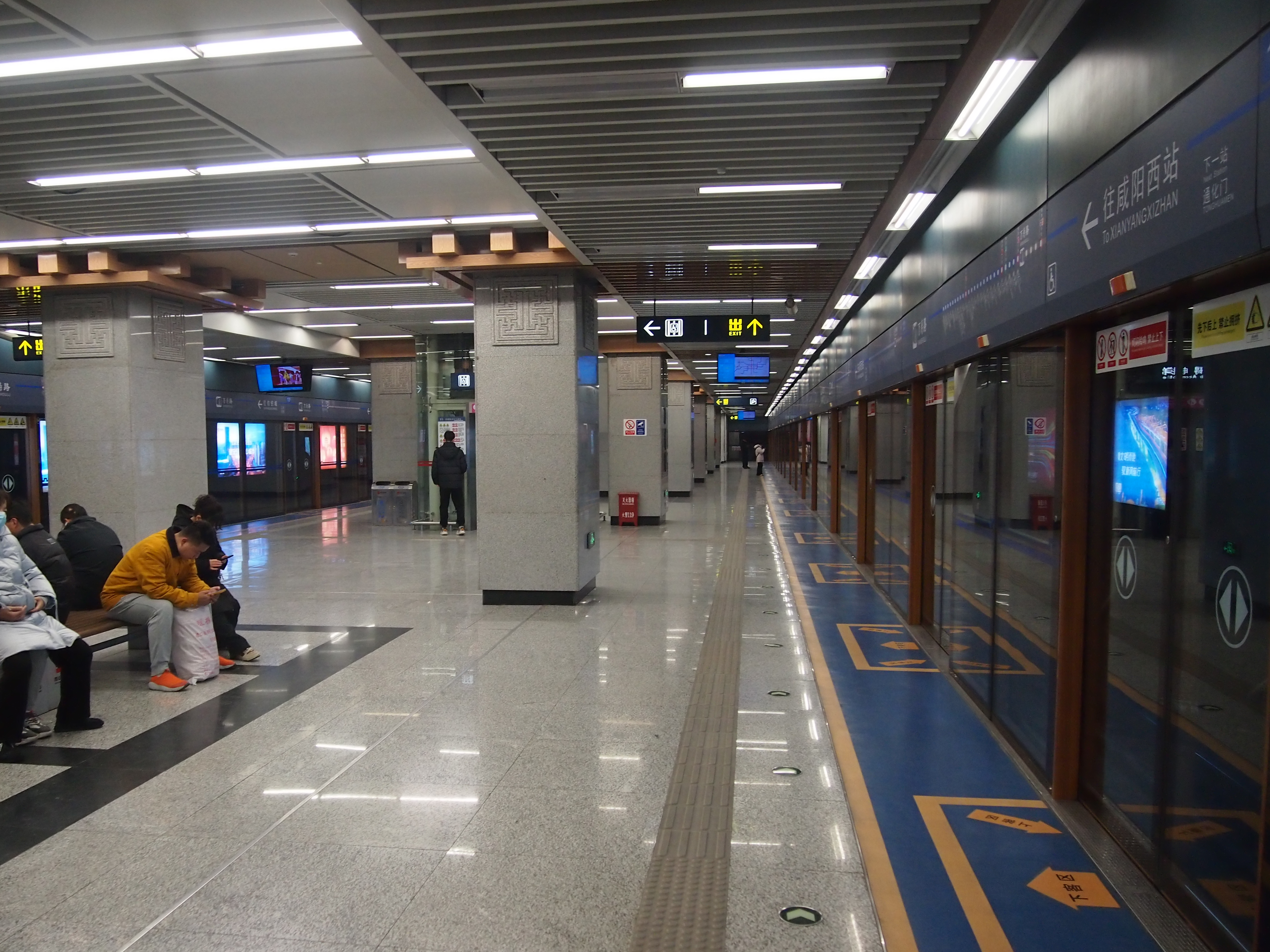
- Line 1 platform

General information
- Location: Xincheng District, Xi'an, Shaanxi; China
- Operated by: Xi'an Metro Co. Ltd.
- Lines: Line 1 Line 8
- Platforms: 4 (2 island platforms)

Construction
- Structure type: Underground

History
- Opened: 15 September 2013 (Line 1); 26 December 2024 (Line 8)

Services
Preceding station	Xi'an Metro	Following station
Tonghuamen towards Xianyangxizhan	Line 1	Changlepo towards Fangzhicheng
Hansenzhai Clockwise	Line 8	Xingfulindaibei Counter-clockwise
Location

Wanshoulu station (Chinese: 万寿路站) is a station of Line 1 and Line 8 of the Xi'an Metro. Line 1 started operations on 15 September 2013. Line 8 started operations on 26 December 2024.
