= Chaoyangmen station (Xi'an Metro) =

Metro station in Xi'an, China

Chaoyangmen 朝阳门
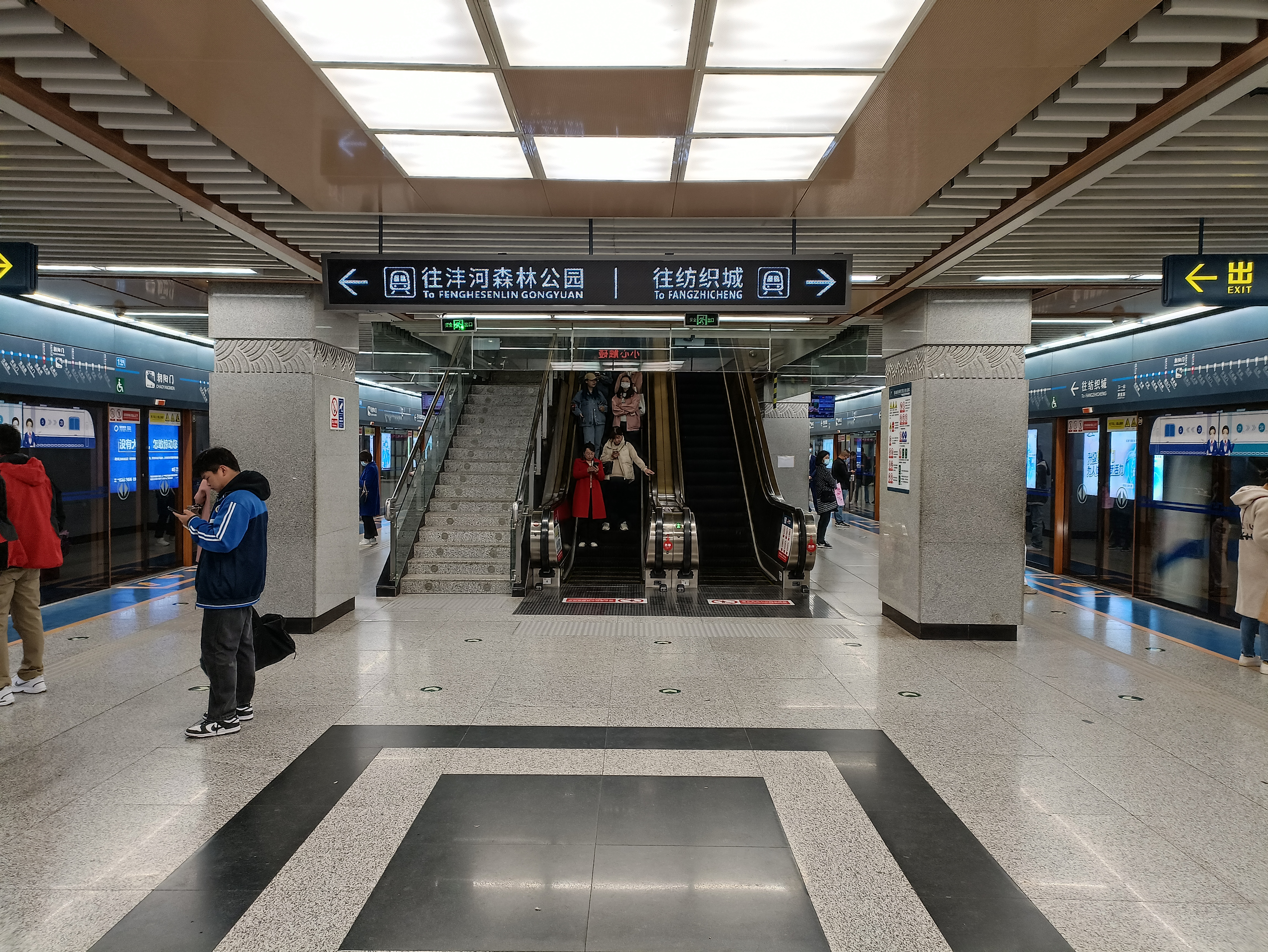

General information
- Location: Xincheng District, Xi'an, Shaanxi; China
- Coordinates: 34.27149°N 108.96903°E
- Operated by: Xi'an Metro Co. Ltd.
- Line: Line 1
- Platforms: 2 (1 island platform)

Construction
- Structure type: Underground

History
- Opened: 15 September 2013

Services
Preceding station	Xi'an Metro	Following station
Wulukou towards Xianyangxizhan	Line 1	Kangfu Lu towards Fangzhicheng
Location

Chaoyangmen station (Chinese: 朝阳门站) is a station of Line 1 of the Xi'an Metro. It started operations on 15 September 2013.
