= Line 1 (Xi'an Metro) =

Metro line in Xi'an, China

- 1
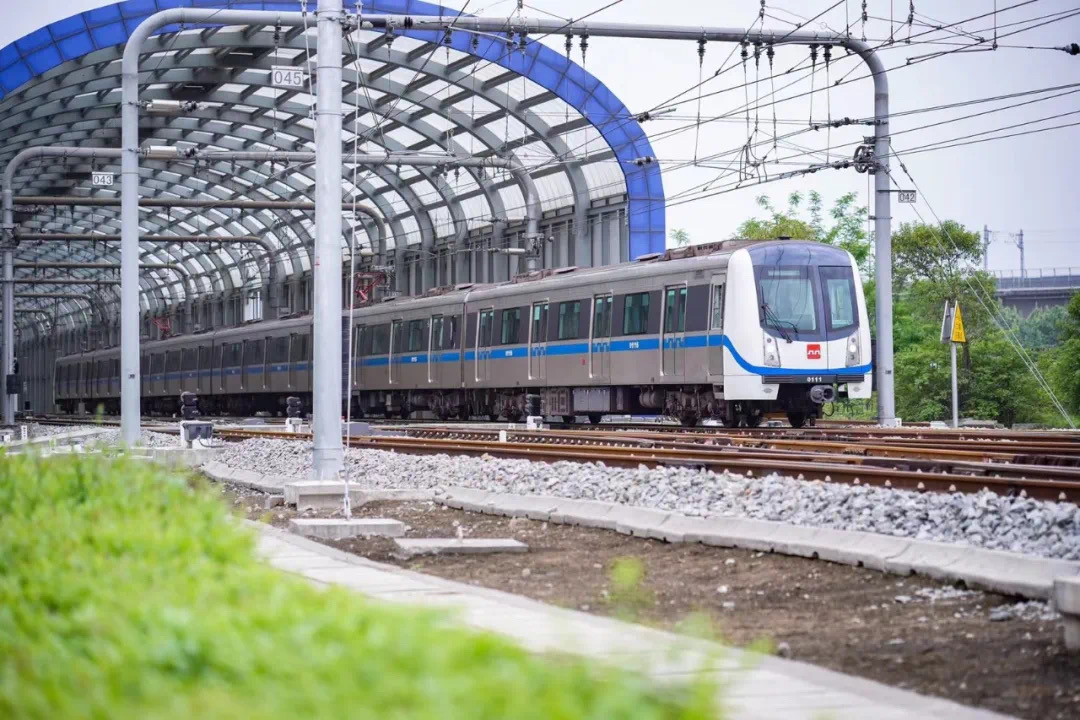
- Train of Line 1

Overview
- Status: Operational
- Owner: Xi'an
- Locale: Xi'an and Xianyang, Shaanxi
- Termini: Xianyangxizhan; Fangzhicheng
- Stations: 30

Service
- Type: Rapid transit
- System: Xi'an Metro
- Services: 1
- Operator: Xi'an Metro Corporation
- Daily ridership: 933,340 (2021 record)

History
- Opened: 15 September 2013; 13 years ago

Technical
- Line length: 42.2 km (26.2 mi)
- Number of tracks: 2
- Character: Underground
- Track gauge: 1,435 mm (4 ft 8 1/2 in)

Line 1 of the Xi'an Metro (Chinese: 西安地铁一号线; pinyin: Xī'ān Dìtiě Yī Hào Xiàn) is a rapid transit line running from west to east Xi'an. It was opened on 15 September 2013. Currently, this line measured 42 km (26 mi) long with 30 stations. The line is colored blue on system maps.

== Opening timeline ==
Segment	Commencement	Length	Station(s)	Name
Houweizhai — Fangzhicheng	15 September 2013	25.36 km (15.76 mi)	19	Phase 1
Fenghesenlingongyuan — Houweizhai	26 September 2019	6.093 km (3.79 mi)	4	Phase 2
Fenghesenlingongyuan — Xianyangxizhan	21 September 2023	10.61 km (6.59 mi)	7	Phase 3

== Stations (west to east) ==
Station name		Connections	Distance km		Location	
English	Chinese	Connections	Distance km		Location	
Xianyangxizhan	咸阳西站	XOY			Qindu	Xianyang
Baoquanlu	宝泉路				Qindu	Xianyang
Zhonghuaxilu	中华西路				Qindu	Xianyang
Angu	安谷				Qindu	Xianyang
Chenyangzhai	陈杨寨				Qindu	Xianyang
Baimahe	白马河				Qindu	Xianyang
Shaanxi Zhongyiyao Daxue	陕西中医药大学				Qindu	Xianyang
Fenghesenlingongyuan	沣河森林公园				Qindu	Xianyang
Beihuai	北槐				Qindu	Xianyang
Shanglinlu	上林路	16			Qindu	Xianyang
Fengdongzimaoyuan	沣东自贸园				Qindu	Xianyang
Houweizhai	后卫寨		0.000	0.000	Weiyang	Xi'an
Sanqiao	三桥		2.014	2.014	Weiyang	Xi'an
Zaohe	皂河		2.073	4.087	Weiyang	Xi'an
Zaoyuan	枣园		1.044	5.131	Lianhu	Xi'an
Hancheng Lu	汉城路		1.256	6.387	Lianhu	Xi'an
Kaiyuanmen	开远门	8	1.850	8.237	Lianhu	Xi'an
Laodong Lu	劳动路		1.582	9.820	Lianhu	Xi'an
Yuxiangmen	玉祥门		1.000	10.820	Lianhu	Xi'an
Sajinqiao	洒金桥		1.214	12.034	Lianhu	Xi'an
Beidajie	北大街	2	1.224	13.258	Lianhu	Xi'an
Wulukou	五路口	4	1.444	14.702	Xincheng	Xi'an
Chaoyangmen	朝阳门		1.032	15.734	Xincheng	Xi'an
Kangfu Lu	康复路		0.915	16.649	Xincheng	Xi'an
Tonghuamen	通化门	3	0.962	17.611	Xincheng	Xi'an
Wanshoulu	万寿路	8	1.672	19.283	Xincheng	Xi'an
Changlepo	长乐坡		1.619	20.902	Xincheng	Xi'an
Chanhe	浐河		1.371	22.273	Baqiao	Xi'an
Banpo	半坡		1.107	23.381	Baqiao	Xi'an
Fangzhicheng	纺织城	6 9	1.427	24.808	Baqiao	Xi'an
