= Xianyang West railway station =

Railway station in Xianyang, China

Xianyang West 咸阳西
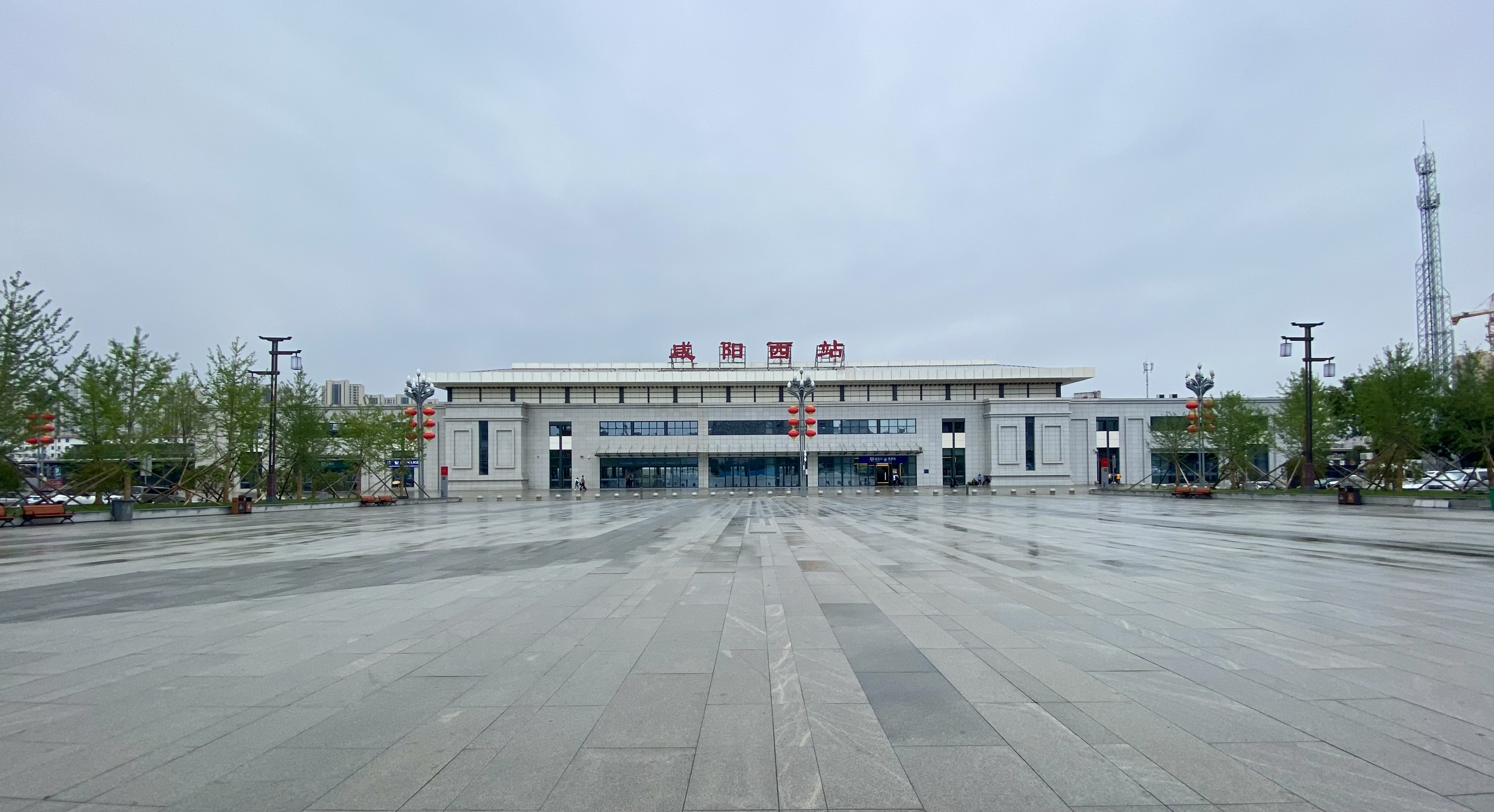
- Xianyang West railway station

General information
- Location: Renmin Road, Qindu District, Xianyang, Shaanxi; China
- Coordinates: 34.3327493°N 108.6623277°E
- Operated by: China Railway Xi'an Group
- Lines: Xi'an–Baoji high-speed railway; Xi'an Railway Hub

History
- Opened: 2013
Location

Xianyang West railway station (Chinese: 咸阳西站; pinyin: Xiányángxī zhàn), formerly known as Xianyang Qindu railway station (Chinese: 咸阳秦都站; pinyin: Xiányáng Qíndū zhàn), is a railway station on the Xi'an–Baoji high-speed railway. It is located in Qindu District, Xianyang, Shaanxi, China.

== History ==
The name of the station was changed to Xianyang West on 30 June 2021.

== Metro station ==
Train station has terminus of metro Line 1 Xi'an metro.
