= Xi'an Metro =

Metro system in Xi'an, China

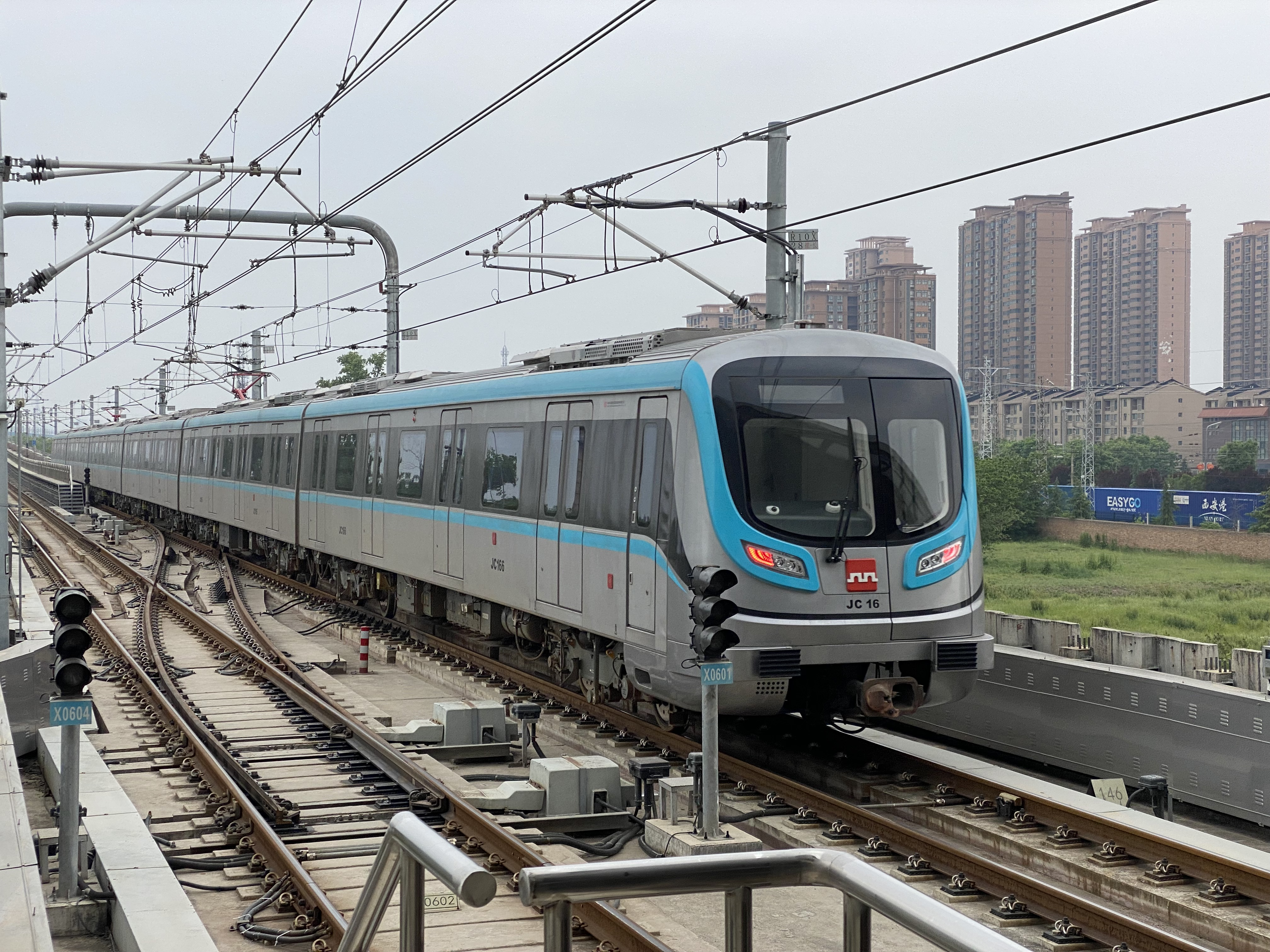
- A Line 14 train in May 2023

Overview
- Locale: Xi'an and Xianyang
- Transit type: Rapid transit
- Number of lines: 13
- Number of stations: 284
- Daily ridership: 3.81 million (2024 average); 6.238 million (31 December 2025 peak)
- Annual ridership: 1.399 billion (2024)
- Website: https://www.xianrail.com/

Operation
- Began operation: 16 September 2011; 15 years ago
- Operators: Xi'an Rail Transit Group Co., Ltd.

Technical
- System length: 423.2 km (263 mi)
- Track gauge: 1435 mm (standard gauge)

Xi'an Metro
- Traditional Chinese: 西安地鐵
- Simplified Chinese: 西安地铁
Transcriptions
Standard Mandarin
- Hanyu Pinyin: Xī'ān Dìtiě

The Xi'an Metro, also known as the Xi'an Rail Transit, is a rapid transit system in the city of Xi'an and the neighbouring city of Xianyang, in Shaanxi province, China.

With 423.2 km (262 mi) in operation across 13 lines, the system has surpassed London Underground in both network length and ridership. It first opened with Line 2 on September 16, 2011. Line 1 began operation on September 15, 2013. Line 3 began operation after months of delay on November 8, 2016. Line 4 opened on December 26, 2018. Lines 5, 6, 9 opened in December 2020. Line 14 opened in September 2019 and extended in June 2021. Xihu Line opened in November 2022. Line 16 opened on June 27, 2023. Line 10 opened on September 28, 2024. Line 8 opened on December 26, 2024. Line 15 opened on December 29, 2025. Line 17 is expected to open no earlier than late 2027.

Xi'an is one of the hardest city in China to build a metro system because this city is known as a thousand-year-old imperial city which almost entirely built upon layers of historical relics. Even the smallest underground soil layer could very well hold precious historical relics. To resolve the problem, every line of Xi'an Metro is destined to be a "meticulous archaeological project".

== History ==
Initial proposals for a subway in Xi'an were created in the 70s which called for the Xi'an City Wall to be demolished to make way for a ring subway line. This was similar to what was done to create Beijing Subway Line 2, but the plan was scrapped due to successful opposition by preservationists and lack of funding for the project. Later, Xi'an began its planning a multiline metro system in the mid-1980s. The plan was first submitted to the State Council in 1994, with four planned lines and a total length of 73.2 km (45.5 mi). In February 2004, the re-drafted plan was submitted to the State Government, which received final approval on September 13, 2006.

The first line, Line 2, began construction along Chang'an Street on 29 September 2006 and was completed in 2011. It runs north–south and passes under such historic sites as the Bell Tower and the Xi'an City Wall. It is 26.6 km (16.5 mi) long with 23.5 km (14.6 mi) lying underground, approximately 20 metres (65 ft 7 in) below the surface. It is estimated to have cost 17.9 billion yuan (US$2.24 billion). The route stretches from the Beikezhan to Weiqunan with 20 stops. The travel time is 39 minutes for the entire length, cutting the commute almost in half. Operations began on 28 September 2011.

Four other routes were planned to start construction in 2011 and to be finished by around 2020. Once completed, the system spanned 251.8 km (156.5 mi) and mainly serviced the urban and suburban districts of Xi'an and part of Xianyang.

On June 12, 2019, the NDRC approved the Phase III (2018-2024) Construction Plan of Xi'an Metro. The plan included Line 1 (Phase 3), Line 2 (Phase 2), Line 8, Line 10 (Phase 1), Line 14, Line 15 (Phase 1) and Line 16 (Phase 1). The total length of Xi'an Metro was to be 423 kilometres (263 mi).

As of January 2025, the network includes 11 metro lines and one commuter railway with a total length of 427.9 km (266 mi) and 270 stations.

== Lines in operation ==
Line	Terminals (District)		Commencement	Newest Extension	Length km	Stations	Operators
1	Xianyangxizhan (Qindu, Xianyang)	Fangzhicheng (Baqiao)	2013	2023	42.1	30	
2	Caotan (Weiyang)	Changninggong (Chang'an)	2011	2023	33.637	25	
3	Yuhuazhai (Yanta)	Baoshuiqu (Baqiao)	2016	—	39.15	26	
4	Xi'an Beizhan (Weiyang)	Hangtian Xincheng (Chang'an)	2018	—	35.2	29	
5	Xi'andongzhan (Baqiao)	Chuangxingang (Chang'an)	2020	2026	46.4	34	
6	Xi'annanzhan (Chang'an)	Fangzhicheng (Baqiao)	2020	2024	39.6	32	
8	Loop Line		2024		49.9	37	
9	Fangzhicheng (Baqiao)	Qinlingxi (Lintong)	2020	—	25.3	15	
10	Jingshangcun (Weiyang)	Zhaohuiguangchang (Gaoling)	2024	—	34.4	17	
14	Airport West (T1, T2, T3) (Weicheng, Xianyang)	Heshao (Baqiao)	2019	2021	42.96	18	
15	Xiliu (Chang'an)	Dongzhaoyu (Chang'an)	2025		19.46	13	
16	Qinchuangyuanzhongxin (Qindu, Xianyang)	Shijingli (Chang'an)	2023		15.03	9	
Xihu	Epanggongnan (Weiyang)	Huxian (Huyi)	2022	—	26.3	2	
Total ( Excluding Xihu Line )					423.2	284	

=== Line 1 ===
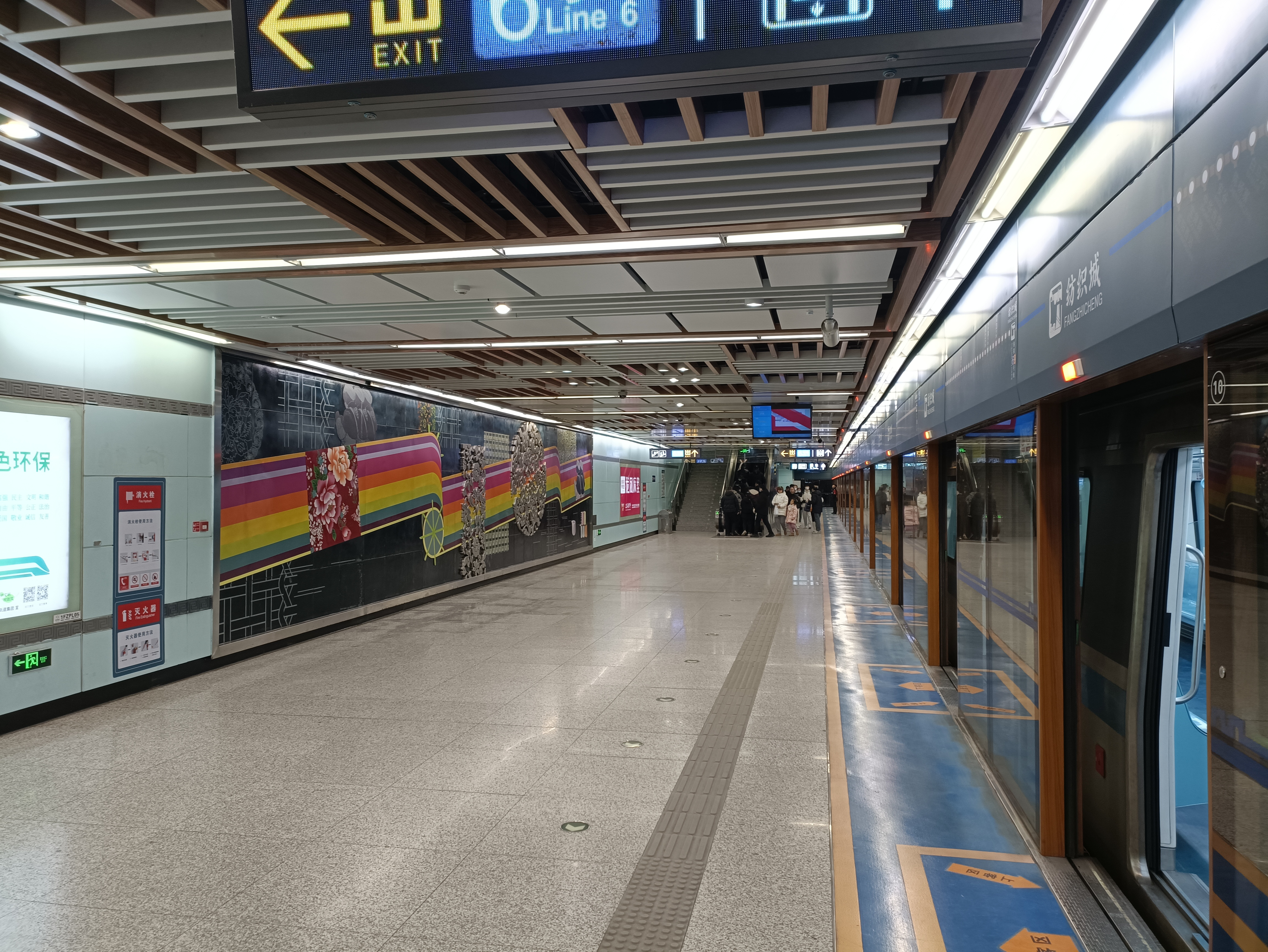
Fangzicheng Station, Line 1's Eastern Terminus

The second route, Line 1, was scheduled to start in late 2009 but was brought one year earlier as per Chinese government's response to the Great Recession. Line 1 opened on 15 September 2013. The route runs from east to west. The line is 31.45 km (19.54 mi) with 23 stations.

To accelerate the speed of overall economic development between Xi'an and Xianyang cities, the Transportation Department of Xi'an decided to extend Line 1 to promote business travel between the two cities, as well as improve the efficiency of land use alongside Line 1. The preparation phase for the extension Line 1 started with the compilation of a feasibility study on November 4, 2007.

=== Line 2 ===
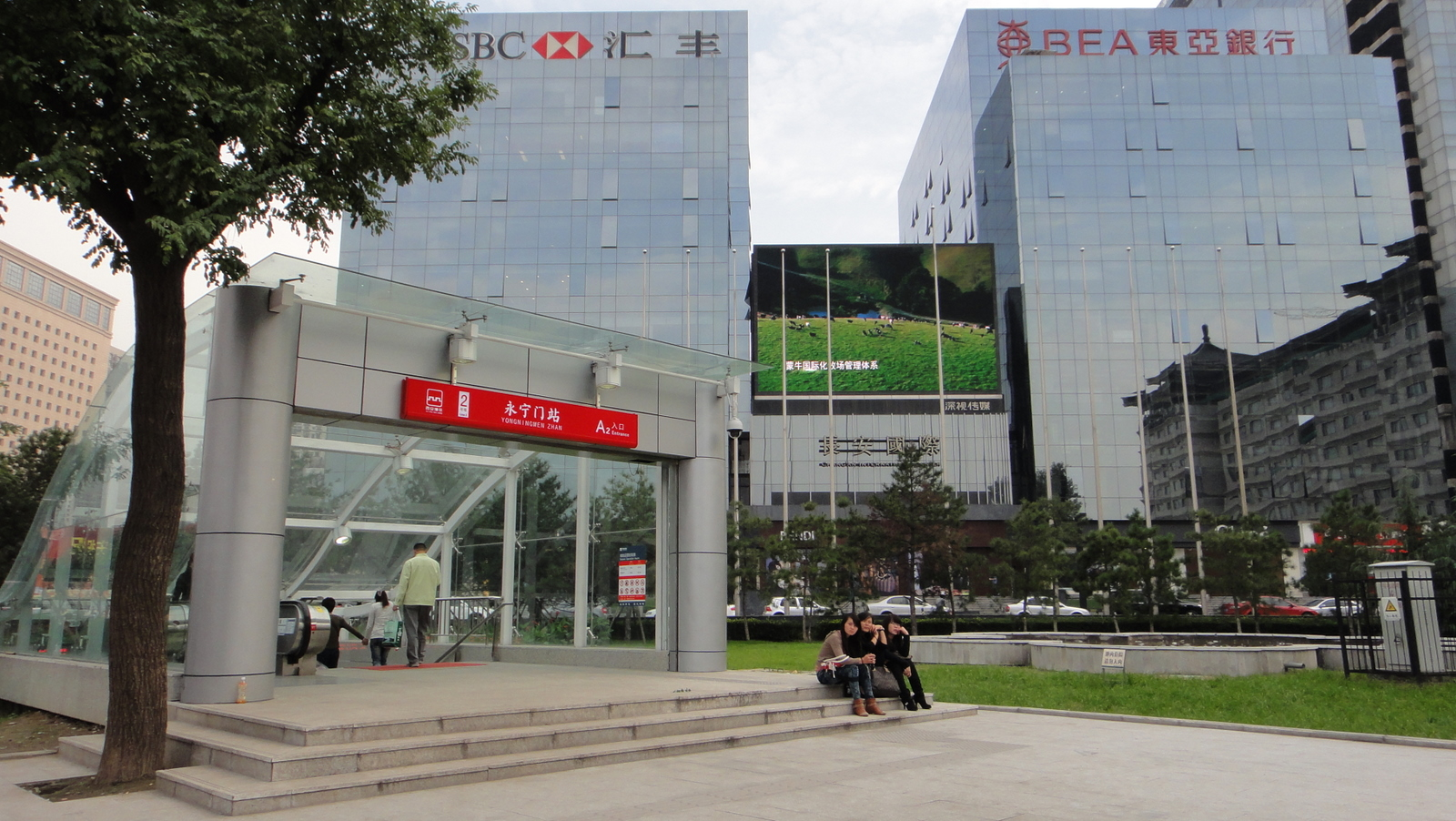
Yongningmen Station on Line 2

The first line that was opened, Line 2, opened on 16 September 2011. This line is 33.637 km (20.901 mi) long with 25 stations. The line runs from north to south.

Line 2 links the new Xi'an North Railway Station to Weiqu. It was built 20 m below ground to protect the Xi'an City Wall, built by the Ming Dynasty [1368-1644] that was 14 km long. To protect ancient buildings from the impact of vibration, advanced technologies were used.

=== Line 3 ===
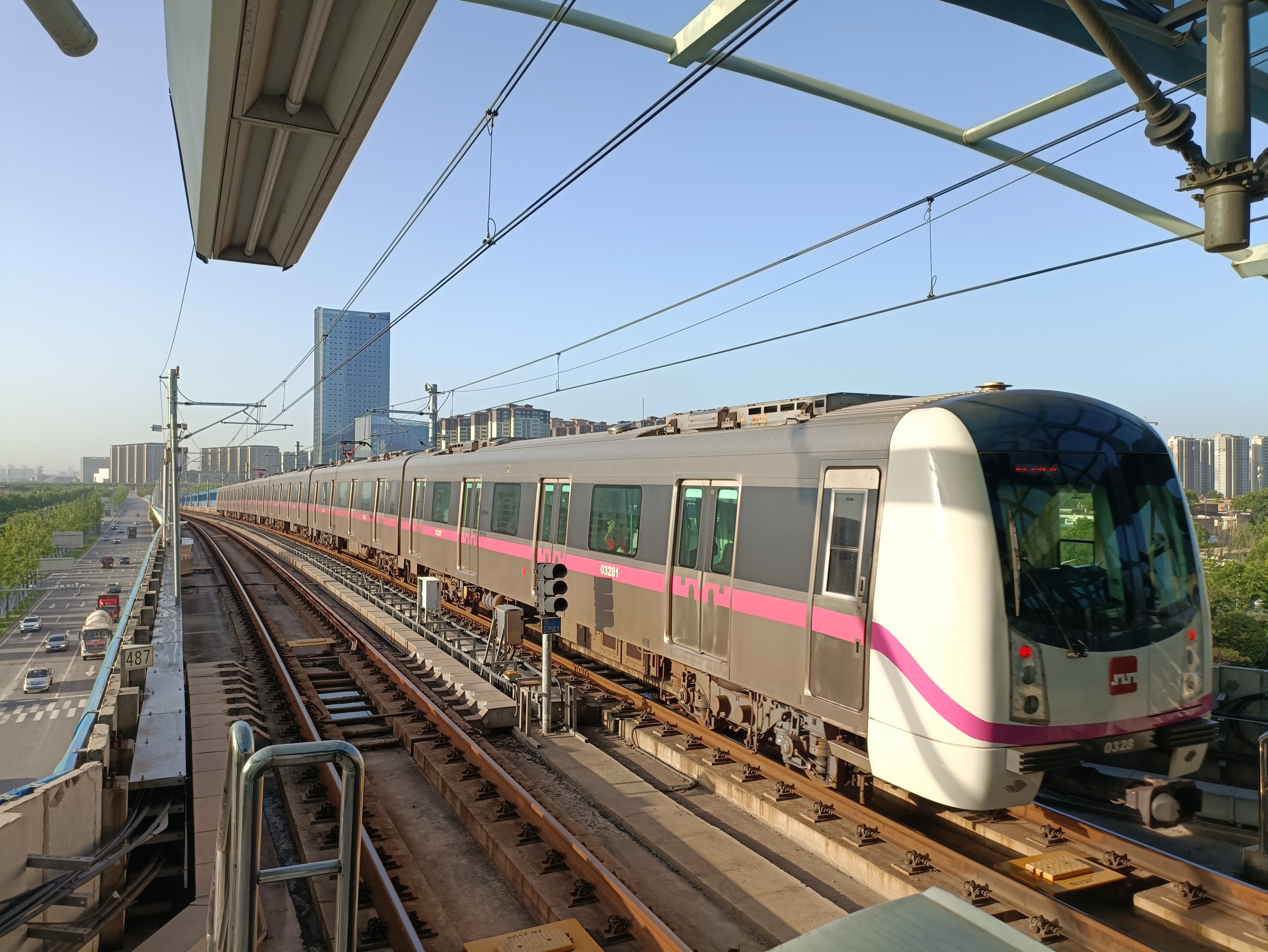
A Line 3 Train near Xinzhu Station

Construction of Xi'an Metro's Line 3 broke ground in May 2011, began public trial testing on September 20, 2016, and was opened on November 8, 2016. The line is currently 39.15 km (24.33 mi) long with 26 stations. When Phase 2 (still under planning) opens, the line will be 50.5 km (31.4 mi) long and with 31 stations.

=== Line 4 ===
Construction of test section of Line 4 of Xi'an Metro started in late 2012.

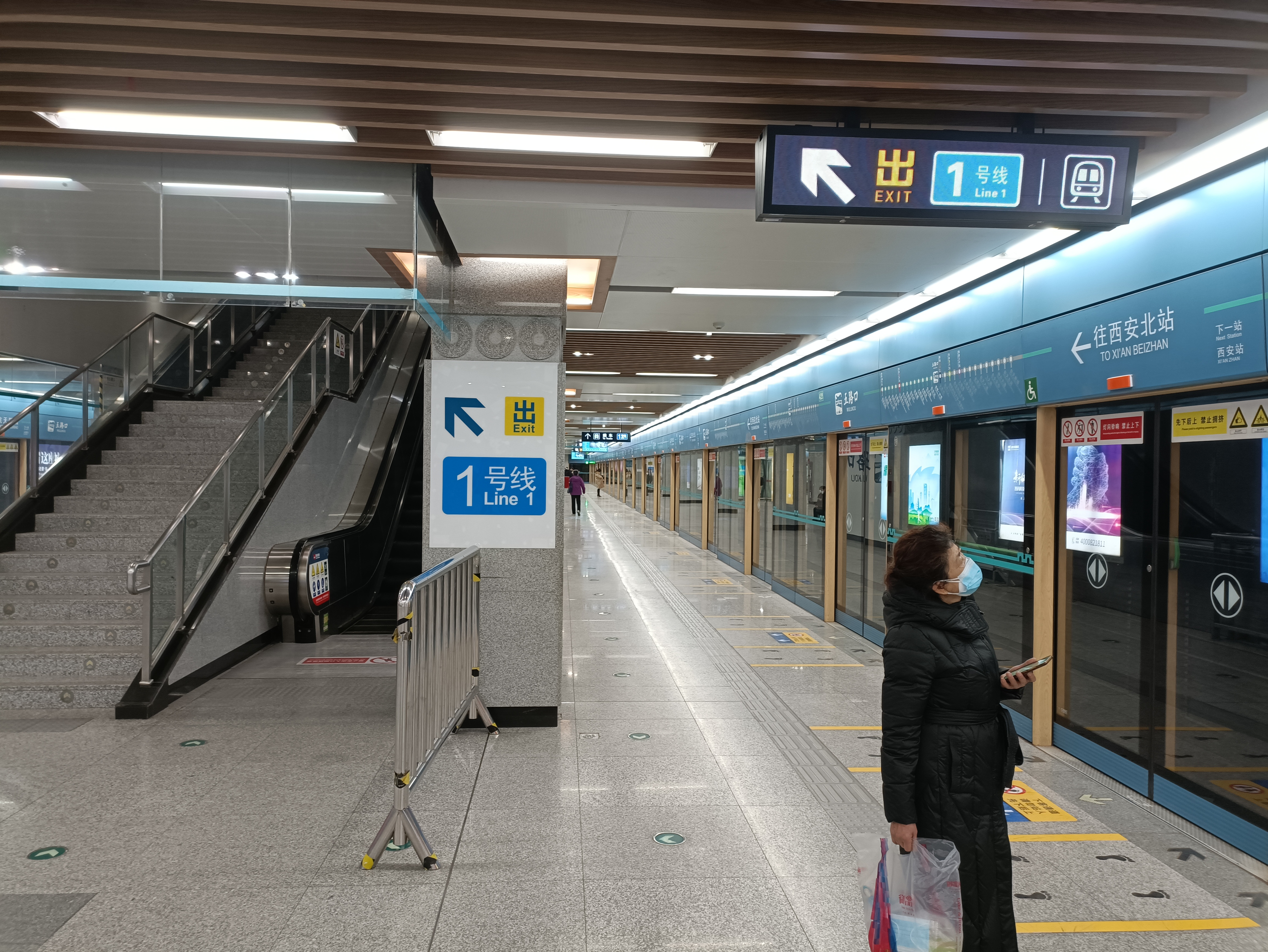
Wulukou Station on Line 4

Line 4 started service on December 26, 2018, it is currently 35.2 kilometres (21.9 mi).

On September 25, 2022, Xi'an railway station, an infill station, opened, bringing the amount of stations to 29.

=== Line 5 ===
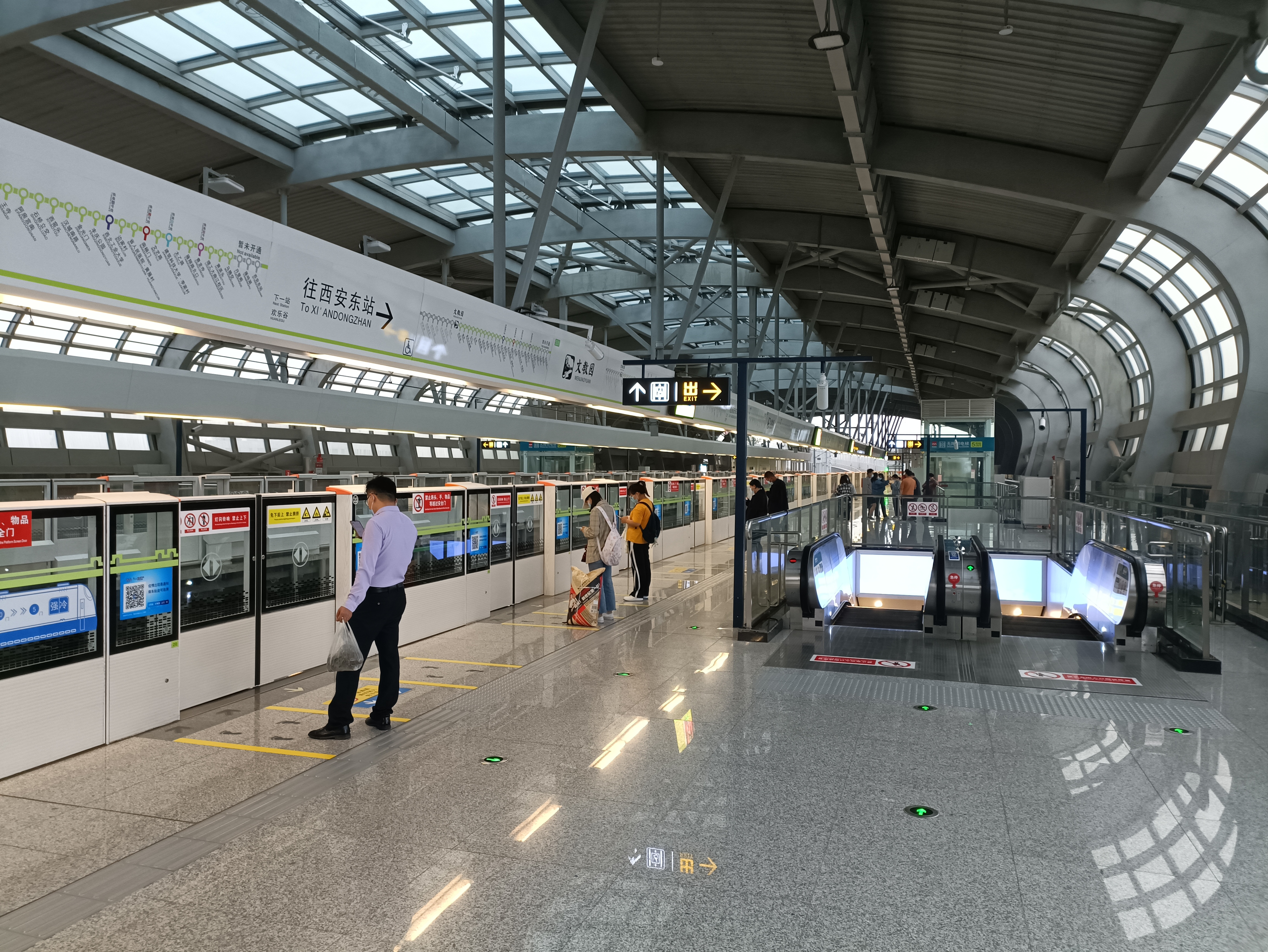
Wenjiaoyuan Station of Line 5

The first & second phase of Line 5 opened on December 28, 2020, it stretches from Chuangxingang to Matengkong and is 41.6 kilometres (25.8 mi) long. The line runs from east to west.

The eastern section of the first phase [Matengkong to Yanminghu] opened on September 26, 2024, bringing the line another 3.4 kilometres (2.1 mi), with future plans to extend 1 station east to the under construction Xi'an East Railway Station.

=== Line 6 ===
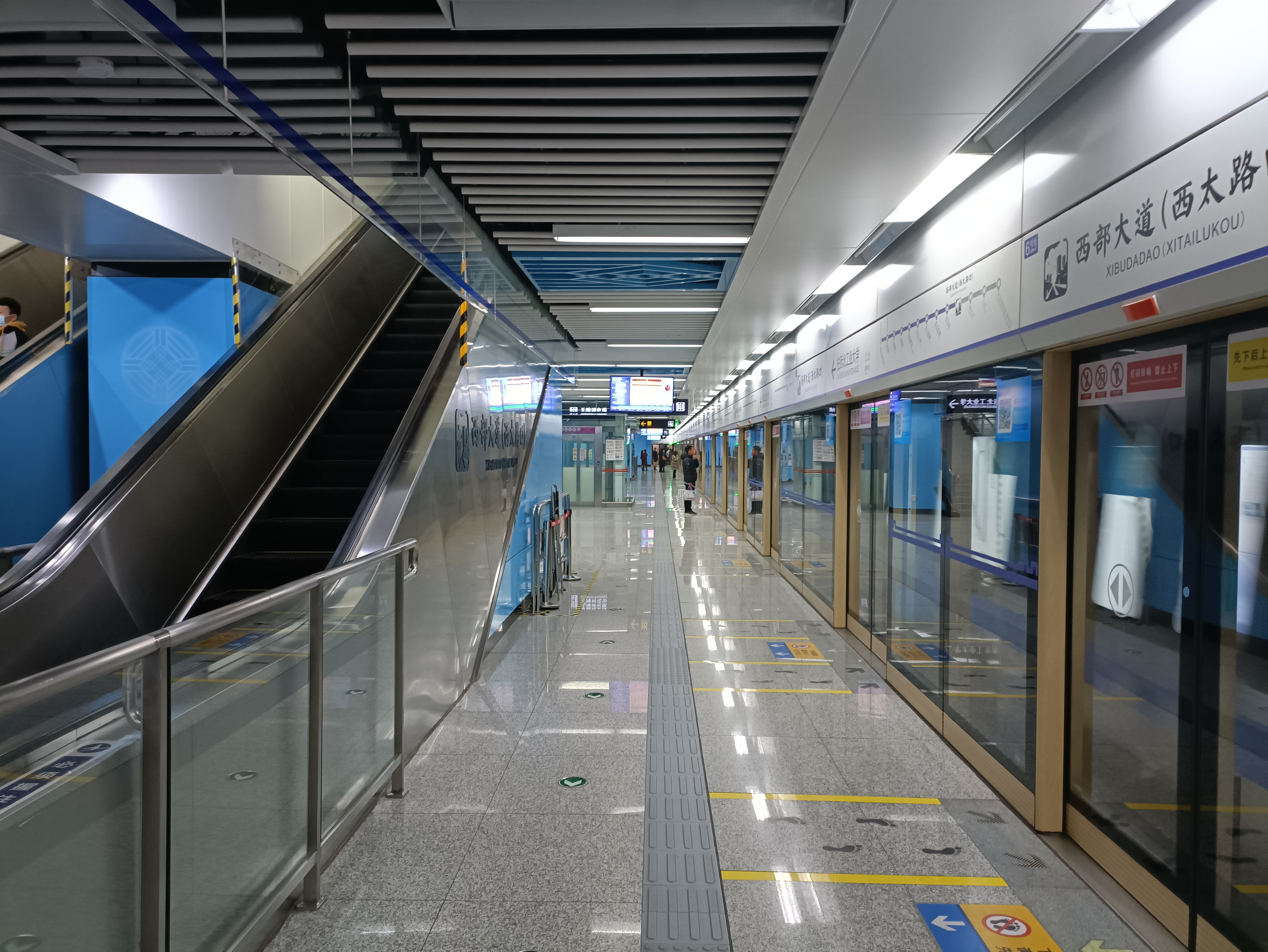
Xibudadao (Xitailukou) Station of Line 6

Line 6 opened on December 28, 2020 from Northwestern Polytechnical University to Xi'an International Medical Center with 15.6 kilometres (9.7 mi).

The second phase opened on December 29, 2022, when the line was extended from Northwestern Polytechnical University to Fangzhicheng, bringing 19.5 kilometres (12.1 mi), and was extended 4.5 kilometres (2.8 mi) further southeast from Xi'an Int'll Medical Center to Xi'an South Railway Station, another under construction railway station.

=== Line 8 ===
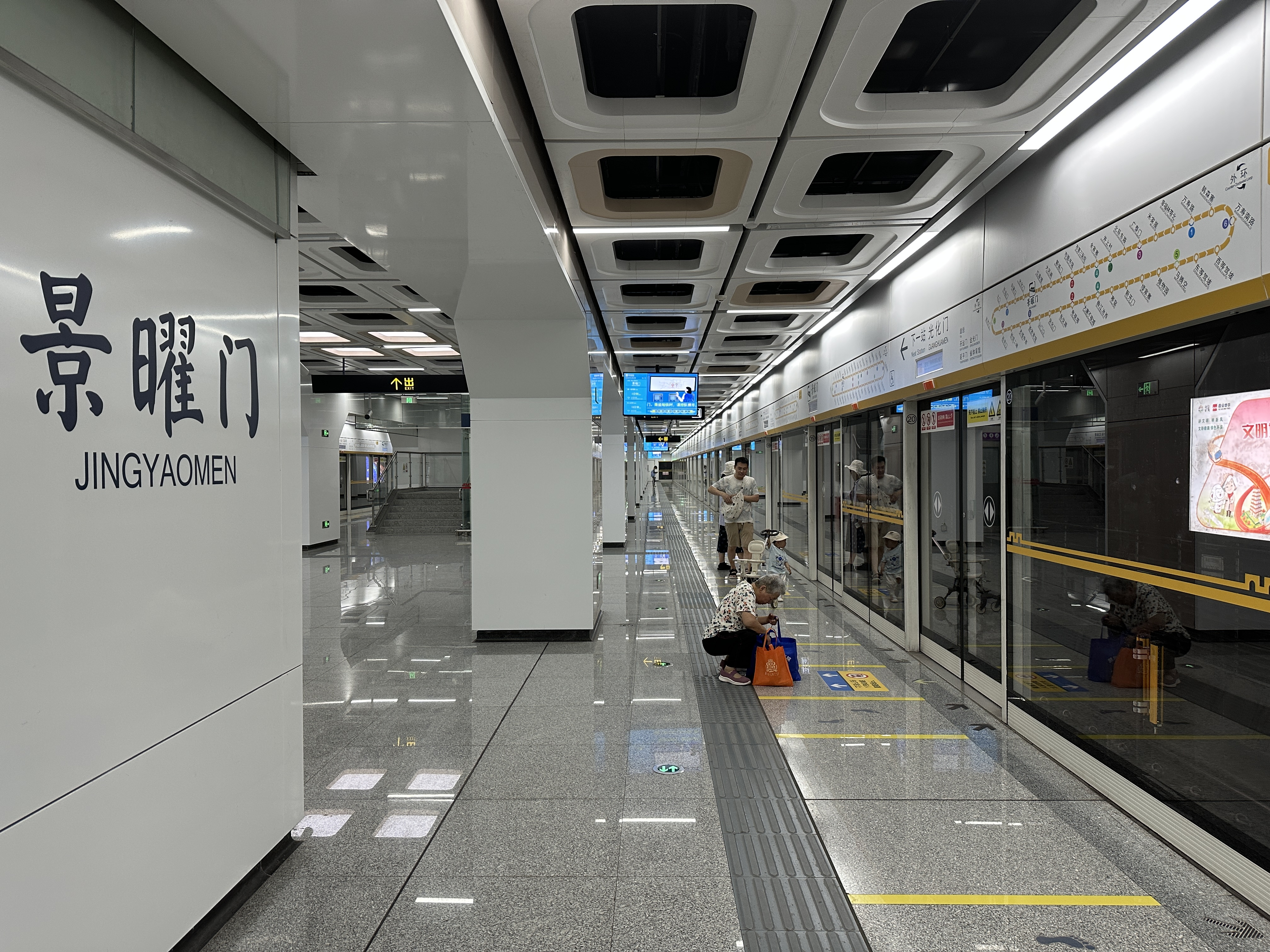
Jingyaomen Station of Line 8

Line 8 opened on December 26, 2024, it is 49.9 kilometres (31.0 mi) long and is a fully underground circular line with 37 stations.

=== Line 9 ===
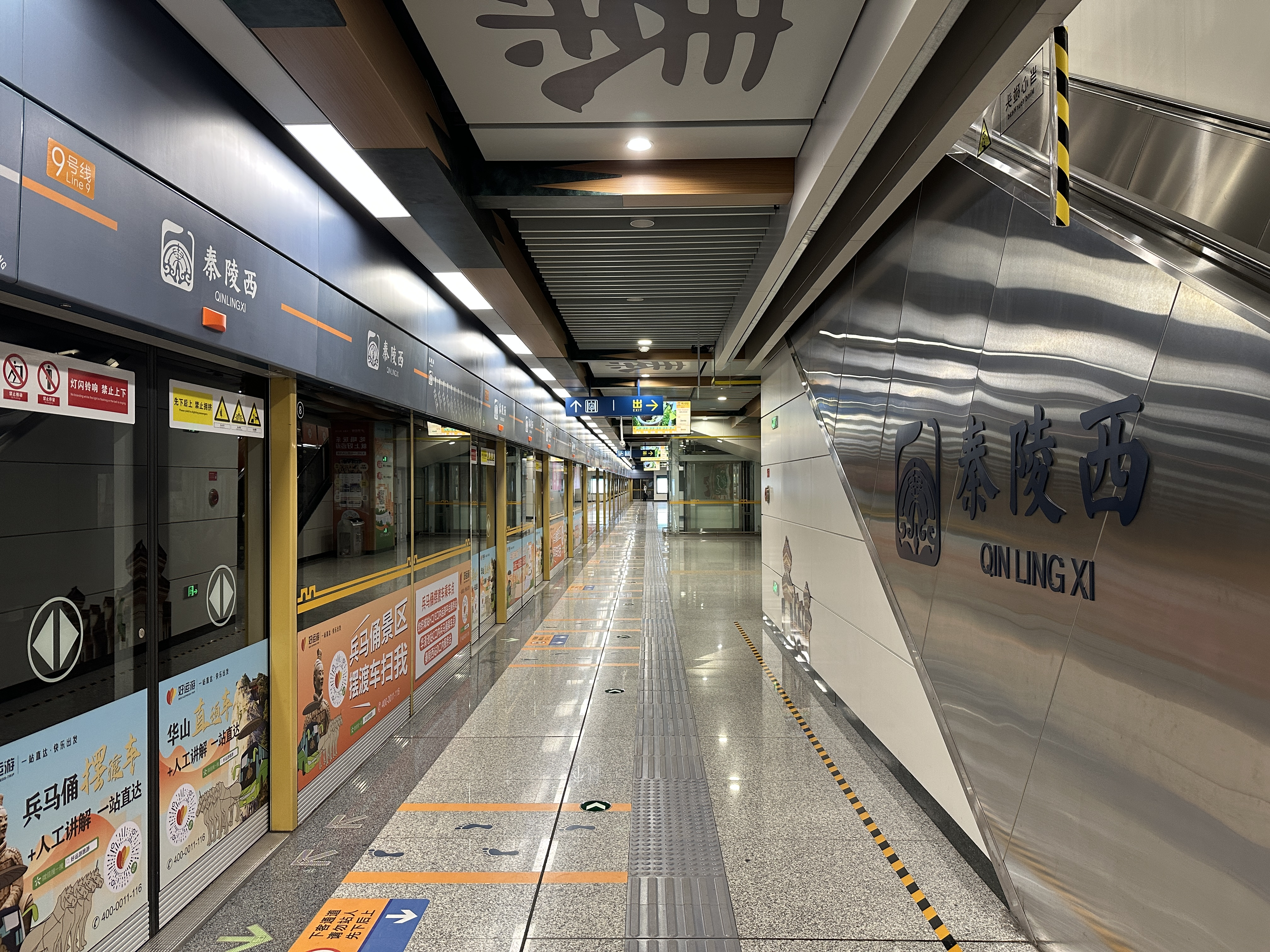
Qinlingxi Station of Line 9

Line 9 opened on December 28, 2024, starting from Fangzhicheng, the eastern terminus of Line 1 & 6, to Qinlingxi, which is 25.2 kilometres (15.7 mi) long.

=== Line 10 ===
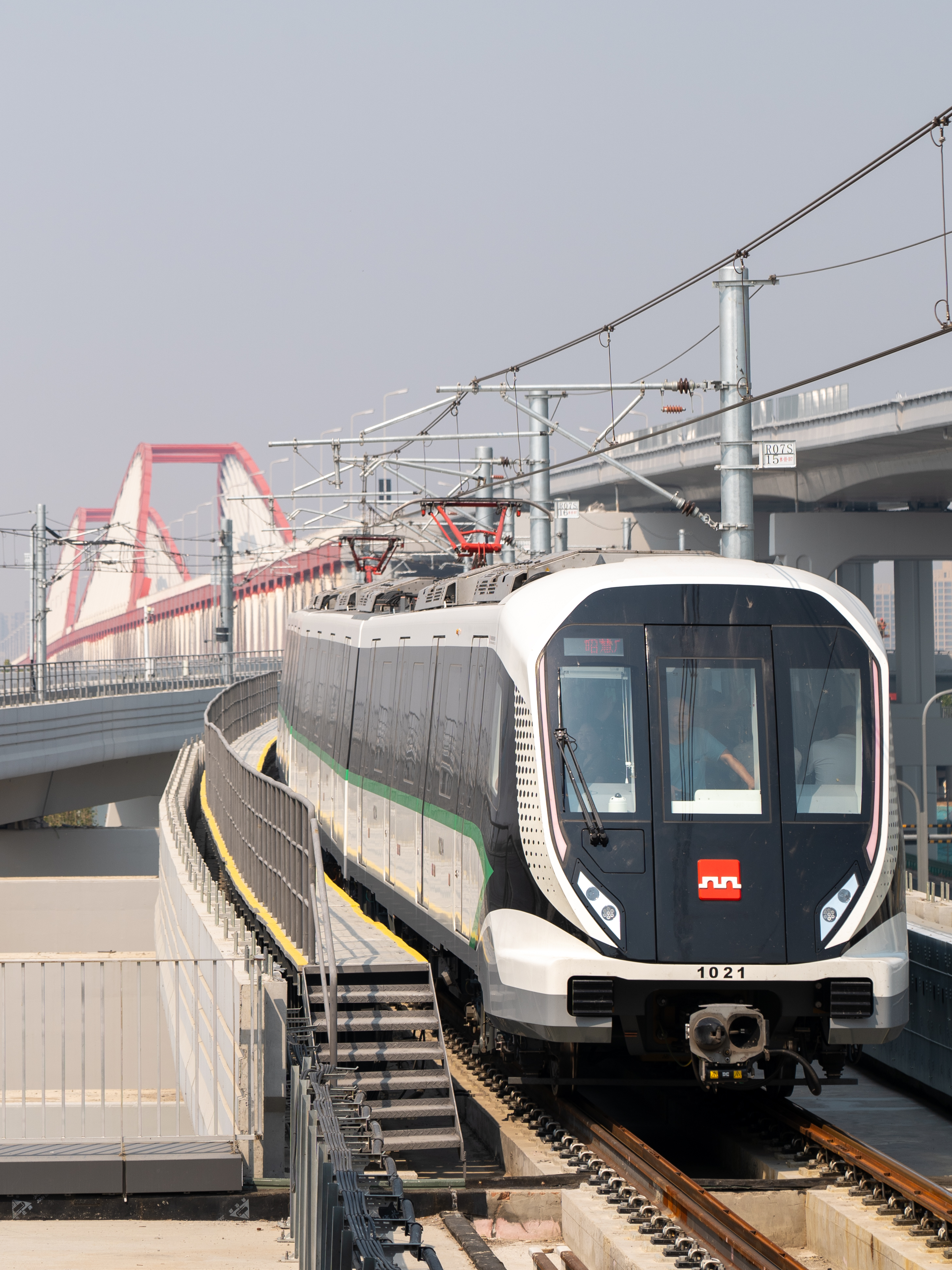
Line 10 train near Jingweibandao Station

Line 10 opened on September 26, 2024, from Jingshangcun to Zhaohuiguangchang, it is 34.4 kilometres (21.4 mi) long.

=== Line 14 ===
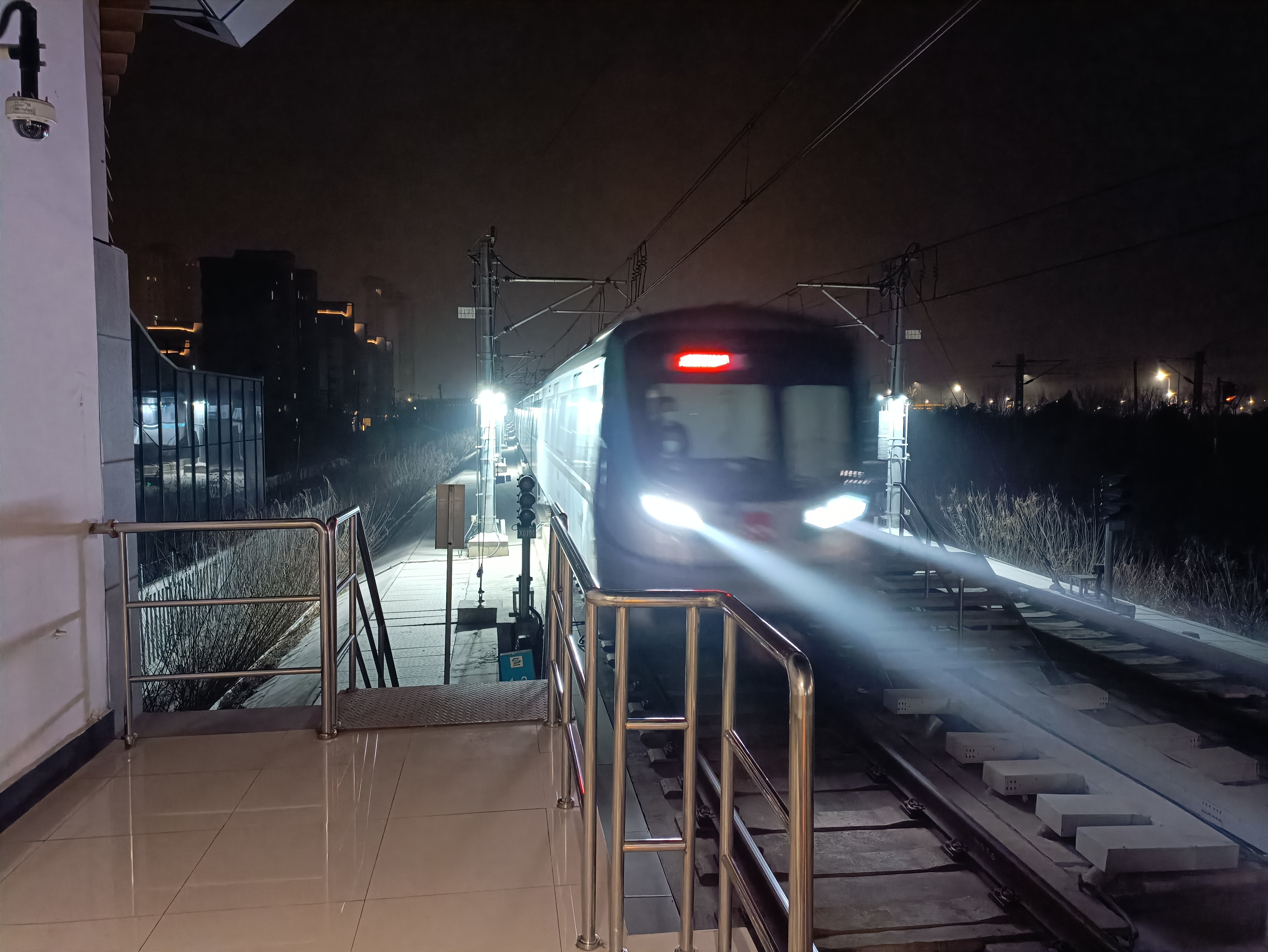
A Line 14 Train near Qinhan Xincheng Station

It was formerly the Airport Intercity railway before it was now integrated as Line 14, when this happened, the operator transferred to Xi'an Metro from Shaanxi Railway. The 29.31 km western section from Airport West (T1, T2, T3) to Xi'an Beizhan opened on 29 September 2019. The 13.65 km (8.48 mi) eastern section from Xi'an Beizhan to Heshao opened on 29 June 2021.

=== Line 15 ===
Line 15 opened on December 29, 2025, the first phase that stretched from Xiliu to Dongzhaoyu is 19.46 kilometres (12.09 mi) long.

=== Line 16 ===
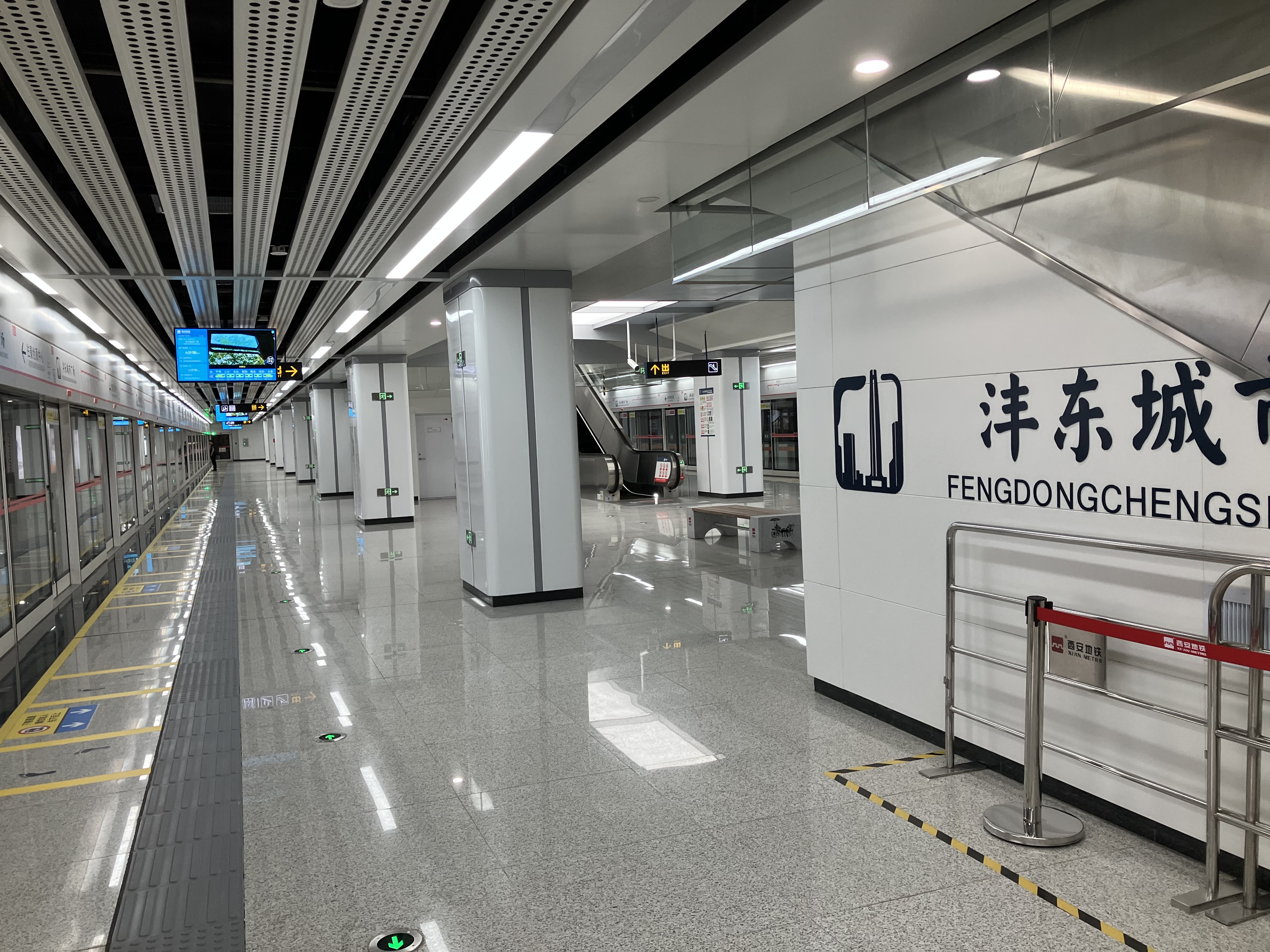
Fengdongchengshiguangchang station of Line 16

Line 16 opened on June 27, 2023, the first phase that stretched from Shijingli to Qinchuangyuanzhongxin is 15.03 kilometres (9.34 mi) long.

=== Xihu Line ===
Xihu Line opened in November 2022, it is currently 41.3 kilometres (25.7 mi) long that stretched from Epanggongnan to Huxian, with no intermediate stations, there are 3 infill stations planned in between them, which are Kunmingchi, Mawang, and Wuzhu.

== Future development ==
The final section of Line 5 connects to a new railway station and is to open at the same time as that station.

On June 12, 2019, the NDRC approved the Phase III (2018-2024) Construction Plan of Xi'an Metro. The plan includes Line 1 (Phase 3), Line 2 (Phase 2), Line 8, Line 10 (Phase 1), Line 14, Line 15 (Phase 1), Line 16 (Phase 1). The total length of Xi'an Metro under this plan was to reach 423 kilometres (263 mi) in 2024.

Phase 2 of Line 15 and Line 23 not meet the requirements and not approved to construction because within 800 meters on each side of the planned large-capacity rail line, the total of current population and job density must not be less than 14,000 people per square kilometer.

Planned operation time	Construction since	Line	Phase/Section	Terminals		Length in km	Stations	Reference
2028	2024	17	Phase I	Airport (T5)	Fupingxingzhengzhongxin	69.3	8	
Total						69.3		

== Incidents ==
On 30 December 2008, a fire occurred that was extinguished within an hour; all workers evacuated safely. Just 66 hours later, on 2 January, another fire occurred at another station on Line 2.

On 26 May 2009, an individual suffered minor injuries from a fire during infrastructure work on Line 1.

On 2 August 2009, 9:20am, a cave-in at the construction site of Sajinqiao section of Line 1 trapped migrant workers under 10 cubic meters of earth for over three hours, hospitalizing at least two who later died at the hospital.

== See also ==
- List of rapid transit systems
- Urban rail transit in China
