= Renmin Road Subdistrict, Xianyang =

Renmin Road Subdistrict 人民路街道
- Subdistrict
- Location in China
- Coordinates: 34°20′13″N 108°42′9″E
- Country: China
- Province: Shaanxi
- Prefecture-level city: Xianyang
- District: Qindu District
- Time zone: UTC+8 (China Standard Time)

Renmin Road Subdistrict (Chinese: 人民路街道; pinyin: Rénmínlù Jiēdào) is a subdistrict situated in Qindu District, Xianyang, Shaanxi, China. As of 2020, it administers the following thirteen residential neighborhoods:

- Leyubei Road Community (乐育北路社区)
- Leyunan Road Community (乐育南路社区)
- Jiahui Community (嘉惠社区)
- Tianwang First Community (天王一区)
- Eryin Community (二印社区)
- Weiyang Road North Community (渭阳路北社区)
- Weiyang Road South Community (渭阳路南社区)
- Fangji Community (纺机社区)
- Ermian Community (二棉社区)
- Shengli Street Community (胜利街社区)
- Zhonghong Community (中宏社区)
- Tuanjiebei Road Community (团结北路社区)
- Youyibei Road Community (友谊北路社区)

== See also ==
- List of township-level divisions of Shaanxi
