= Shaanxi delegation to the National People's Congress =

Shaanxi Delegation to the National People's Congress
- 全国人民代表大会陕西省代表团
- Delegation for the National People's Congress
- Map showing the location of Shaanxi Province
- Electoral unit: Shaanxi Province
- Population: 39,530,000

Current Delegation
- Created: 1954
- Seats: 69
- Head of delegation: Zhao Yide
- Provincial People's Congress: Shaanxi Provincial People's Congress

The Shaanxi delegation to the National People's Congress is a delegation composed of deputies representing Shaanxi Province within the National People's Congress (NPC), the supreme organ of state power of the People's Republic of China. NPC deputies from the Shaanxi Province are officially elected by the Shaanxi Provincial People's Congress.

== List of deputies ==
Year	NPC sessions	Deputies	Number of deputies	Ref.
1954	1st	Yu Zhenying, Wang Debiao, An Wenqin, Li Fenglian, Li Furen, Li Fuqing, Meng Tianlu, Ma Mingfang, Zhang Fenghui, Cao Guanqun, Xu Jingzhang, Yang Zhifang, Pu Zhongzhi, Zhao Shoushan, Pan Zili, Han Zhaoe, Han Xiacun, Han Wangchen, Su Zichen: By-election on June 29, 1957: Wang Shoudao		
1959	2nd	Fang Zhongru, Wang Baojing, Wang Juren, Wang Debiao, An Wenqin, Yan Xinmin, Su Zichen, Li Fenglian (female), Li Fuqing (female), Lu Jingyun, Chen Daxie, Chen Yugao, Zhang Shouyin, Zhang Jinju, Zhang Qiuxiang (female), Yue Jieheng, Zhao Zhankui, Zhao Shoushan, Zhao Boping, Tang Hongcheng, Ma Pingfu, Ma Mingfang, Yuan Zhengting, Xi Zhongxun, Yu Hongzheng, Xiong Yingdong, Han Wangchen		
1964	3rd	Wan Jianzhong, Shan Xiuzhen, Ma Guifu, Fang Zhongru, Fang Zida, Wang Shoufu, Wang Bingzheng, Wang Bingnan, Wang Xiutong, Wang Baojing, Wang Juren, Wang Debiao, Deng Yichun, Feng Yihang, Feng Qinwei, Shi Nianhai, Jiang Renshou, Liu Wenwei, Liu Jianghan, Liu Yinzhe, Liu Sufei, Liu Yuzhong, Liu Lantao, Yan Kelun, Yan Xinmin, Su Jinhe, Su Zichen, Li Shulin, Li Da, Li Qiming, Li Fuqing, Yang Cunfu, Yang Zhongjian, Zhang Shouyin Zhang Bosheng, Zhang Jinju, Zhang Qiuxiang, Chen Daxie, Chen Yugao, Chen Shutao, Chen Jidan, Chen Junde, Chen Duanbing, Wu Bolun, Lin Xiuying, Zhou Ji, Zhao Shoushan, Zhao Boping, Hu Jingru, Zhong Shitong, Hou Zonglian, Yao Wo, Haitao, Gao Kelin, Gao Bukun, Gao Jingde, Yuan Zhengting, Gong Zutong, Wen Qixiang, Peng Tianqi, Han Wangchen, Hui Zhongquan, Shu Tong, Yu Hongzheng, Lu Duanyi, Cai Ziwei, Xiong Yingdong, Pan Mingzi, Huo Zile		
1975	4th	Ma Fengshun, Ma Shiying, Ma Rongli, Ma Hongqi, Wang Fengqin, Wang Liangjia, Wang Mingxin, Wang Dinghua, Wang Xiangling, Wang Jiacheng, Wang Deyuan, Ju Guangyao, Fang Fulin, Yin Jufang, Shi Lansheng, Tong Guirong, Liu Shuxian, Sun Liushi, Li Fenglan, Li Yulan, Li Shiying, Li Kerong, Li Shangsheng, Li Chunyuan, Li Xiangchen, Li Hongming, Li Ruishan, Li Deyuan, Yang Zhanchun, Wu Guixian, Yu Jingqing, Song Keqin Zhang Shide, Zhang Xin'an, Zhang Minhua, Zhang Furong, Zhang Yizhen, Zhang Hailong, Lu Songshan, Chen Qiufang, Chen Zhihua, Jia Laxiang, Shang Shengcai, Luo Zhenxiang, Luo Yanjun, Shan Huaixiang, Zhao Fengzhi, Zhao Hongzhang, Hao Shucai, Yao Lianwei, Gao Mingyue, Guo Xizhen, Huang Jingyao, Chang Weihua, Cui Laiqin, Kang Sheng, Hui Shigong, Lei Datian, Cai Yunhou, Lin Wenzhang, Xiong Yingdong, Yan Nongyang, Huo Shilian, Xue Yukun		
1978	5th	Ding Mai'e, Yu Mingtao, Ma Shiying, Ma Qicai, Ma Zhongying, Wang Shouxian, Wang Shouzhen, Wang Yuan, Wang Lin, Wang Jiacheng, Wang Xincheng, Wang Zhen, Niu Shushen, Niu Yudian, Mao Yidong, Fang Fulin, Bai Xiangyin, Feng Xijia, Feng Dejin, Qu Yongxun, Tong Guirong, Zhu Fengzhen, Liu Hansan, Liu Shuxian, Sun Bingyue, Sun Guilan, Sun Liushi, Yun Xi'an, Yan Xinmin, Yan Zuti, Su Yaoxian, Li Changshun, Li Fenglan, Li Yulan, Li Benlin, Li Yongchun, Li Ruishan, Li Deyuan, Yang Cunfu, Yang Jianzhong, Yang Nansheng, Yang Zhong Jian, Dou Shirong, Wu Jikang, Wu Hanjin, Wu Jianzhi, Wu Haiyang, Zhang Xin'an, Zhang Yushu, Zhang Shijie, Zhang Minhua, Zhang Zhihe, Zhang Yizhen, Chen Ji'ou, Jia Laxiang, Shang Shengcai, Luo Yusheng, Luo Zhiquan, Zhou Hongjin, Shan Huaixiang, Qu Wu, Zhao Kedu, Zhao Hongzhang, Hao Shucai, Hu Sheng, Hou Zonglian, He Guiwen, Geng Yanxi, Xu Huicui, Xu Dianming, Ling Zhide, Gao Kelin, Tang Xiaohui, Yan Zhixin, Hui Shigong, Lu Guilan, Lu Xiaoyun, Jin Xinwang, Lu Duanyi, Bao Shouye, Xiong Yingdong, Pan Songchen, Yan Nongyang		
1983	6th	Yu Jiping, Ma Wenrui, Wang Shizhen, Wang Renzhong, Wang Jinping, Wang Yanzhu, Wang Baojing, Fang Jizhong, Shi Kexun, Zhu Chunhua, Liu Zhihong, Liu Yinwu, Liu Xianzeng, Liu Ji, Xu Xiuqin, Xu Baoshan, Sun Yuxian, Sun Daren, Sun Cuihuan, Mou Guangjun, Yan Kelun, Yan Youmin, Li Guangzhong, Li Qingwei, Li Shuying, Yang Youdao, Yang Nansheng, Yang Jihai, Wu Jikang, Wu Zukai, Song Youtian, Zhang Yushu, Zhang Shucheng, Zhang Deyun, Chen Yuanfang Chen Shaofan, Jia Laxiang, Shang Changrong, Ji Wenmei, Zhou Zijian, Zhou Tianxiao, Zhou Xueqin, Zheng Shuzi, Zhao Changjun, Zhao Jianchu, Zhao Hongzhang, Hu Cai, Ke Shuren, Hou Zonglian, Xia Tian, Gu Fen, Xu Yongji, Xu Dianming, Gao Yinzhao, Gao Dengbang, Tang Zhaoqian, Tan Weixu, Fu Hao, Han Yuanzhong, Hui Shigong, Shu Zhe, You Enpu, Xie Huaide, Xie Yuanru, Lu Duanyi, Chu Yanyu, Cai Juyun, Xiong Yingdong, Pan Songchen, Huo Shiren, Wei Zhiwang		
1988	7th	Yu Jiping, Ma Wenrui, Wang Shizhen, Wang Renzhong, Wang Jinping, Wang Yanzhu, Wang Baojing, Fang Jizhong, Shi Kexun, Zhu Chunhua, Liu Zhihong, Liu Yinwu, Liu Xianzeng, Liu Ji, Xu Xiuqin, Xu Baoshan, Sun Yuxian, Sun Daren, Sun Cuihuan, Mou Guangjun, Yan Kelun, Yan Youmin, Li Guangzhong, Li Qingwei, Li Shuying, Yang Youdao, Yang Nansheng, Yang Jihai, Wu Jikang, Wu Zukai, Song Youtian, Zhang Yushu, Zhang Shucheng, Zhang Deyun, Chen Yuanfang Chen Shaofan, Jia Laxiang, Shang Changrong, Ji Wenmei, Zhou Zijian, Zhou Tianxiao, Zhou Xueqin, Zheng Shuzi, Zhao Changjun, Zhao Jianchu, Zhao Hongzhang, Hu Cai, Ke Shuren, Hou Zonglian, Xia Tian, Gu Fen, Xu Yongji, Xu Dianming, Gao Yinzhao, Gao Dengbang, Tang Zhaoqian, Tan Weixu, Fu Hao, Han Yuanzhong, Hui Shigong, Shu Zhe, You Enpu, Xie Huaide, Xie Yuanru, Lu Duanyi, Chu Yanyu, Cai Juyun, Xiong Yingdong, Pan Songchen, Huo Shiren, Wei Zhiwang		
1993	8th	Ding Guangen, Yu Xiaowen, Wan Shaofen, Ma Damou, Ma Pingyi, Wang Dazhong, Wang Jiufu, Wang Guanglin, Wang Shuangxi, Wang Yujin, Wang Shichen, Wang Shutang, Wang Ling, Wang Guihong, Wang Qingong, Shi Junxian, Shi Yuqing, Bai Qingcai, Ning Changshan, Si Nan, Zhu Shibao, Zhu Chunhua, Liu Wenxi, Liu Ronghui, Liu Zunyi, Mou Lingsheng, Lu Cuixue, Su Ming, Li Shengtang, Li Chengbo, Li Junsheng, Li Dianrong, Xiao Zhengcheng Wang Zhaoxian, Shen Rulin, Zhang Xiaoke, Zhang Fan, Zhang Baoqing, Lu Guoyi, Chen Zuoren, Chen Guofu, Chen Shuyang, Yi Lanfen, Luo Hongxi, Pang Jiayu, Zheng Xiulin, Zhao Mixiang, Zhao Bingzhang, Liu Suinian, Shi Wenhai, Shi Runzhi, He Guimei, Qin Baoying, Yuan Zhongyi, Gui Zhongyue, Dang Lei, Guo Fenglian, Tang Jichu, Cui Lintao, Liang Chunfang, Peng Yumei, Jiao Licheng, Ti Kaoshan, Lei Renyi, Yan Yibiao, Pan Ji		
1998	9th	Ding Zhongzhi, Yu Xiaowen, Wan Xueyuan, Wan Shaofen, Shan Lun, Ma Damou, Ma Zhongping, Ma Ping, Ma Pingyi (Hui), Ma Kening, Ma Tieshan, Wang Xijing, Wang Shutang, Wang Wei, Wang Liguang, Wang Baocun, Niu Yuqin, Kong Xiangmei, Ai Pishan, Lu Gang, Shi Xingquan, Feng Xuchu, Gong Deshun, Liu Sanyang, Liu Huaguo, Liu Xiaowen, Chi Qun, Li Yuanhu, Li Chengbo (Manchu), Li Hua, Li Jianguo, Li Dang, Li Dianrong Yang Zhong, Tong Shaocheng (Manchu), Wang Zhaoxian, Zhang Xiaoke, Zhang Litong, Zhang Hainan, Zhang Yan, Chen Shuangquan, Chen Youde, Chen Yiheng, Zhou Weijian, Zhou Ruoqi, Zhou Lian, Pang Jiayu, Ju Linhua, Zhao Liming, Rong Hai, Liu Suinian, Gui Zhongyue, Dang Lei, Xu Shanlin, Xu Baofeng, Gao Cunde, Gao Suhua, Guo Fenglian, Huang Zhong, Cao Lianzhi, Chang Wenzhi, Jiang Zhenghua, Han Wei, Han Yaowu, Cheng Andong, Lei Renyi, Dai Zhengliang		
2003	10th	Yu Wen (female), Ma Pingyi (Hui nationality), Ma Baidang, Ma Kening (female), Ma Jinquan, Wang Dongfeng, Wang Yongping, Wang Xijing, Wang Qian (female), Wang Dengji, Niu Yuqin (female), Hu Sishe, Kong Xiangmei (female), Tian Jie, Feng Yueju (female), Feng Xuchu, Qiao Zhanshan, Liu Sanyang, Liu Huaguo, Liu Jianshen, An Zhisheng, Sun Qingyun, Li Hua, Li Pengde, Li Jianguo, Li Xiaodong, Yang Zhong, Yang Jingcai, Wu Qin, Wu Dengchang, Zhang Wenxuan, Zhang Shengchao, Zhang Liyong, Zhang Guang Qiang, Zhang Tinghao, Zhang Shenian, Zhang Geng, Zhang Jiyu, Zhang Yan (female), Lu Dong, Chen Jiangling (female), Chen Yiheng, Chen Yiyu, Chen Deming, Fan Xiaomei (female), Zhou Weijian (female), Zhou Huizhi (female), Zhou Lian, Zheng Fenli (female), Zhao Jiechen, Zhao Yanfang, Zhao Guohai, Rong Hai, Hu Taiping, Hu Wenrui, Hu Huaibang, Gui Zhongyue, Jia Zhibang, Guo Jiaxue, Huang Wei (female), Huang He, Huang Chunchang, Huang Teng, Cui Lintao, Jiang Zhenghua, Zeng Peiyan, Dai Zhengliang, Wei Minzhou		
2008	11th	Yu Wen (female), Qian Junchang, Ma Kening (female), Wang Hui (female), Wang Zhaoguo, Wang Hong, Wang Xia (female), Wang Qian (female), Wang Yongchao, Wang Daofu, Wang Lanming, Hu Sishe, Shi Guilu, Bai Aying, Feng Yueju (female), Feng Junping (Hui), Feng Xinzhu, Zhu Zhigang, Hua Wei, Liu Huilian (female), Liu Jianshen, Liu Jianming, Liu Guisheng, An Dong, Sun Yuxi, Li Dakai, Li Jinzhu, Li Pengde, Li Heiji, Yang Fengqi, Yang Yongmao, Yang Shaoqing, Yang Guanjun (Hui) He Xiaohong (female), Zhang Guangqiang, Zhang Jinqiu (female), Chen Fenxin, Chen Baogen, Chen Qiang, Zhou Weijian (female), Zheng Ya, Zheng Fenli (female), Qu Yajun (female), Meng Xiangkai, Zhao Zhengyong, Zhao Leji, Zhao Leqin, Zhao Jiping, Zhao Chao, Zhao Xilin (female), Hao Yue, Hu Taiping, Xiang Libin, Zhu Zuoli, Yuan Chunqing, Jia Guiwu, Jia Fuqing, Xu Mingzheng, Huang He, Huang Teng, Cao Lili (female), Cui Lintao, Liang Ping, Jiang Zhuangde, Xie Donggang, Xie Jingrong, Tan Yonghua, Xiong Qunli		
2013	12th	Shangguan Jiqing, Wang Xilin, Wang Jun, Wang Chunxin, Wang Yongchao, Wang Lixia (female, Mongolian), Wang Chen, Wang Manli (female), Wang Fubao, Fang Weifeng, Hu Sishe, Ye Yu (female), Shi Guilu, Feng Yueju (female), Zhu Jingzhi (female), Hua Wei, Liu Xiaoping (female), Liu Kuanren, Jiang Zelin, Sun Qixin, Sun Junliang, ~~Sun Qingyun~~, Sun Wei (female), Li Mei (female), Li Chaoxian, Yang Fengqi, Yang Guanjun (Hui), Yang Haiming, Song Hongwu, Zhang Wentang, Zhang Fuhan, Lu Zhiyuan, Chen Fenxin, Chen Zhu, Chen Chao, Zhou Weijian (female), Zhou Xiling (female, Hui nationality), Zhao Zhengyong, Zhao Jiping, Zhao Chao, Hu Taiping, Hu Chunxia (female), Hu Runze, Jiang Feng, Lou Qinjian, Zhu Xuejun (female), Jia Xuzhi (female), Xu Mingzheng, Xu Xinrong, Xu Qunxian, Xu Delong, Gao Ling, Guo Wenxia (female), Guo Sherong, Guo Qing, Tang Jun, Huang Jun (female), Huang Xiaoping, Cao Jing, Yan Qingwen, Liang Hongxian, Dong Jun, Jiang Zhuangde, Han Baosheng, Yu Xinqiang, Pu Changcheng, Lei Wenfang (female), Tan Yonghua, Xiong Qunli, ~~Yan Junfang (female)~~		
2018	13th	Ding Yunxiang, ~~Shangguan Jiqing~~, Wei Hua (female), Ma Yuhong (female), Ma Baoping, Wang Shuguo, Wang Yongchao, Wang Manli (female), Wang Chaoying, Fang Lan (female), Fang Hongwei, Fang Yan (female), Shi Guangyin, Tian Haorong, Shi Guilu, Bai Hexiang, Ning Qishui, Gong Baoxiong, Lü Jianzhong, Zhu Jingzhi (female), Liu Xiaoyan (female), Liu Shengrong, Liu Zhirang, Liu Guozhong, Liu Kuanren, Sun Wei (female), Li Mingyuan, Li Chunlin, Li Xiaodong, Li Zhi, Yang Changya, Yang Chunlei, Yang Yue, Wu Pute, He Jinbi, He Fei (female) Shen Quan, Song Yaping (female), Song Zhangjun, Zhang Wentang, Zhang Chengzhu (Hui nationality), Zhang Ting, Zhou Weijian (female), Zheng Guangzhao, Zhao Ping, Zhao Mingcui (female), Zhao Jiping, Zhao Junmin, Zhao Chao, Hao Shiling (female), Hu Heping, Hu Chunxia (female), Zan Linsen, He Rong (female), Jia Pingwa, Xu Liping, Xu Qifang, Gao Ling, Guo Wenxia (female), Guo Xiaoyan (female), Gong Guanyu, Cui Ronghua (female), Liang Gui, Han Zheng, Lei Wenfang (female), Chu Jinfeng, Xiong Qunli, Xue Zhanhai .		
2023	14th	Li Ganjie, Xu Hongcai, Xiong Yuanming, Xu Yongjun, Ma Yuhong, Ma Hongli, Ma Xiaoyan, Wang Xuguang, Wang Xingning, Wang Qingfeng, Wang Guogen, Wang Yong, Wang Xiao, Wang Hao, Wang Jing, Fang Lan, Fang Yan, Fu Hao, Bai Hua, Lan Jianwen, Lü Jianzhong, Zhu Xiaoli, Zhuang Changxing, Liu Pan, Shou Xiling, Yan Hanping, Li Yanrong, Li Mingyuan, Yang Zongke, Yang Chunping, Wu Pute, Zou Ruping, Leng Jinsong, Song Yaping, Zhang Weihong, Zhang Wenqi Zhang Pingxiang, Zhang Xiushe, Zhang Shengli, Zhang Ye, Chen Xiaoyong, Zhou Shuguang, Zhao Yide, Zhao Yulong, Zhao Ping, Zhao Gang, Zhao Mingcui, Zhao Jiping, Zhao Xiangmo, Hao Guangyao, Hao Yue, Hu Bingliang, Zhong Baoshen, Xu Datong, Xu Liping, Xu Mingfei, Gao Ling, Guo Dawei, Guo Wensheng, Guo Wenjun, Guo Zhanwu, Guo Wenxia, Guo Shuqin, Ji Guiling, Huang Yunna, Chang Yanling, Cui Ronghua, Fu De, Dong Hongtao, Han Deyang, Fan Jiuping	69	
