= Shaanxi =

Province in Northwestern China

Shaanxi 陕西 Shensi
- Province

Name transcription(s)
  - Abbreviation: SN / 陕 Shǎn / 秦 Qín
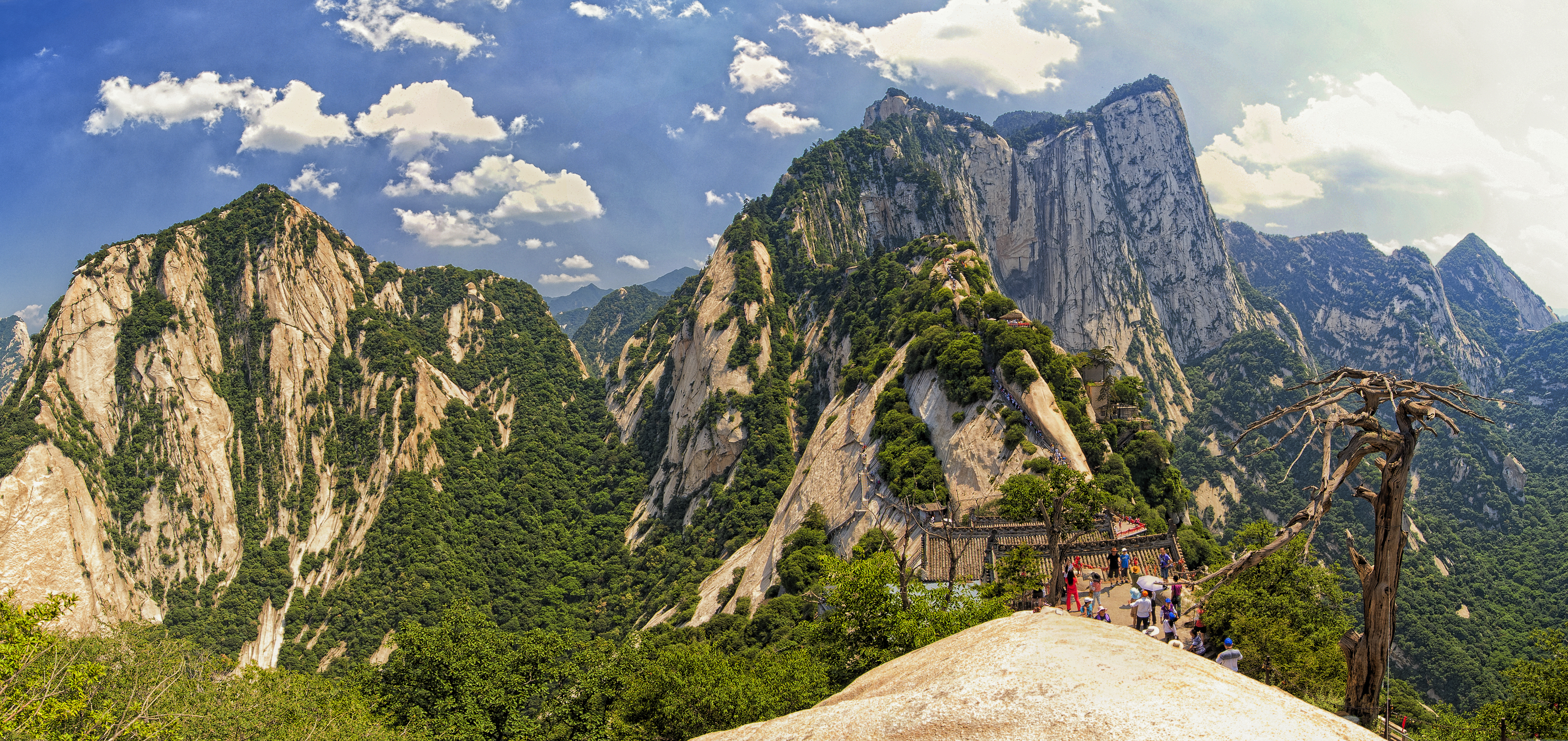
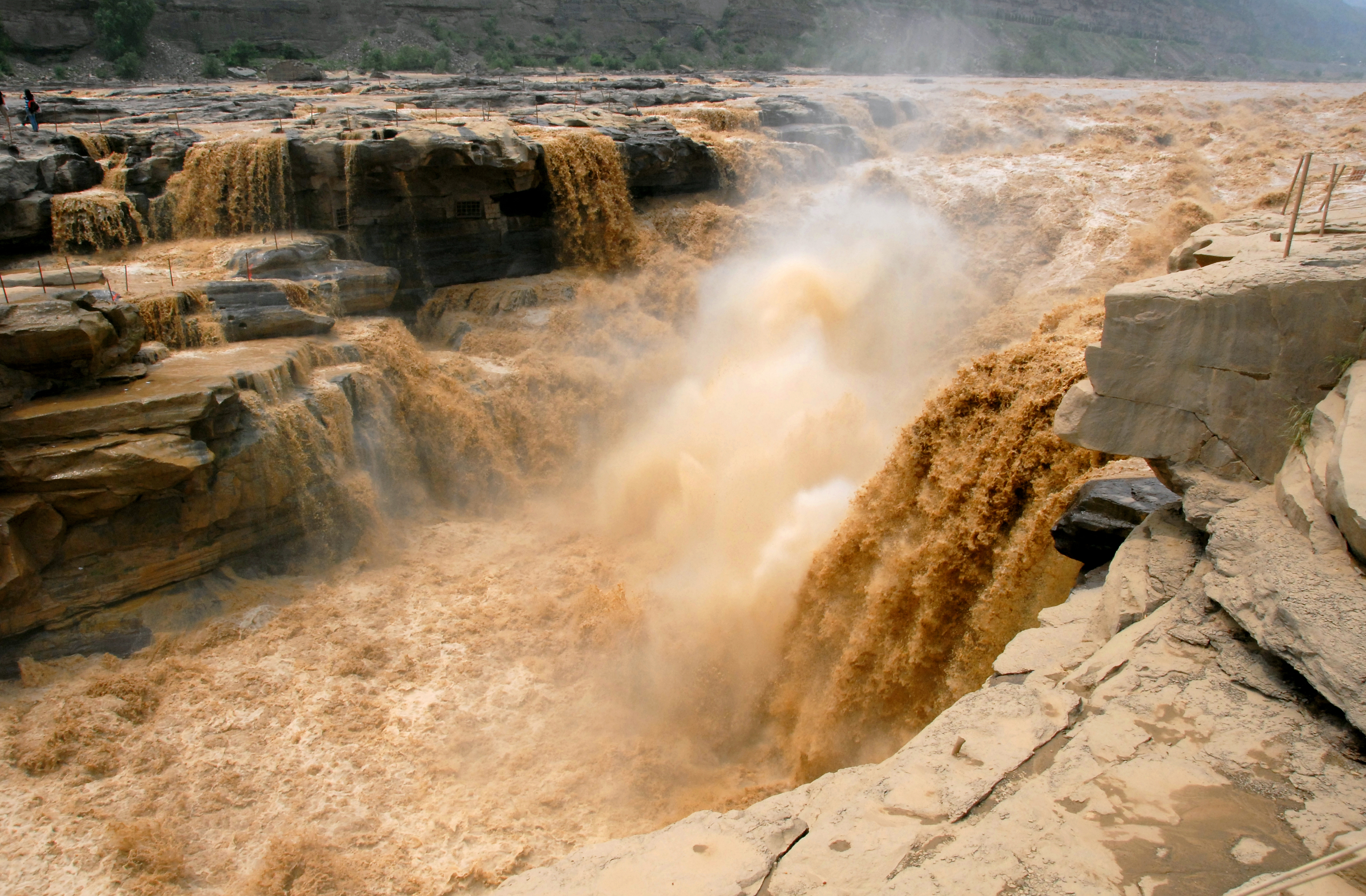
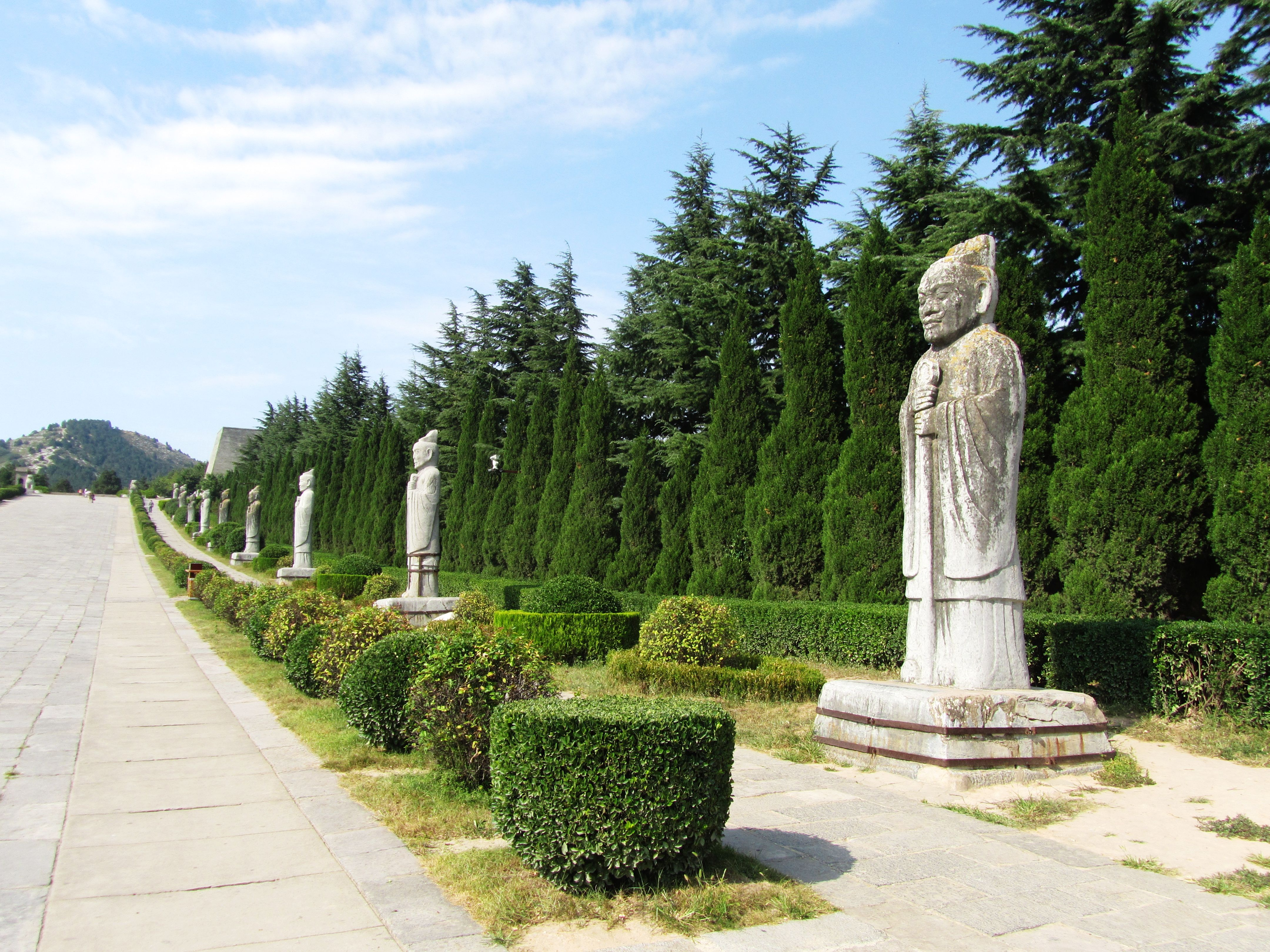
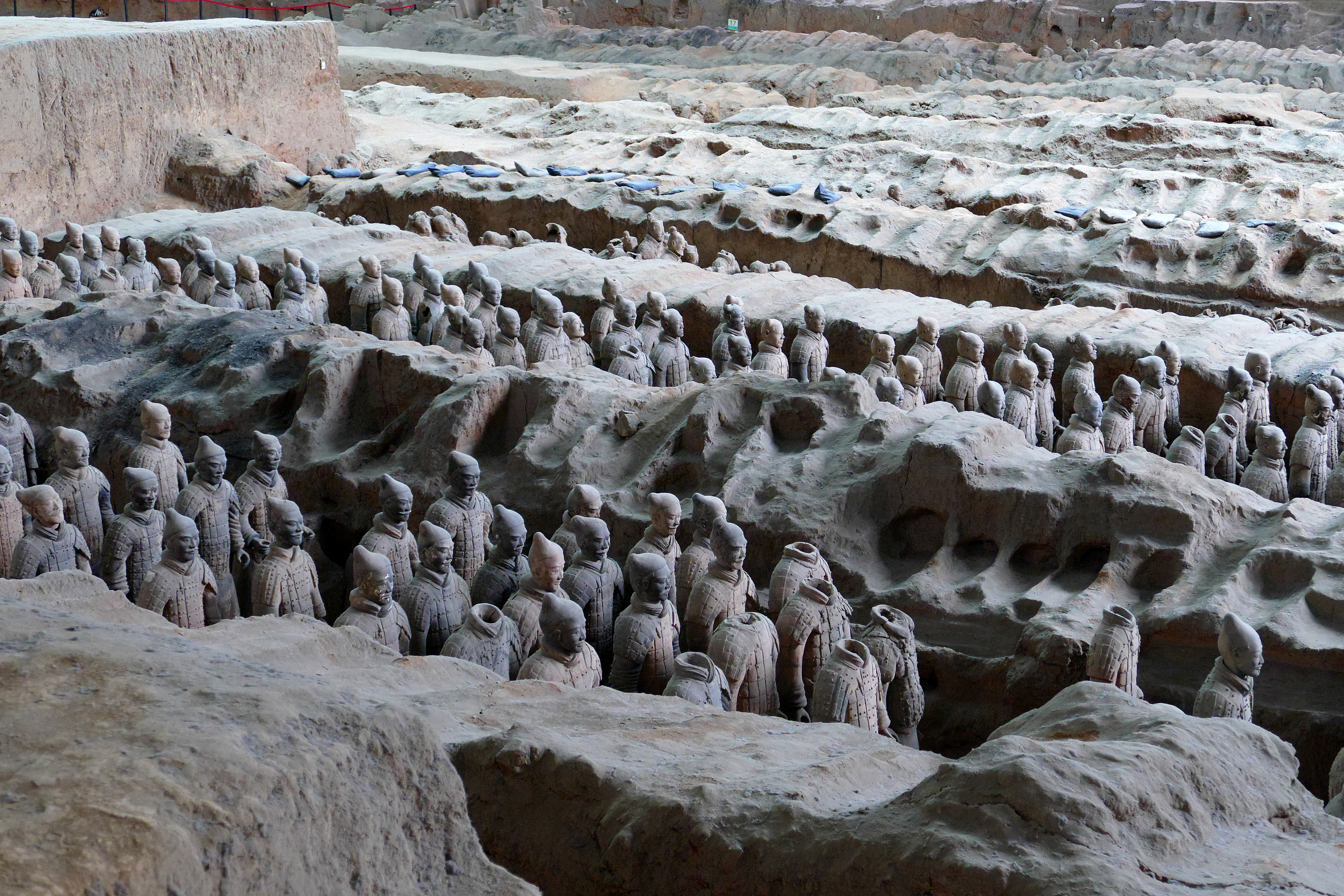
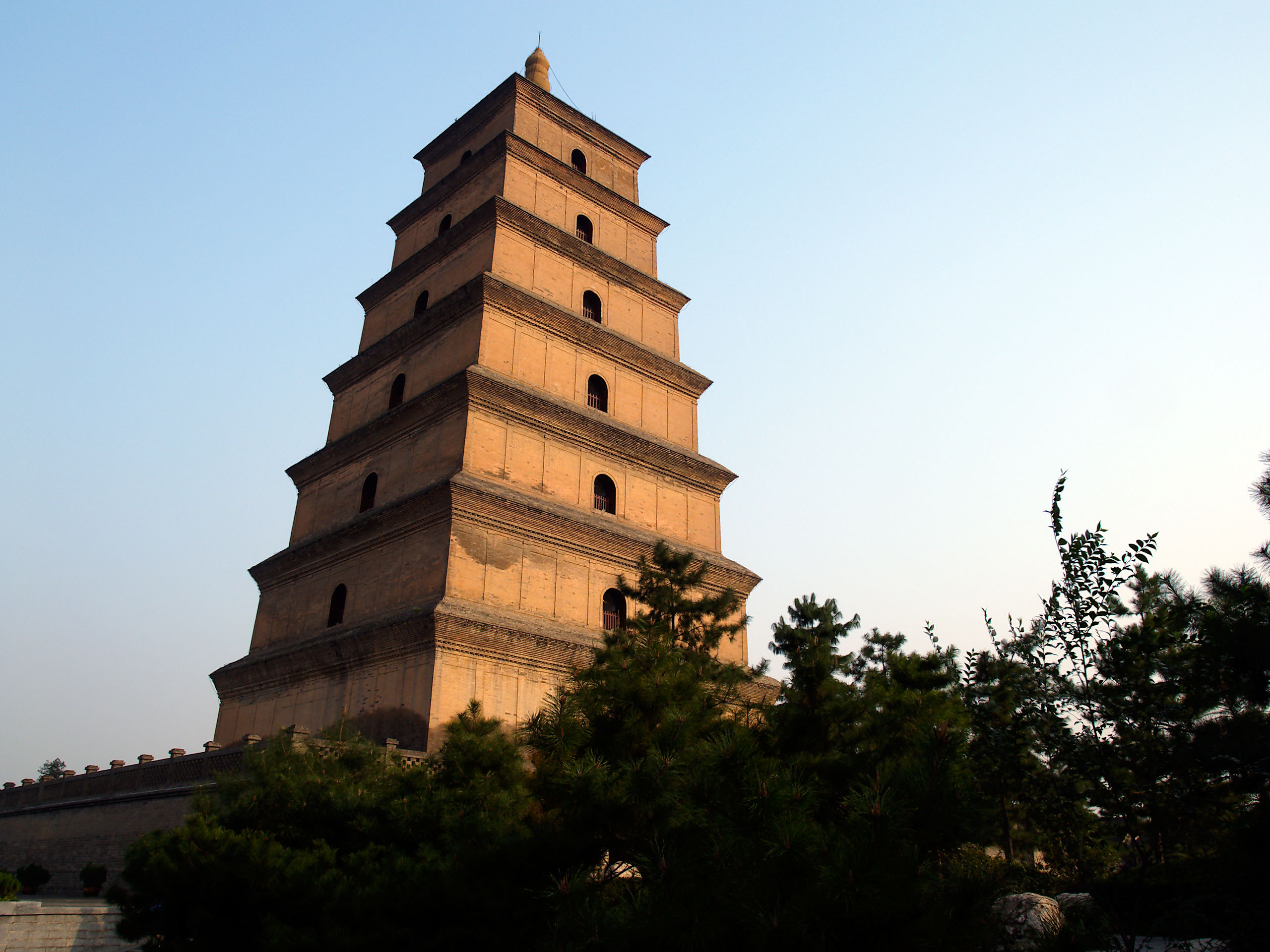
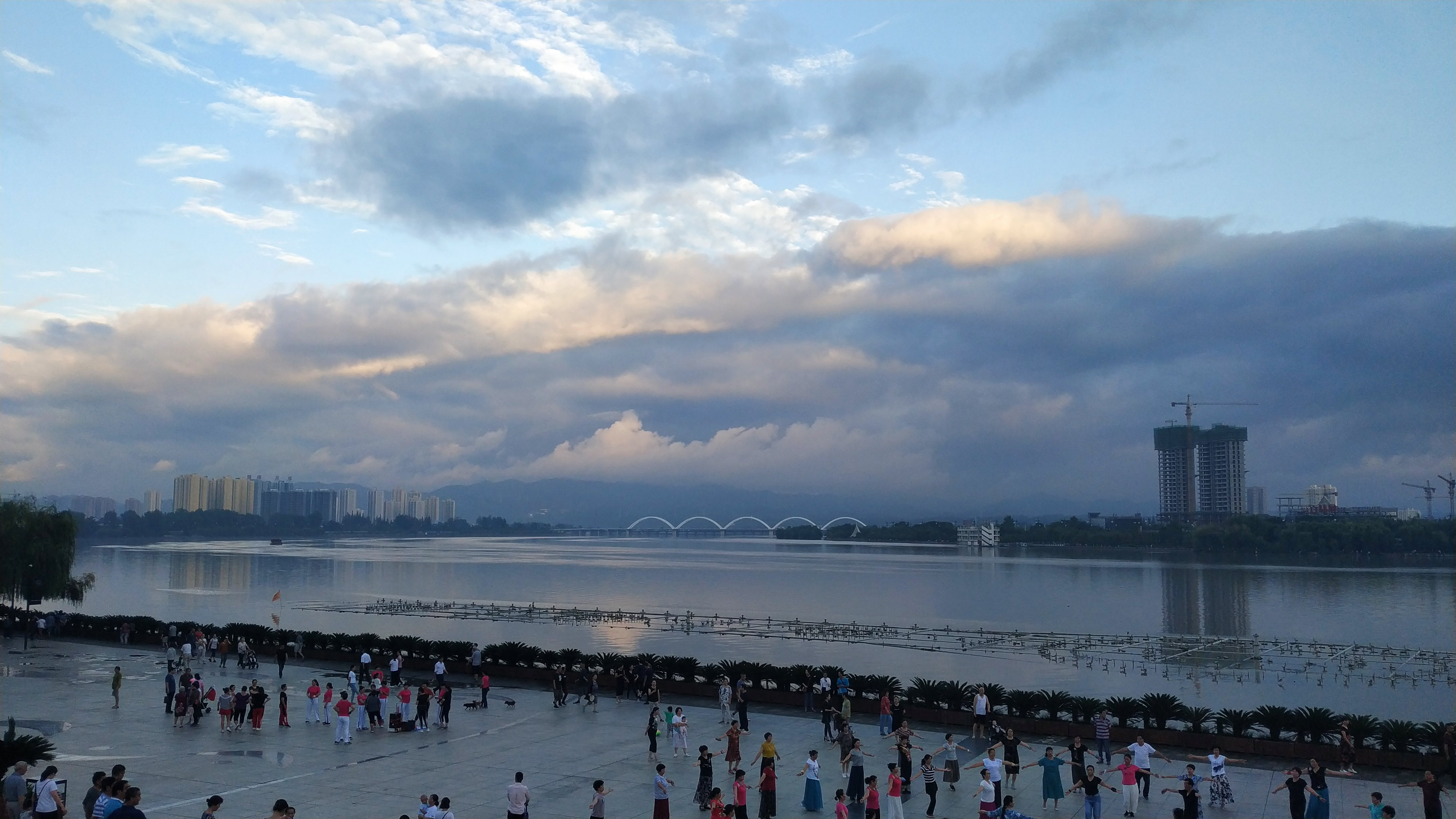
- Mount Hua Hukou Waterfalls Qianling Mausoleum Terracotta Army Giant Wild Goose Pagoda, Xi'an Han River in Hanzhong

- Location of Shaanxi in China
- Coordinates: 35.6°N 109.3°E
- Country: China
- Capital (and largest city): Xi'an
- Divisions: 10 prefectures, 107 counties, 1745 townships

Government
  - Type: Province
  - Body: Shaanxi Provincial People's Congress
  - Party Secretary: Zhao Yide
  - Congress chairman: Zhao Yide
  - Governor: Zhao Gang
  - CPPCC chairman: Xu Xinrong
  - National People's Congress Representation: 69 deputies

Area
  - Total: 205,800 km^{2} (79,500 sq mi)
  - Rank: 11th
- Highest elevation (Mount Taibai): 3,771 m (12,372 ft)

Population (2020)
  - Total: 39,530,000
  - Rank: 16th
  - Density: 192.1/km^{2} (497.5/sq mi)
  - Rank: 21st

Demographics
  - Ethnic composition: Han – 99.5%; Others – 0.5%
  - Languages and dialects: Central Plains Mandarin; Jin Chinese

GDP (2023)
  - Total: CN¥3,779 billion (14th; US$479 billion)
  - Per capita: CN¥85,448 (12th; US$12,126)
- ISO 3166 code: CN-SN
- HDI (2023): 0.802 (12th) – very high
- Website: shaanxi.gov.cn

Shaanxi (Note: /ʃɑːn.ˈʃiː/, alternatively Shensi /ʃɛn.ˈsiː/, see § Name; Chinese: 陕西) is a province in Northwestern China. It borders the province-level divisions of Inner Mongolia to the north; Shanxi and Henan to the east; Hubei, Chongqing, and Sichuan to the south; and Gansu and Ningxia to the west.

Shaanxi covers an area of over 205,000 km^{2} (79,000 sq mi) with about 37 million people, the 16th-largest in China. Xi'an, which includes the sites of the former capitals Fenghao and Chang'an, is the provincial capital and largest city in Northwest China and also one of the oldest cities in China. It is also the oldest of the Four Ancient Capitals, being the capital for the Western Zhou, Western Han, Jin, Sui and Tang dynasties. Xianyang, which served as the capital of the Qin dynasty (221–206 BC), is just north across the Wei River. The other prefecture-level cities into which the province is divided are Ankang, Baoji, Hanzhong, Shangluo, Tongchuan, Weinan, Yan'an and Yulin.

The province is geographically divided into three parts, namely Northern (or "Shaanbei"), Central ("Shaanzhong") and Southern Shaanxi (or "Shaannan"). Northern Shaanxi makes up the southeastern portion of the Ordos Basin and mainly comprises the two prefectural cities of Yulin and Yan'an on the northern Loess Plateau, demarcated from the Ordos Desert and the grasslands of Inner Mongolia's Ordos City by the Ming Great Wall. Central Shaanxi is also known as the Guanzhong region, and comprises the drainage basin of lower Wei River east of Mount Liupan and north of the Qinling Mountains, where the majority of Shaanxi's population reside. Southern Shaanxi comprises the three prefectural cities in the edge of the historical Bashu region south of the Qinling Mountains and includes the three mountainous cities of Hanzhong, Ankang and Shangluo.

The area comprising Shaanxi, Shanxi, and Henan formed the cradle of Chinese civilization. During the Republican era, the city of Yan'an was near the endpoint of the Long March by the Chinese Red Army, who fled from Jiangxi after the Chinese Soviet Republic was destroyed by the Kuomintang armies, and became the birthplace of the Chinese Communist Revolution from late 1935 to early 1947; the Communists formed the Shaan-Gan-Ning Border Region in constituent parts of Shaanxi.

The vast majority of the population of Shaanxi is Han Chinese, with Hui, Manchu and Mongol being the more significant ethnic minorities. Mandarin Chinese is the main spoken language in Shaanxi, including Central Plains Mandarin and Southwestern Mandarin dialects; another variety of Chinese, Jin Chinese, is also spoken in the regions neighboring Shanxi.

Shaanxi is China's 15th largest economy, ranking within the middle tier among China's administrative divisions. The fossil fuel and high technology sectors compose the two largest industries in Shaanxi Province. The high technology sector includes aircraft and aerospace industries and Shaanxi produces more than 50% of the R&D and manufacturing equipment for the country's domestic commercial aviation industry.

== Name ==
Language	Pronunciation	
Language	陝西	山西
Jin Chinese	[ʂje sɛe̯]	[sã sɛe̯]
13th-century Mandarin	[ʃem si]	[ʃan si]
Xi'an Mandarin	[ʂæ̃ ɕi]	[sæ̃ ɕi]
Beijing Mandarin	[ʂan ɕi]	

The meaning of the province, 'west of Shan', is attested c. 1000 BC, when the dukes of Shao and Zhou marked their borders along the Shan plateau (陝塬). In Chinese typing, the toponym 陝 often got mixed up with 'valley' 陜 (note: distinguish 㚒 and 夾). Simplified characters merged the two as 陕.

Shaanxi
- "Shaanxi" in simplified (top) and traditional (bottom) Chinese characters
- Simplified Chinese: 陕西
- Traditional Chinese: 陝西
- Postal: Shensi
- Literal meaning: "West of the Shan Pass"
Transcriptions
Standard Mandarin
- Hanyu Pinyin: Shǎnxī
- Wade–Giles: Shan^{3}-hsi^{1}
- IPA: [ʂàn.ɕí]
Yue: Cantonese
- Yale Romanization: Símsāi
- Jyutping: Sim2-sai1
- IPA: [sim˧˥.sɐj˥]
Southern Min
- Hokkien POJ: Siám-sai

The romanizations of Shaanxi (陝西) and its neighboring province Shanxi (山西) are troublesome in Beijing Mandarin because their pronunciation differs only in tone (rendered as Shǎnxī and Shānxī in pinyin transcription, 1958). To avoid confusion, mainland China recognized the Gwoyeu Romatzyh transcription (1928) for 陝, "Shaan".

Nonetheless, the vowels and consonants of shǎn 陝 and shān 山 are distinguished in the more conservative Jin Chinese languages native to the two provinces. This conservative phonology is reflected in the historical spelling of Shaanxi, "Shensi", known to the Europeans in the 18th century. "Shensi" was recognized in the 1906 Chinese postal romanization and continued to be popular until 1987, when the People's Republic of China banned romanizations made before their establishment.

== History ==
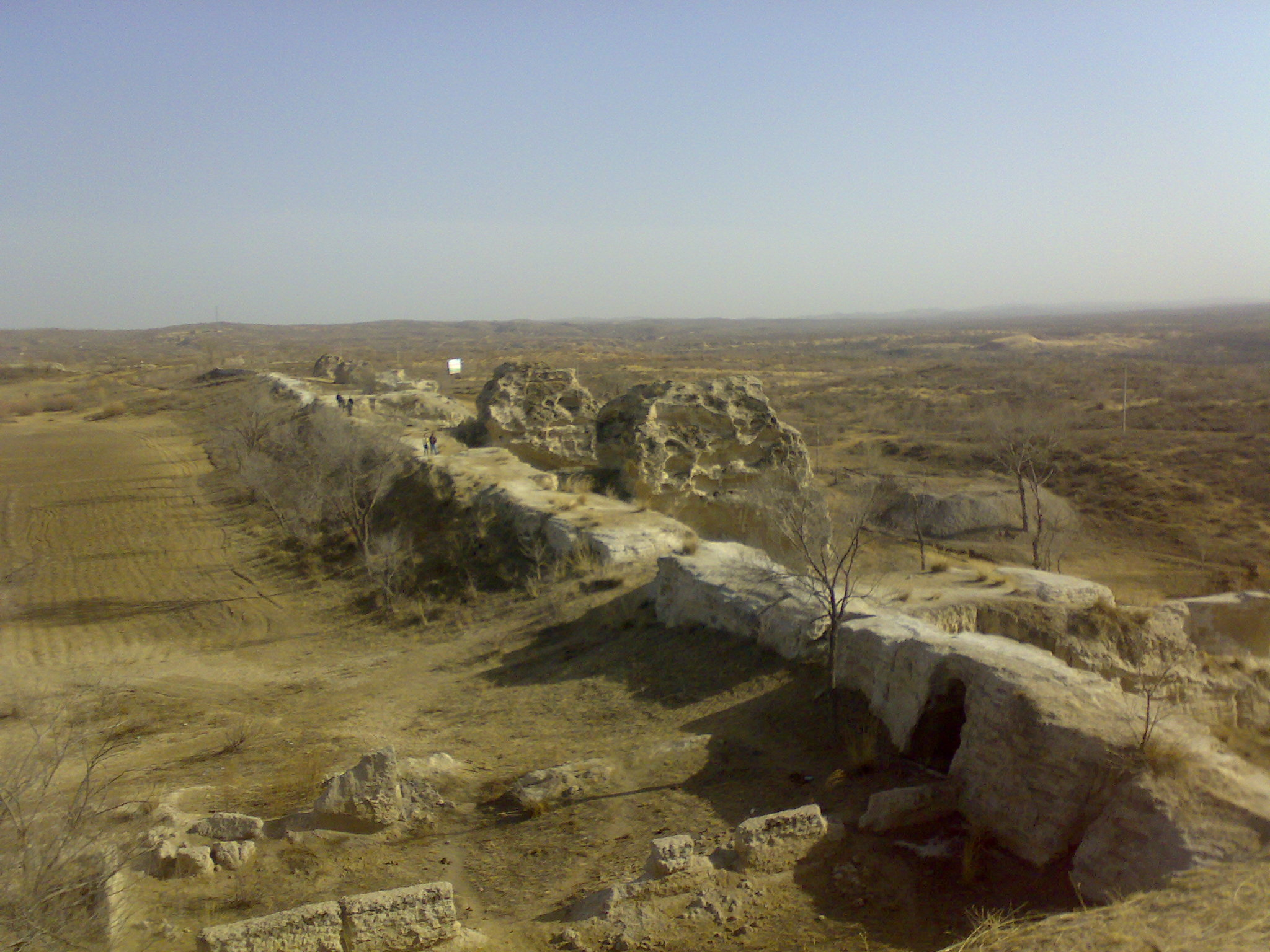
Tongwancheng, capital of Northern Xia (407–431)

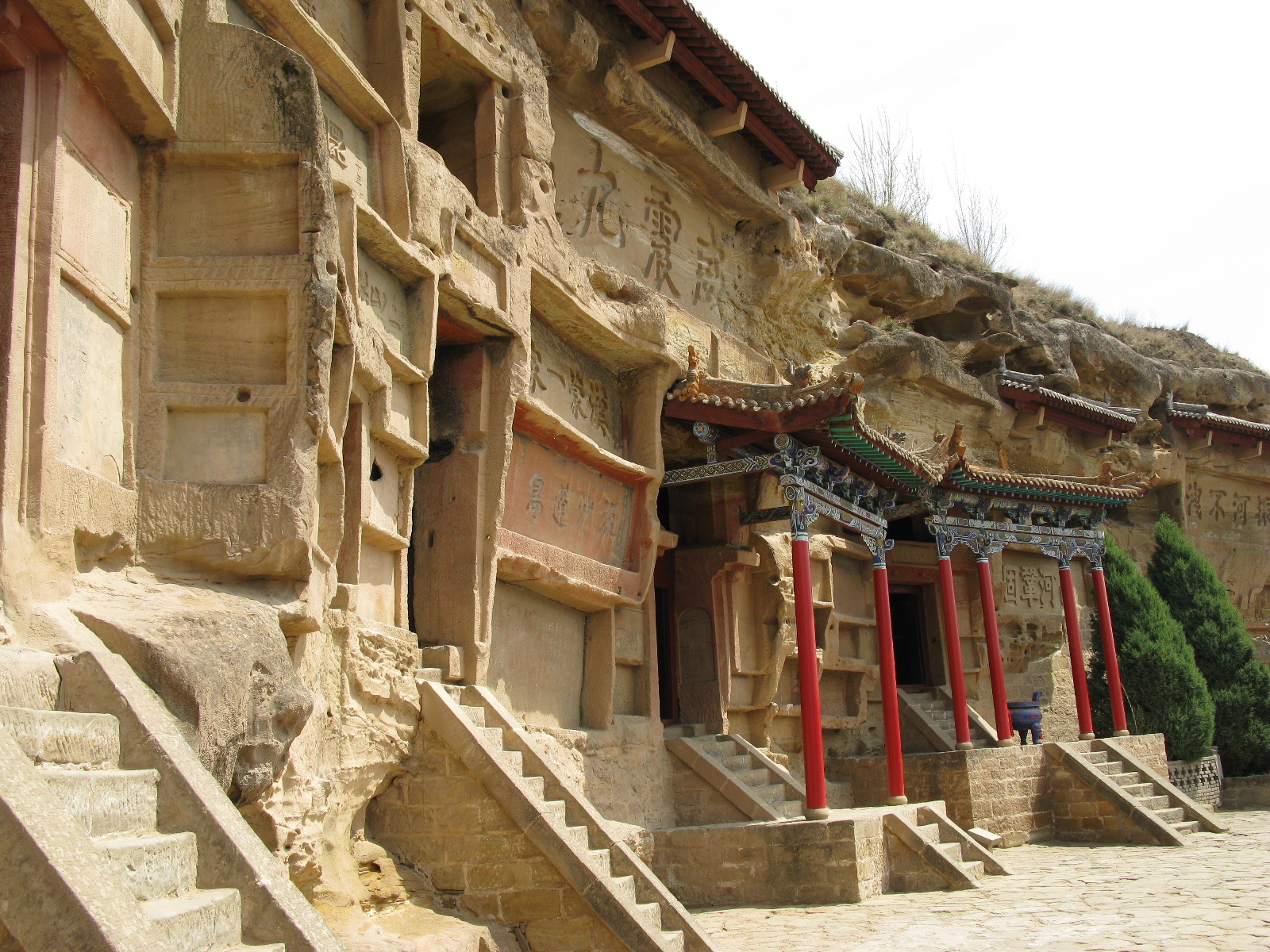
Cliff inscriptions in Red Stone Gorge from 1587 to 1949

A typical yaodong residence

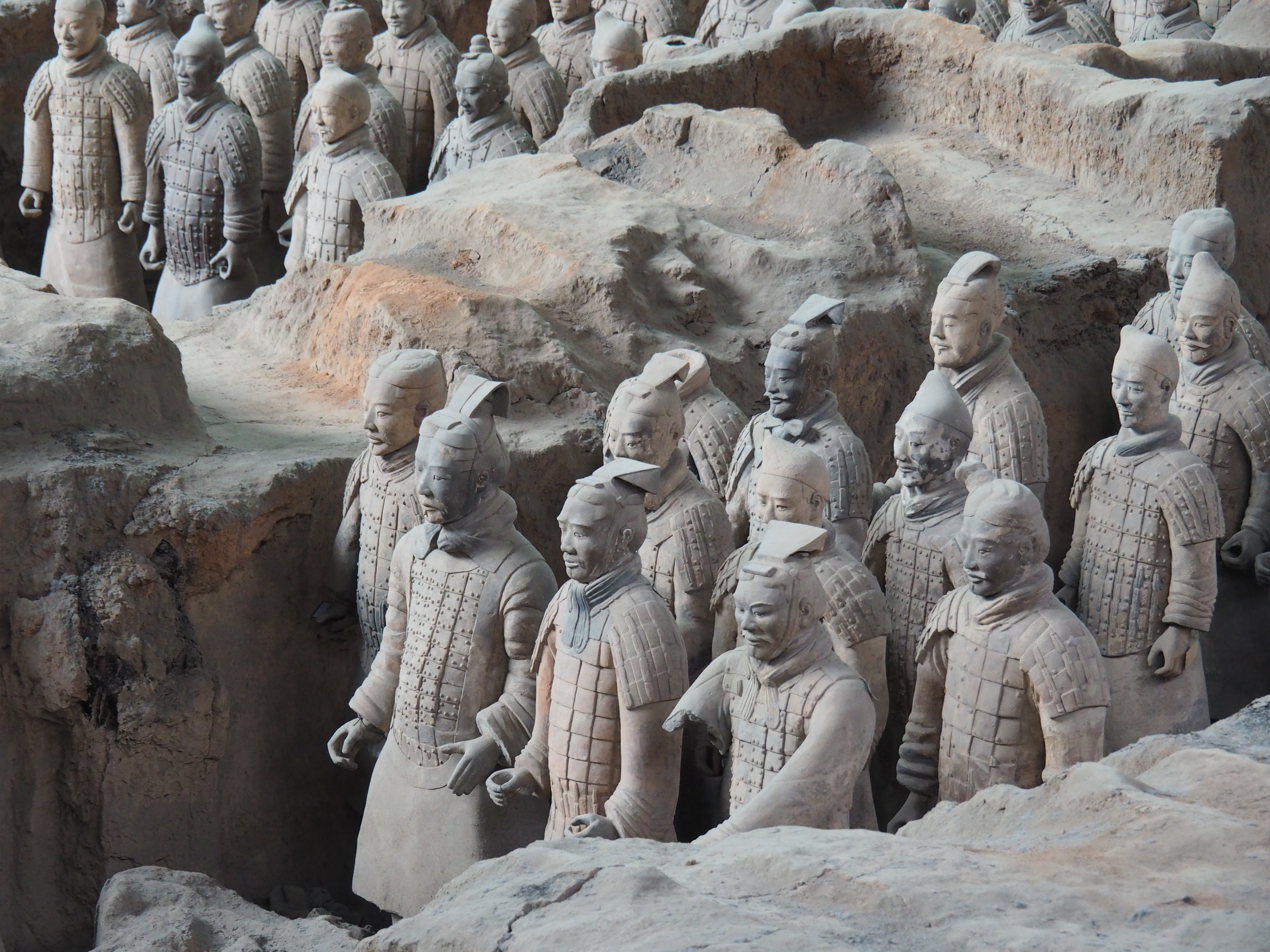
Terracotta Warriors

Shaanxi is considered one of the cradles of Chinese civilization. Thirteen feudal dynasties established their capitals in the province during a span of more than 1,100 years, from the Zhou dynasty to the Tang dynasty.

The province's principal city and current capital, Xi'an, is one of the four great ancient capitals of China and is the eastern terminus of the Silk Road, which leads to Europe, the Arabian Peninsula, and Africa.

The region was briefly governed as the Three Qins after the fall of the Qin dynasty. This is the origin of one of Shaanxi's two abbreviations, 秦 (Qin), the other being 陝 (Shaan). Then it was conquered by Liu Bang during the Chu-Han Contention. Under the Han dynasty, the Northern Silk Road was expanded to advance exploration and military purposes to the west. This Northern Silk Road is the northernmost of the Silk Roads and is about 2,600 kilometres (1,600 mi) in length. It connected the ancient Chinese capital of Xi'an to the west over the Wushao Ling Pass to Wuwei and emerging in Kashgar before linking to ancient Parthia.

The Xiongnu-led kingdom Northern Xia (407–431) set its capital in Tongwancheng.

The Northern Song dynasty and the Tangut-led Western Xia contested their border in Shaanxi. Western Xia found the Luōwùchéng (罗兀城) frontier fort in 1071 but was taken by Song in 1081.

Under the Ming dynasty, Shaanxi was established with the founding of the Shaanxi Provincial Administration Commission in 1376, whose administration also included the modern provinces of Gansu, Ningxia, and part of Qinghai. During this dynasty, most visitors from Central and West Asia entered the country via Shaanxi.

One of the most devastating earthquakes in history occurred near Hua Shan in southeastern Shaanxi on 23 January 1556, killing an estimated 100,000 people and causing a regional reduction in population by an estimated 830,000 due to emigration and famine (see 1556 Shaanxi earthquake).

The end of the short-lived Jiangxi Soviet signaled the beginning of the Long March by Mao Zedong and the Chinese Communists to the Shaanxi Soviet at Yan'an.

The administrative evolution of Shaanxi: The Northern Song established the Shaanxi Lu (circuit), governed from modern Xi'an in 997. The Yuan dynasty established Shaanxi Province (Yuan dynasty), governed by a Branch Secretariat in 1286. After the founding of the Qing dynasty, Gansu was split from Shaanxi, but both provinces were governed under the Viceroy of Shaan-Gan.

=== Prehistoric site ===
The Lantian Man site, with hominin fossils from approximately one million years ago, was found in Lantian County in northwestern Shaanxi province, near the city of Xi'an. Scientists classify Lantian Man as a subspecies of Homo erectus. The fossils are displayed at the Shaanxi History Museum, Xi'an, China.

== Geography ==
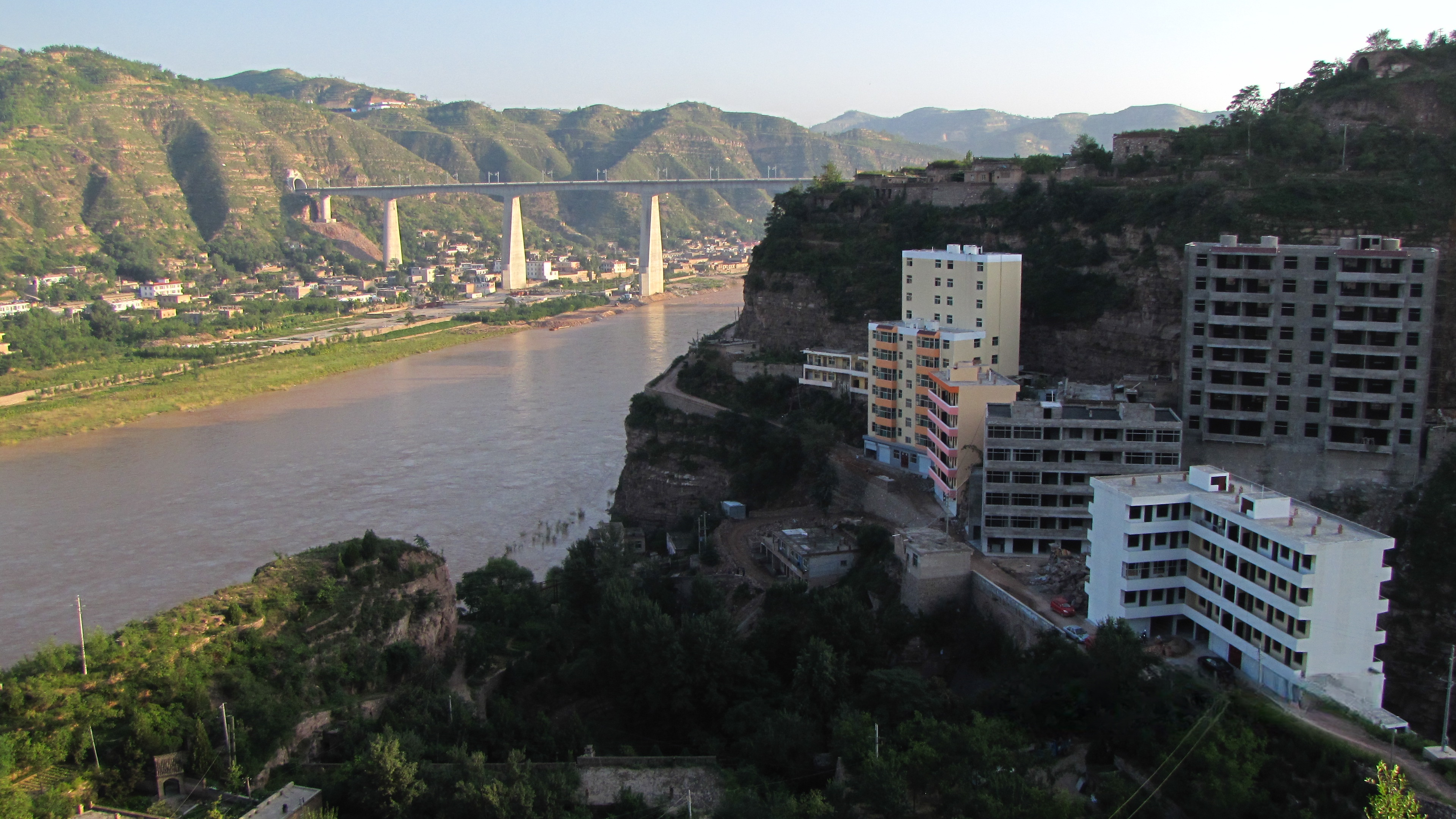
The Yellow River is the natural provincial border between Wubu, Shaanxi (right) and Liulin, Shanxi (left), both being the heartland of Jin Chinese language. The Taiyuan–Zhongwei–Yinchuan railway ran across the bridge.

The geography of the area is described as being part of the Ordos Desert in the north along the border with Inner Mongolia, the Loess Plateau in the central part of the province, the Qin Mountains (Qinling) running east to west in the south central part, and subtropical climate south of the Qinling. In between the Loess Plateau and the Qinling lies the Wei River Valley, or Guanzhong, a cradle of early Chinese civilization.

Going clockwise, Shaanxi borders Shanxi (E, NE), Henan (E), Hubei (SE), Chongqing (S), Sichuan (SW), Gansu (W), Ningxia (NW), and Inner Mongolia (N). In terms of number of bordering provincial-level divisions, Shaanxi ties Inner Mongolia.

Due to its large span in latitude, Shaanxi has a variety of climates. Under the Köppen climate classification, the northern parts, including the Loess Plateau, have either a cold arid (Köppen BWk) or cold semi-arid (Köppen BSk), with cold and very dry winters, dry springs and autumns, and hot, humid summers. The area known as Guanzhong is mostly semi-arid, though there are a few areas with a humid subtropical climate (Köppen Cwa), with cool to cold winters, and hot, humid summers that often see early-season heatwaves. The southern portion is much more humid and lies in the humid subtropical zone, with more temperate winters and long, hot, humid summers. Annual mean temperature is roughly between 8 and 16 °C (46 and 61 °F), with January temperatures ranging from −11 to 3.5 °C (12.2 to 38.3 °F) and July temperatures ranging from 21 to 28 °C (70 to 82 °F).

Besides the provincial capital of Xi'an, other cities include: Baoji, Hanzhong, Lintong, Tongchuan, Xianyang, Yan'an and Ankang.

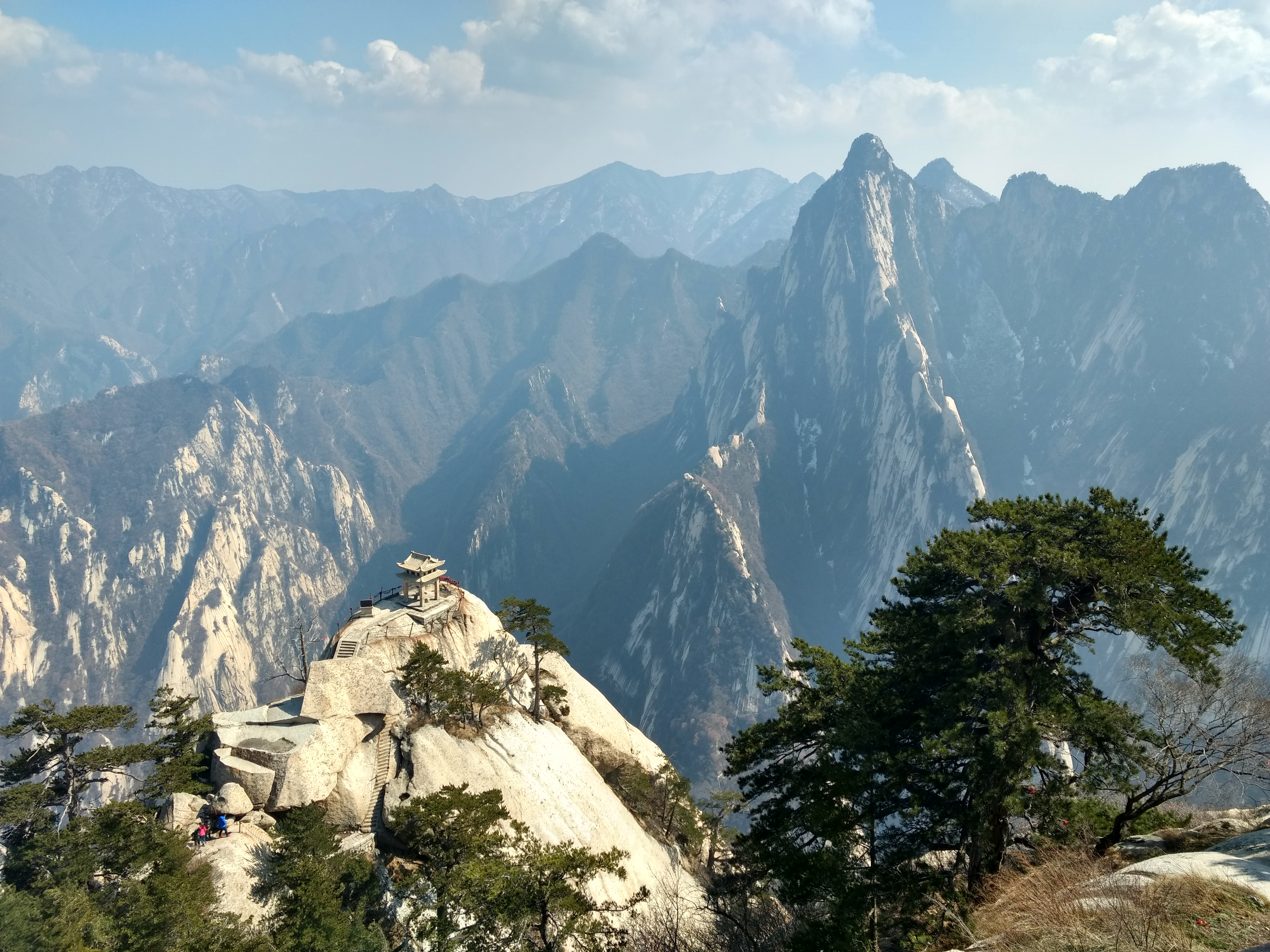
Mount Hua

== Administrative divisions ==
Shaanxi consists of ten prefecture-level divisions: all prefecture-level cities (including a sub-provincial city):

Administrative divisions of Shaanxi
Division code	Division	Area in km^{2}	Population 2010	Seat	Divisions		
Division code	Division	Area in km^{2}	Population 2010	Seat	Districts	Counties	CL cities
610000	Shaanxi Province	205,800.00	37,327,378	Xi'an city	30	71	6
610100	Xi'an city	10,096.81	8,467,837	Weiyang District	11	2	
610200	Tongchuan city	3,884.81	834,437	Yaozhou District	3	1	
610300	Baoji city	18,116.93	3,716,731	Jintai District	3	9	
610400	Xianyang city	10,323.99	4,894,834	Qindu District	3	9	2
610500	Weinan city	13,030.56	5,286,077	Linwei District	2	7	2
610600	Yan'an city	37,030.54	2,187,009	Baota District	2	10	1
610700	Hanzhong city	27,096.43	3,416,196	Hantai District	2	9	
610800	Yulin city	42,920.18	3,351,437	Yuyang District	2	9	1
610900	Ankang city	23,536.31	2,629,906	Hanbin District	1	9	
611000	Shangluo city	19,587.31	2,341,742	Shangzhou District	1	6	
Sub-provincial cities

Administrative divisions in Chinese and varieties of romanizations
English	Chinese	Pinyin
Shaanxi Province	陕西省	Shǎnxī Shěng
Xi'an city	西安市	Xī'ān Shì
Tongchuan city	铜川市	Tóngchuān Shì
Baoji city	宝鸡市	Bǎojī Shì
Xianyang city	咸阳市	Xiányáng Shì
Weinan city	渭南市	Wèinán Shì
Yan'an city	延安市	Yán'ān Shì
Hanzhong city	汉中市	Hànzhōng Shì
Yulin city	榆林市	Yúlín Shì
Ankang city	安康市	Ānkāng Shì
Shangluo city	商洛市	Shāngluò Shì

The ten prefecture-level cities of Shaanxi are subdivided into 107 county-level divisions (30 districts, four county-level cities, and 73 counties).

Population by urban areas of prefecture & county cities
#	Cities	2020 Urban area	2010 Urban area	2020 City proper
1	Xi'an	9,392,938	5,206,253 (Note: New districts established after 2010 census: Gaoling (Gaoling County), Huyi (Huxian County). These new districts not included in the urban area count of the pre-expanded city.)	12,183,280
2	Xianyang (Note: Yangling is a satellite urban area separated from Xianyang and it is not included in the urban area count.)	1,192,776	730,704	4,983,340
3	Baoji	1,107,702	871,940	3,321,853
4	Yulin	884,292	429,189 (Note: New district established after 2010 census: Hengshan (Hengshan County). The new district not included in the urban area count of the pre-expanded city.)	3,624,750
5	Hanzhong	673,476	350,167 (Note: New district established after 2010 census: Nanzheng (Nanzheng County). The new district not included in the urban area count of the pre-expanded city.)	3,211,462
6	Weinan	642,594	347,484 (Note: New district established after 2010 census: Huazhou (Huaxian County). The new district not included in the urban area count of the pre-expanded city.)	4,688,744
7	Yan'an	577,851	336,856 (Note: New district established after 2010 census: Ansai (Ansai County). The new district not included in the urban area count of the pre-expanded city.)	2,282,581
8	Ankang	514,068	379,707	2,493,436
9	Tongchuan	417,324	463,866	698,322
10	Shenmu	403,133	(Note: Shenmu County is currently known as Shenmu CLC after 2010 census.)	see Yulin
11	Xingping	309,463	247,539	see Xianyang
12	Hancheng	268,583	196,574	see Weinan
13	Shangluo	228,426	156,781	2,041,231
14	Yangling	169,254	104,944	see Xianyang
15	Binzhou	160,298	(Note: Binxian County is currently known as Binzhou CLC after 2010 census.)	see Xianyang
16	Zichang	160,298	(Note: Zichang County is currently known as Zichang CLC after 2010 census.)	see Yan'an
17	Huayin	109,472	127,987	see Weinan

== Politics ==
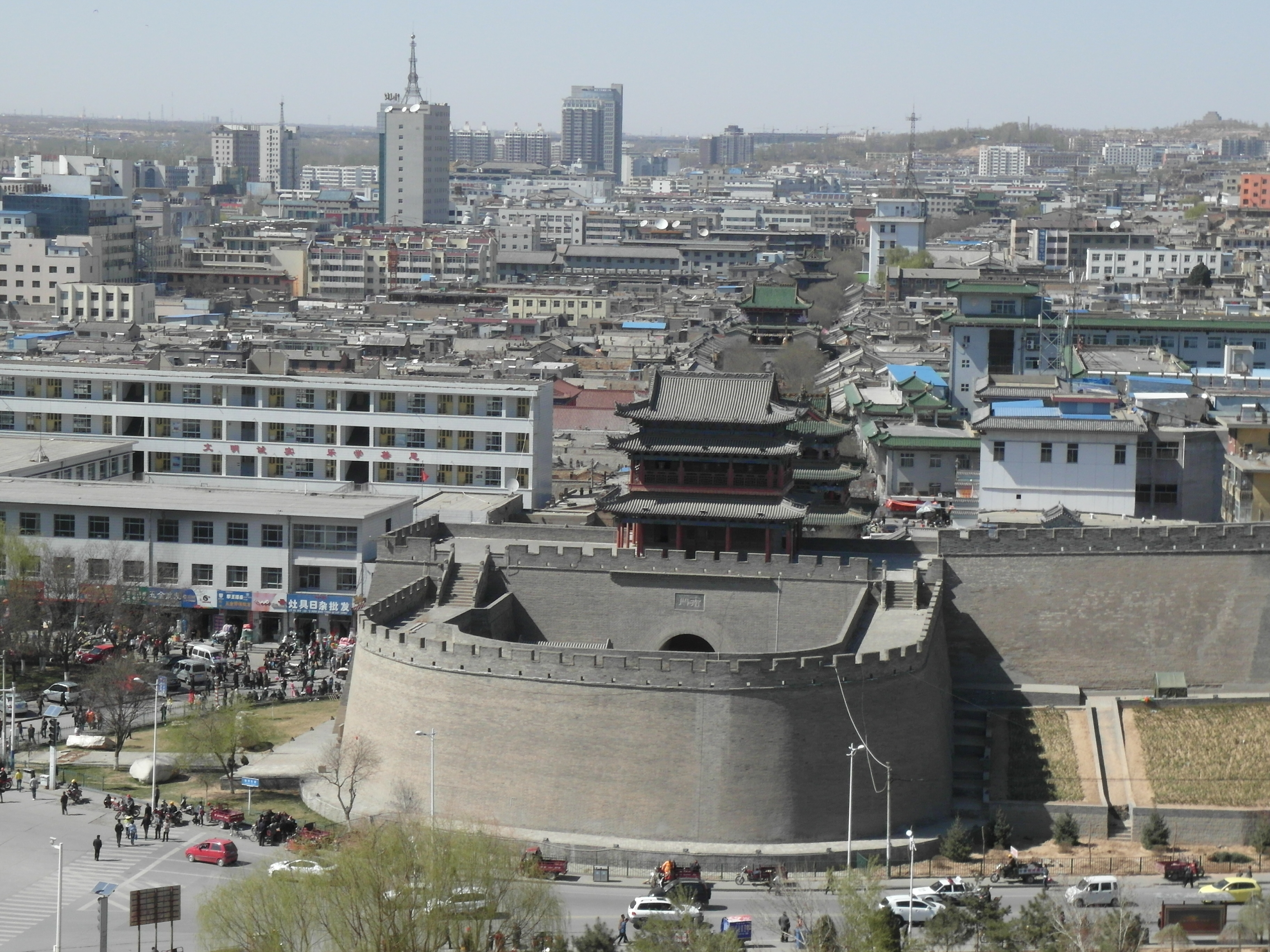
Walled City of Yulin, Shaanxi.

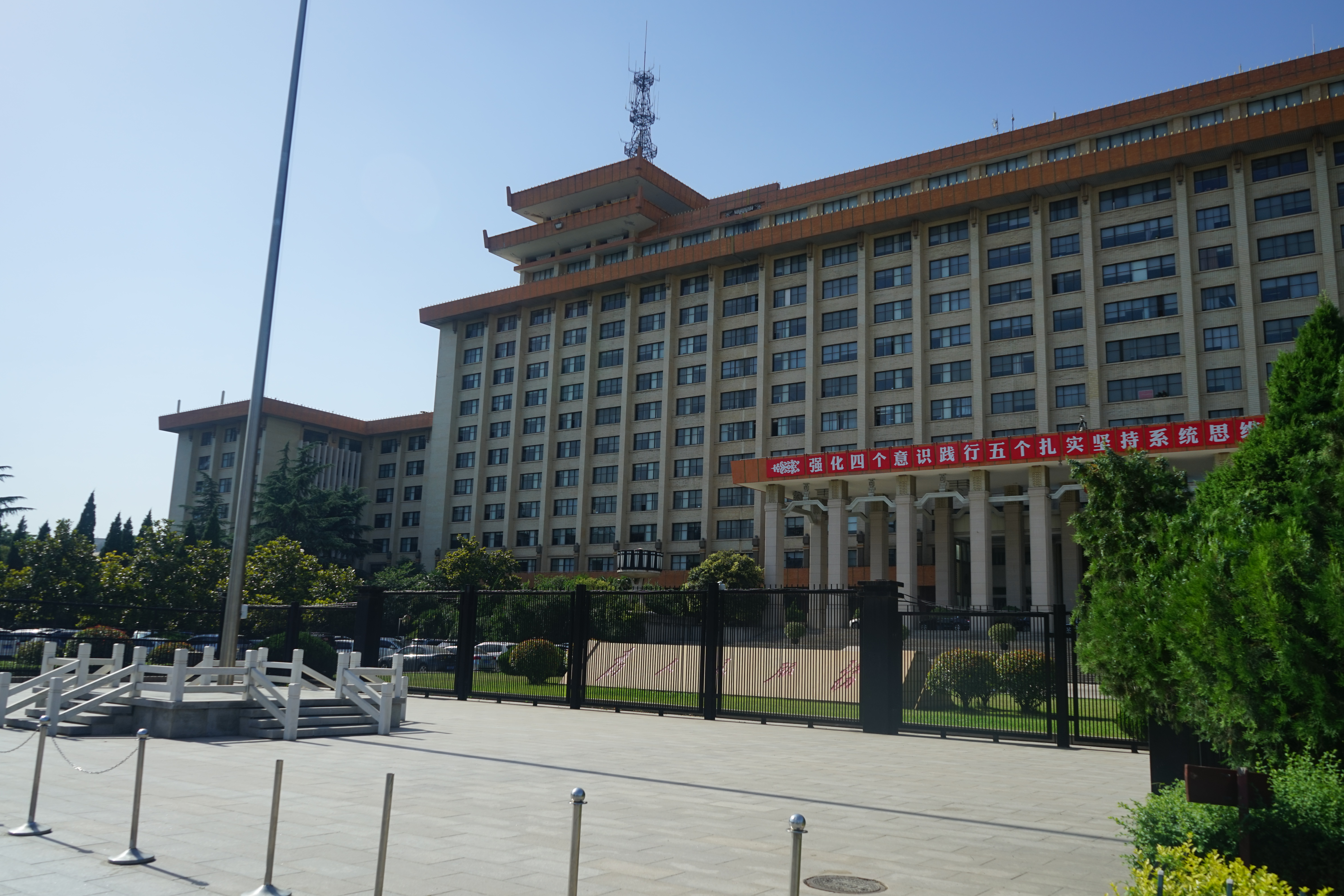
Shaanxi People's Government

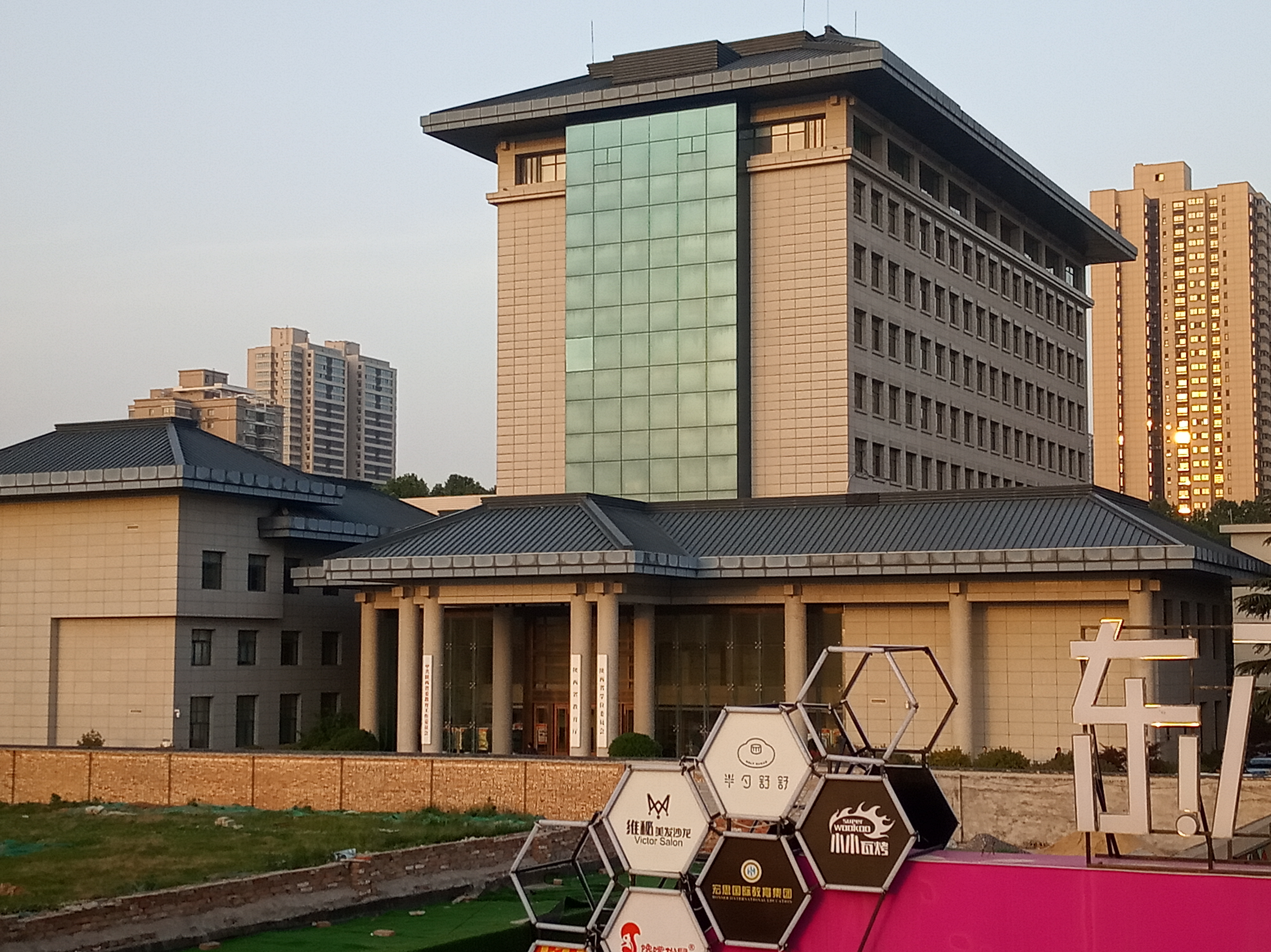
Education Department of Shaanxi Province

The politics of Shaanxi is structured in a triple party-government system like all other governing institutions in mainland China.

The Governor of Shaanxi is the highest-ranking official in the People's Government of Shaanxi. However, in the province's dual party-government governing system, the Governor is considered to have less power than the Shaanxi Chinese Communist Party Provincial Committee Secretary; since the Governor is always ranked as the First-Deputy Secretary in the Shaanxi Chinese Communist Party Provincial Committee.

Shaanxi was established as a provincial government since Qing dynasty. On 10 January 1950, the People's Government of Shaanxi was established in Xi'an. Ma Minfang was then appointed as the first Governor of Shaanxi.

== Economy ==
As of the mid-19th century, Shaanxi exported animal skins, wine, liquor, and musk. Money loans were also common, with Shaanxi business people involved in the Guangzhou loan business. Shaanxi commonly imported European animal skins, watches, Chinese language books, and cloth.

Shaanxi was a major recipient of China's investment in industrial capacity during the Third Front campaign.

The fossil fuel and high technology sectors compose the two largest industries in Shaanxi province. During 2009, the province ranked third in China for production of coal, natural gas and crude oil. As the home of several of the leading universities and research institutes in Western China, Shaanxi province also plays a major role in China's burgeoning aircraft and aerospace industries, producing more than 50% of the R&D and manufacturing equipment for the country's domestic commercial air industry. Nominal GDP for 2011 was 1,239 billion RMB (US$196.7 billion) and GDP per capita was 21,729 RMB (US$3,179), ranking 17th in the PRC.

In the first half of 2019, Shaanxi's total production value reached 1,162.557 billion yuan, a year-on-year increase of 5.4%. The added value of the primary industry was 55.319 billion yuan, an increase of 4.5%; the second industry was 557.935 billion yuan, an increase of 4.2%; the tertiary industry was 549.303 billion yuan, an increase of 6.8%.

=== Economic and technological development zones ===
==== Baoji Hi-Tech Industrial Development Zone ====
Established in 1992, Baoji Hi-Tech Industrial Development Zone was approved as a national hi-tech zone by the State Council. It has a long-term planned area of 40 km^{2} (15 sq mi). The transportation system around the zone includes Xi'an-Xianyang International Airport and National Highway 310, and industries operating within the zone include auto parts, electronics, IT, pharmaceuticals and bioengineering industries and new materials.

==== Shaanxi Xi'an Export Processing Zone ====
Shaanxi Xi'an Export Processing Zone (XEPZ) was approved on 21 June 2002 by the State Council for its establishment and was put on 5 April 2004. As the first state-level export processing zone in northwest China, XEPZ has become one of the seven pioneer EPZs with the function of bonded logistics in China. XEPZ is under the leadership of the Administrative Committee of Xi'an Economic and Technological Development Zone (XETDZ), which is designated by Xi'an municipal government to exercise economic and administrative power within the zone. XEPZ is a special economic zone. By now, there are more than 40 enterprises home and abroad settled in XEPZ. The pillar industries feature aviation, machinery, electronics and new energy.

==== Western Triangle ====
The Western Triangle is a new economic zone composing the three major city-level economies of Western China: Xi'an, Chongqing and Chengdu. It is believed that the addition of Xi'an to the Triangle will spur economic growth in the region and allow the city an opportunity to capitalize on the commercial potential of its high-technology industries.

==== Xi'an Economic and Technological Development Zone ====
Established in 1993, Xi'an Economic and Technology Development Zone was approved as a national zone in 2000. The zone is 20 minutes from Xi'an Xianyang International Airport, and national highways pass through. It has formed four pillar industries: automotive, electronics, food, and new materials industries. So far, the zone has attracted more than 1,700 enterprises.

==== Xi'an High-tech Industrial Development Zone ====
Xi'an HTDZ opened its gates in 1991. It was established as a "pivotal location" for investment by high-tech industry companies in central and northwest China. Established in 1991, Xi'an Hi-Tech Industrial Development Zone is a national high-tech zone. It is surrounded by national highways and it is 30 minutes from Xi'an-Xianyang International Airport. Furthermore, it is ranked in the top three high-tech zones in China.

==== Xi'an Software Park ====
Xi'an Software Park, established in December 1998, is the professional park for Xi'an to develop scale software and service outsourcing industries. The park has been appraised as a software industry base under the National Torch Program, national software industry base, national software export base, city demonstrational area of national service outsourcing base. It is one of the four parks with "double bases" of software in China. Xi'an Software Park assembles 90% of enterprises engaging in software and service outsourcing in Xi'an. There were nearly 780 companies, of which foreign-funded enterprises account for 170, and over 71,000 jobholders in the park by the end of 2008.

==== Yangling Agriculture Hi-Tech Industrial Zone ====
Yangling Agriculture Hi-Tech Industrial Zone was approved as a national-level hi-tech development zone by State Council in 1997. It is 82 km (51 mi) from Xi'an to the east and 70 km (43 mi) from Xi'an Xianyang International Airport.

== Demographics ==
Nearly all the people in Shaanxi are ethnic Han Chinese, with pockets of Hui population in the northwestern region (adjacent to Ningxia). Shaanxi province is one of the centers of ancient Chinese civilization. The central part of Shaanxi, known as Guanzhong, where the provincial capital Xi'an is located, is more populous compared to the others (Shaannan and Shaanbei).

Historical population

Year	Pop.	±%
1912	9,364,000	—
1928	11,802,000	+26.0%
1936–37	9,780,000	−17.1%
1947	10,011,000	+2.4%
1954	15,881,281	+58.6%
1964	20,766,915	+30.8%

Year	Pop.	±%
1982	28,904,423	+39.2%
1990	32,882,403	+13.8%
2000	35,365,072	+7.6%
2010	37,327,378	+5.5%
2020	39,528,999	+5.9%

Xi'an part of Shaanxi Province until 1947; dissolved in 1954 and incorporated into Shaanxi Province.

Largest cities in Shaanxi Source: China Urban Construction Statistical Yearbook 2018 Urban Population and Urban Temporary Population
Rank		Pop.	Rank		Pop.
1	Xi'an	5,866,100	11	Xingping	225,800
2	Xianyang	1,023,100	12	Shenmu	211,800
3	Baoji	893,200	13	Hancheng	173,200
4	Yulin	631,100	14	Yangling	154,900
5	Hanzhong	569,500	15	Huayin	115,500
6	Weinan	551,600	16	Binzhou	114,100
7	Yan'an	416,700
8	Tongchuan	413,300
9	Ankang	350,700
10	Shangluo	262,500

=== Religion ===
Religion in Shaanxi (Note: The data was collected by the Chinese General Social Survey (CGSS) of 2009 and by the Chinese Spiritual Life Survey (CSLS) of 2007, reported and assembled by Xiuhua Wang (2015) in order to confront the proportion of people identifying with two similar social structures: ① Christian churches, and ② the traditional Chinese religion of the lineage (i. e. people believing and worshipping ancestral deities often organised into lineage "churches" and ancestral shrines). Data for other religions with a significant presence in China (deity cults, Buddhism, Taoism, folk religious sects, Islam, et al.) was not reported by Wang.)
1. Chinese ancestral religion (7.58%)
2. Christianity (1.57%)
3. Islam (0.80%)
4. Other religions or not religious people (Note: This may include: Buddhists; Confucians; Deity worshippers; Taoists; Members of folk religious sects; And people not bounded to, nor practicing any, institutional or diffuse religion.) (90.0%)

The predominant religions in Shaanxi are Chinese folk religions, Taoist traditions and Chinese Buddhism. According to surveys conducted in 2007 and 2009, 7.58% of the population believes and is involved in ancestor veneration, while 1.57% of the population identifies as Christian. The reports didn't give figures for other types of religion; 90.85% of the population may be either irreligious or involved in worship of nature deities, Buddhism, Confucianism, Taoism, folk religious sects, and small minorities of Muslims.

- Catholic Church in Shaanxi
- Catholic Church in Zhifang, destroyed in 2017
- Golden Lampstand Church, destroyed in 2018
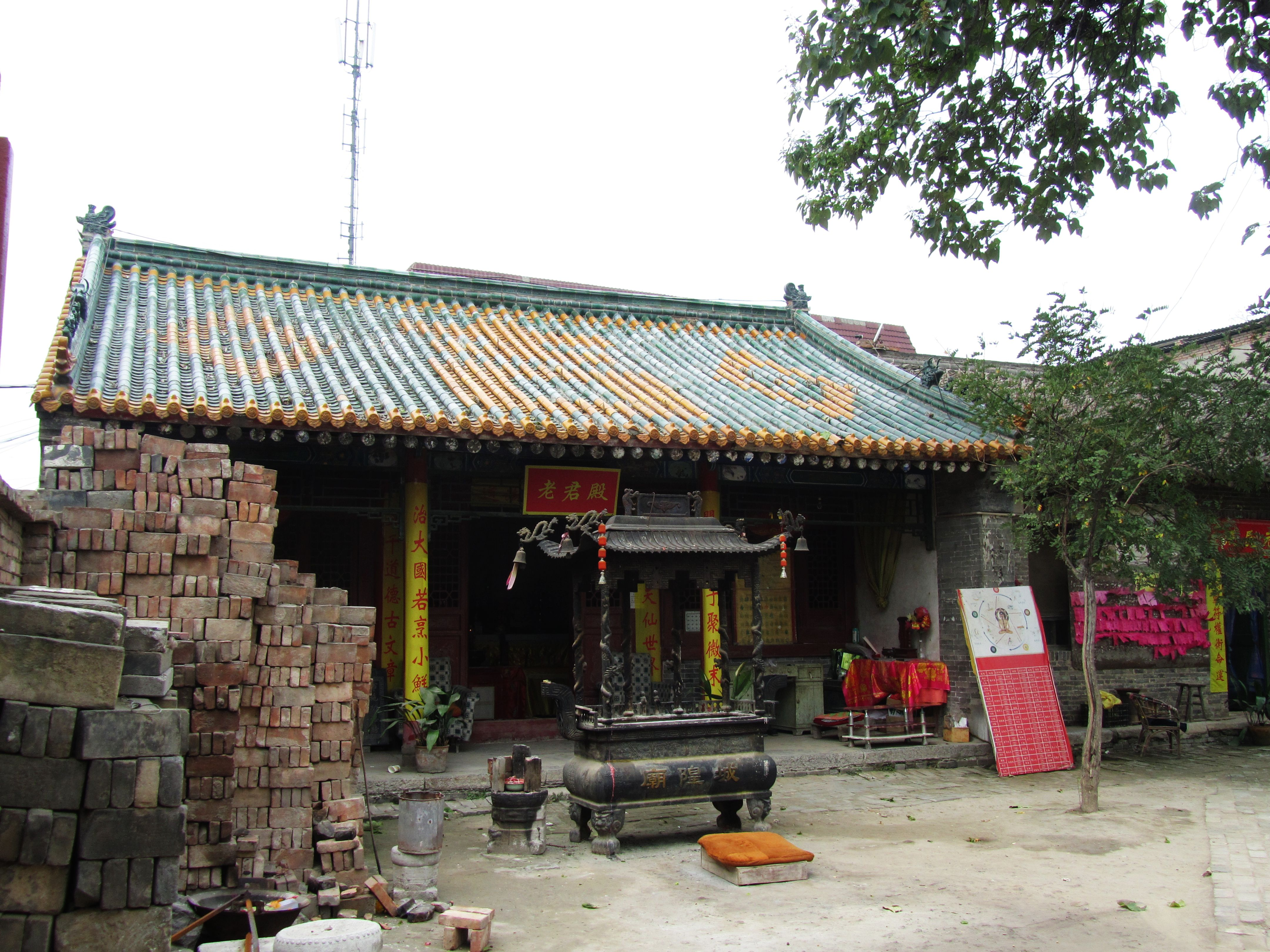
Temple of the Chenghuangshen (City God) of Weinan.

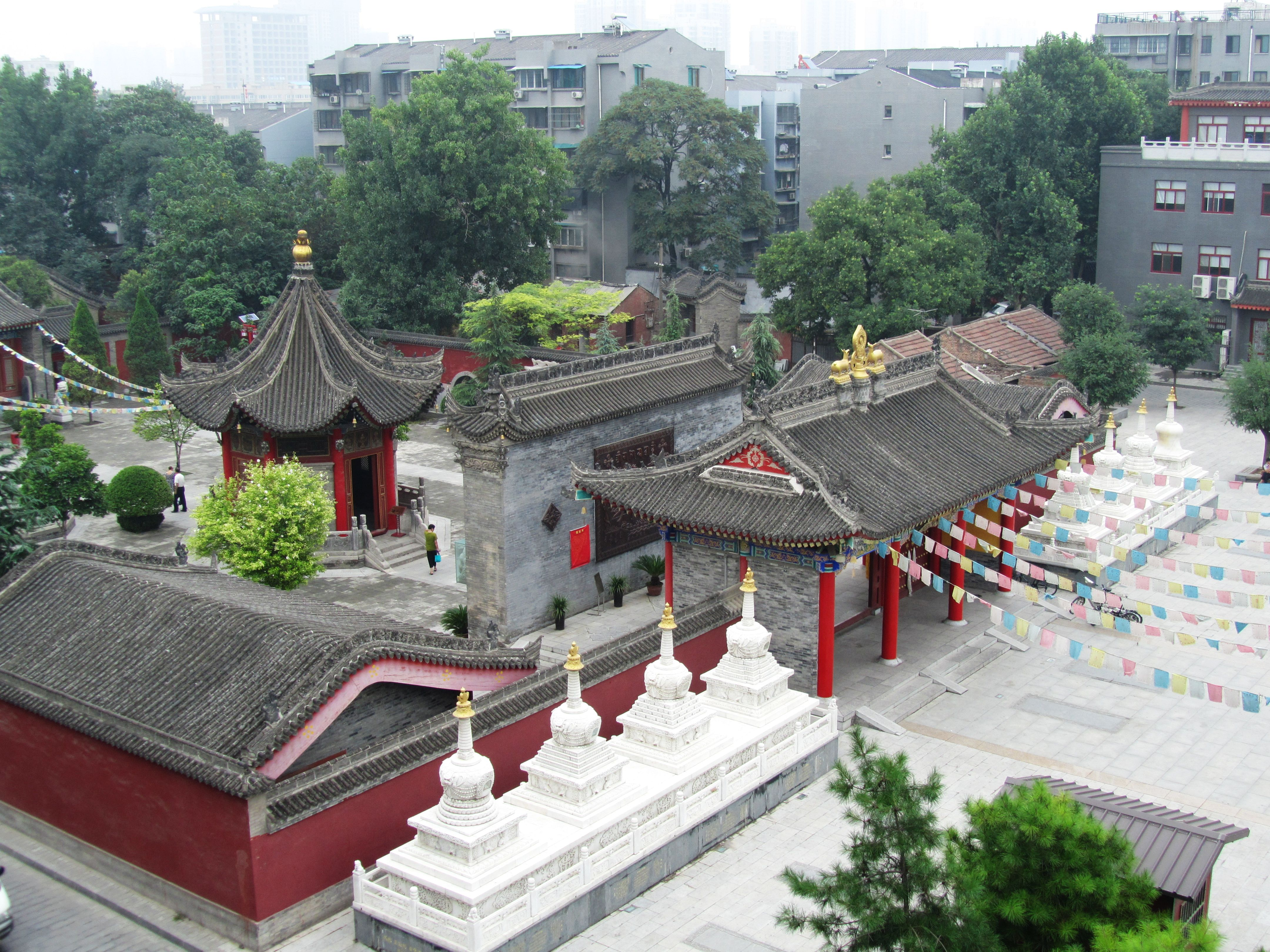
Guangren Temple of the Tibetan Buddhist tradition in Xi'an.

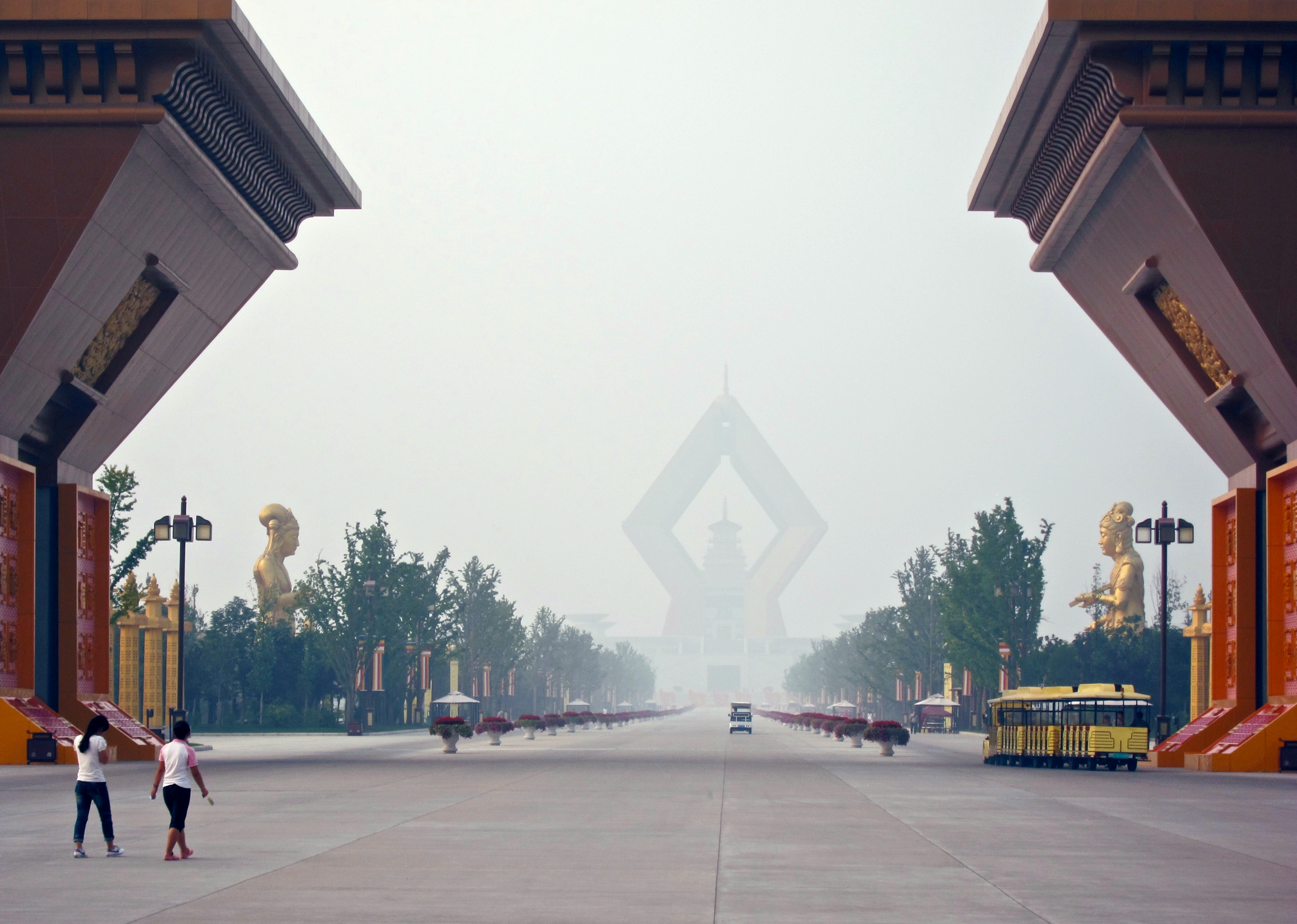
Road to the stupa of the Famen Temple (Chinese Buddhist).

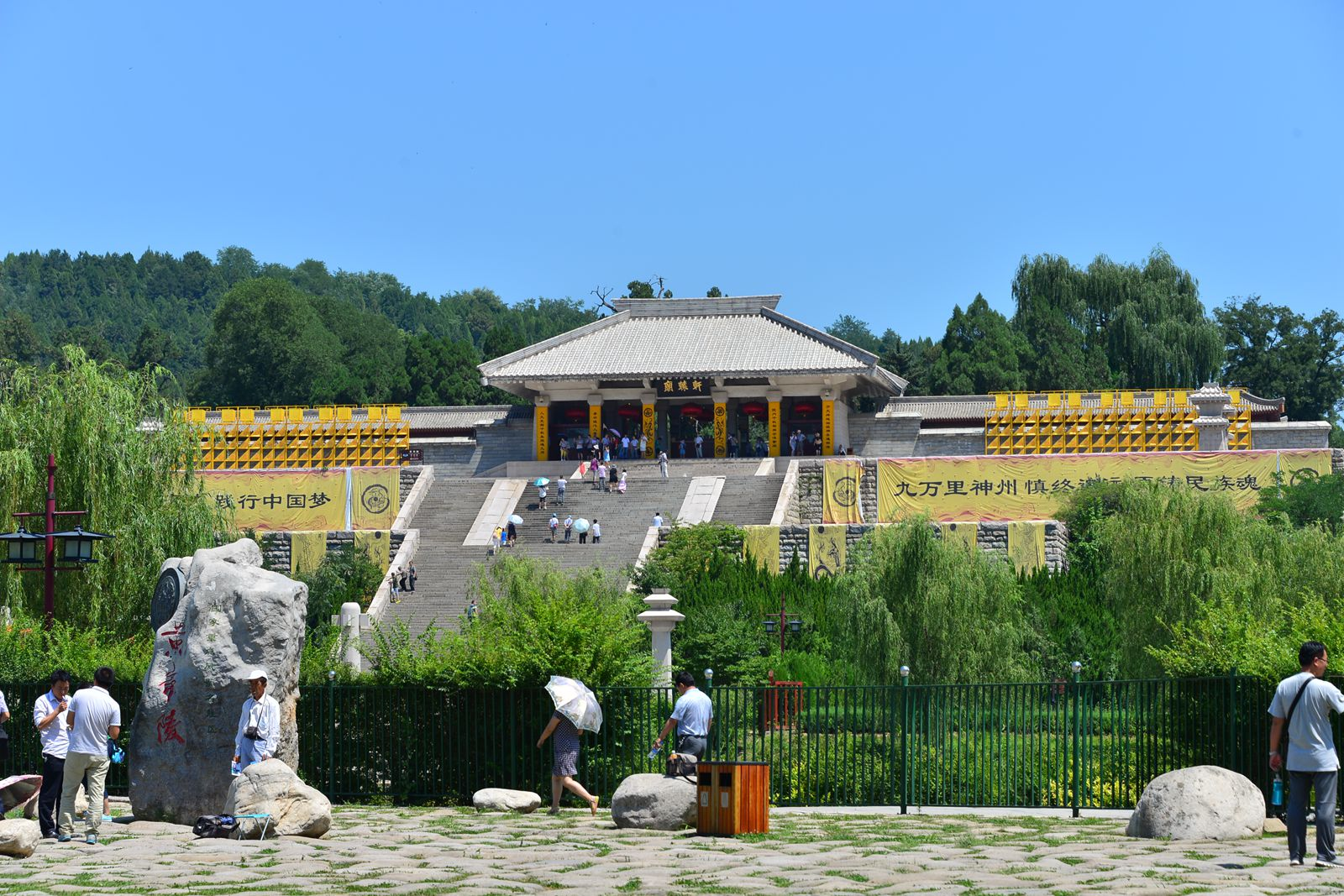
Temple of Xuanyuan in Huangling, Yan'an.

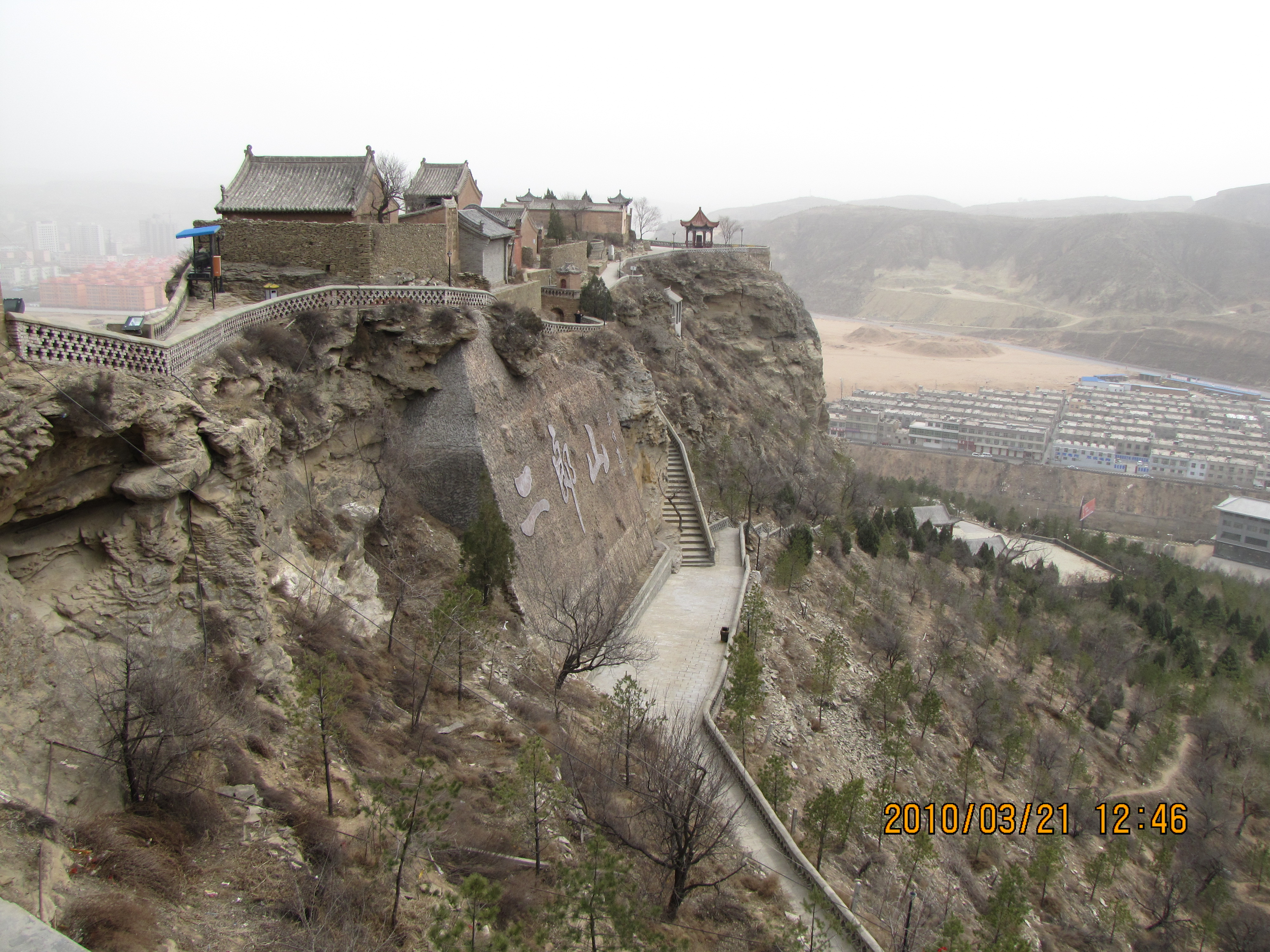
Temple at Erlangshan (二郎山) overlooking Shenmu

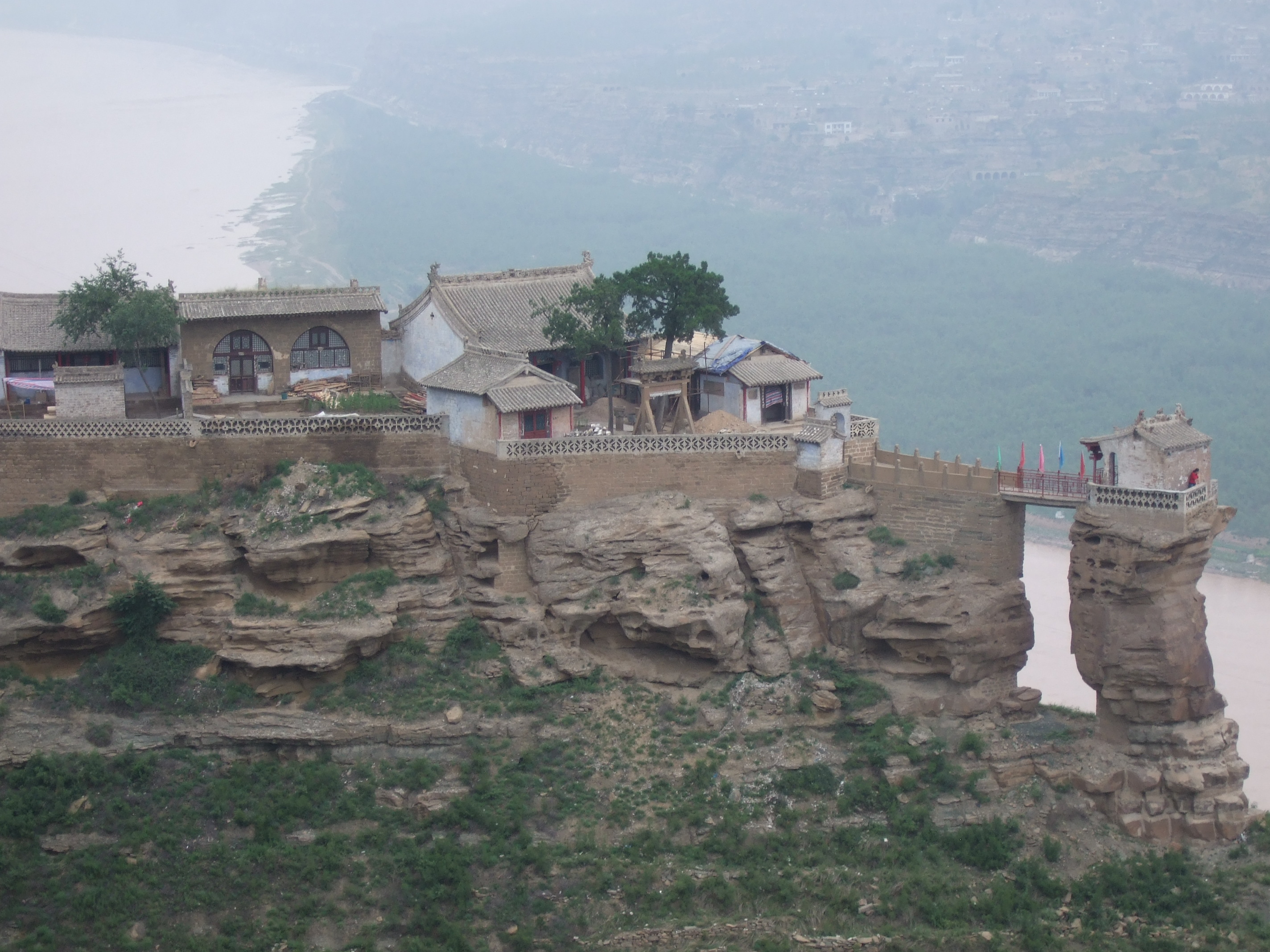
Daoist temple by the Yellow River

== Culture ==
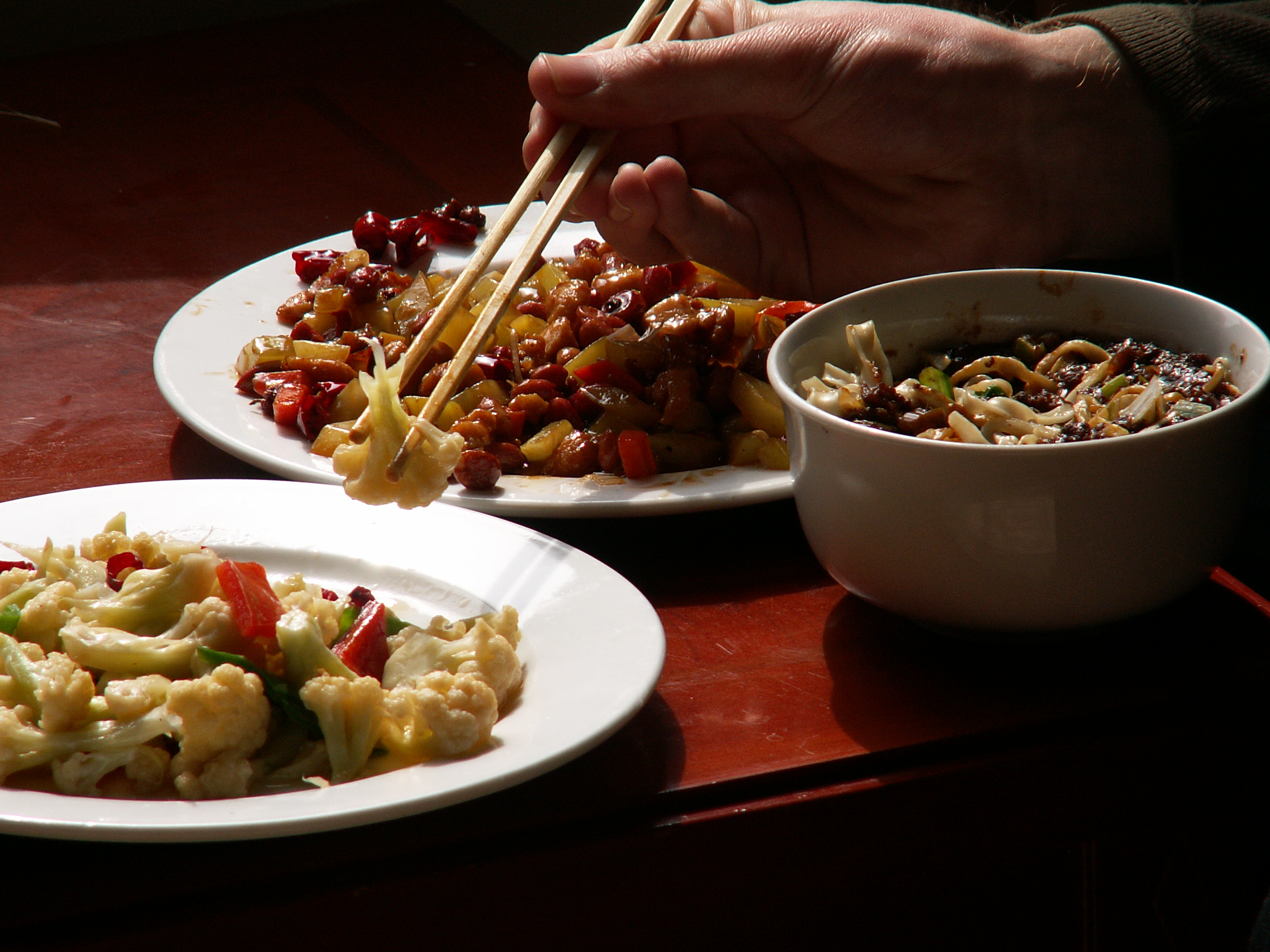
Shaanxi cuisine

- Shaanxi cuisine
- Qinqiang, the representative folk opera of Shaanxi
- Shaanxi shadow play
- Xintianyou
- Also see Xi'an#Culture and religion

== Media ==
- Shaanxi Radio serves Xi'an and the surrounding Shaanxi province area with music and news.
- The Story of Yue Fei, a 17th–18th century wuxia novel about the life of Song dynasty general Yue Fei, says his military arts teacher, Zhou Tong, was from Shaanxi.

== Sports ==
Professional sports teams based in Shaanxi include:

- Chinese Basketball Association
  - National Basketball League (NBL): Shaanxi Wolves
  - Women's Chinese Basketball Association (WCBA): Shaanxi Red Wolves

== See also ==
- List of prisons in Shaanxi
- Major national historical and cultural sites in Shaanxi
- 1556 Shaanxi earthquake
