= Qindu District =

Coordinates: 34°18′38″N 108°40′50″E

Qindu 秦都区
- District
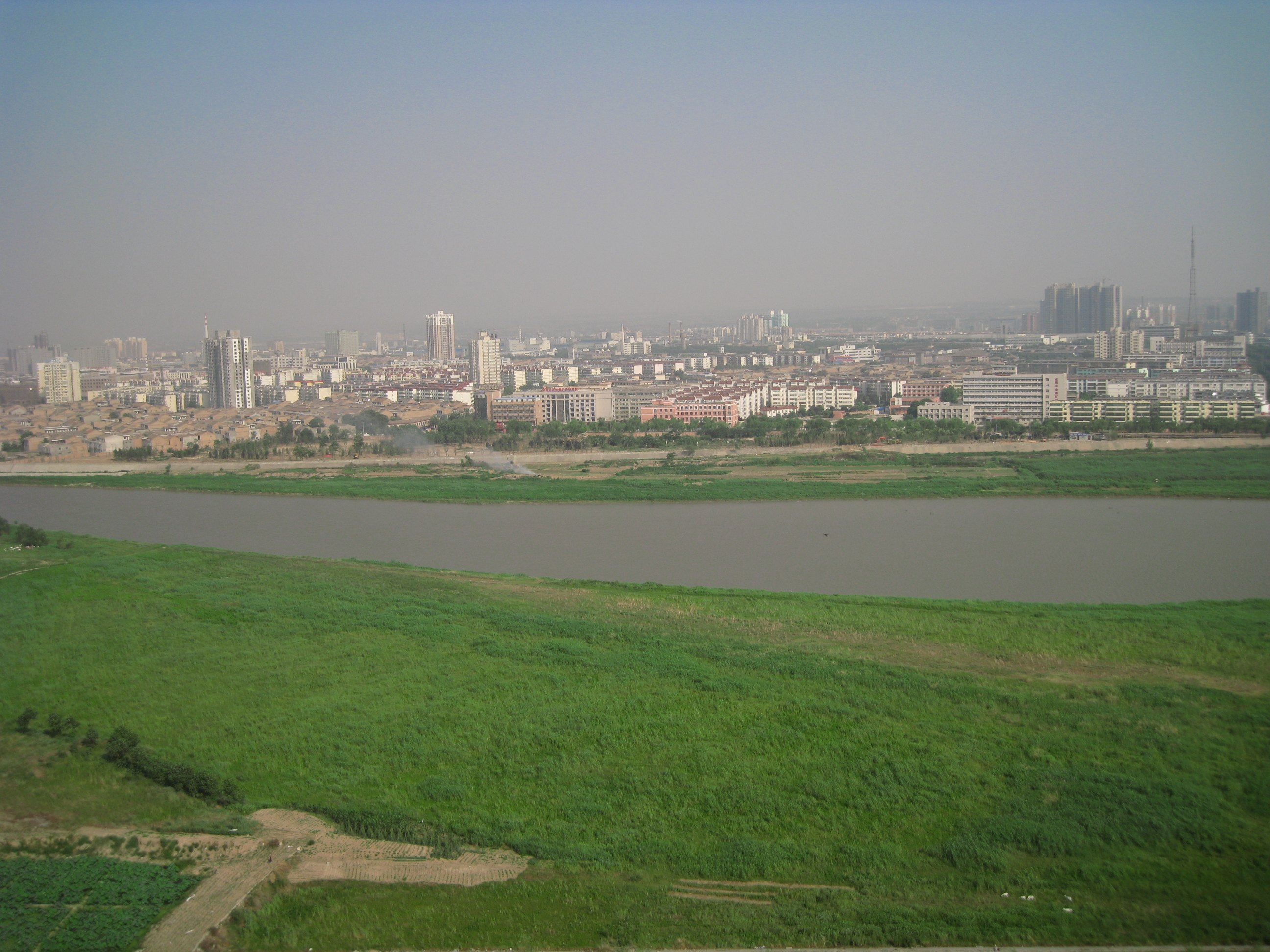

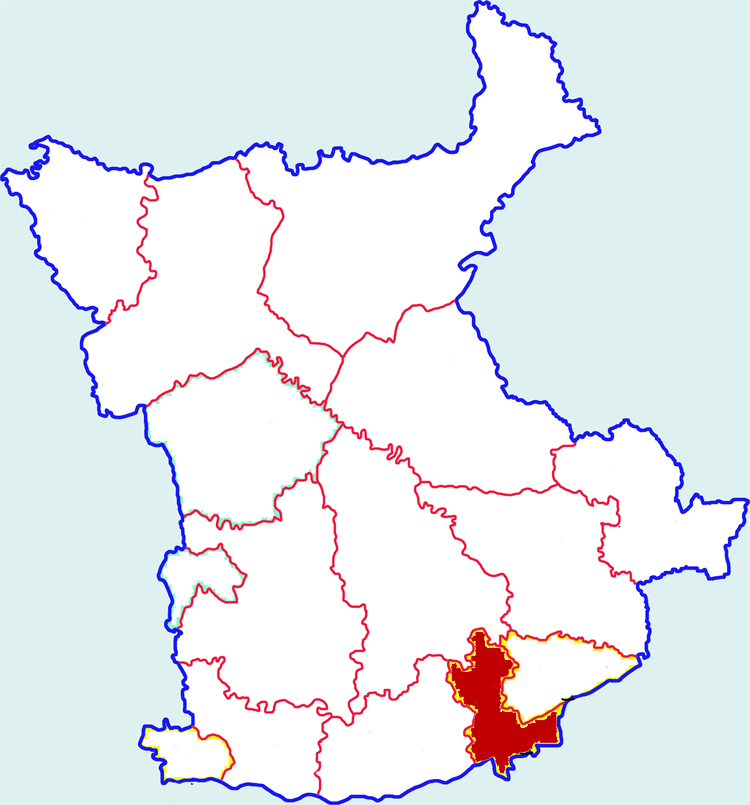
- Qindu in Xianyang

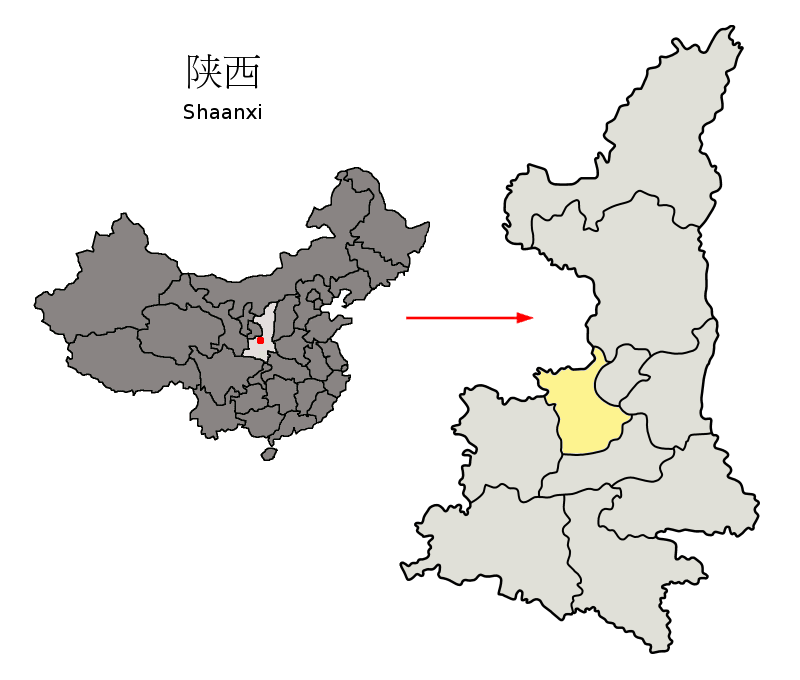
- Xianyang in Shaanxi
- Country: People's Republic of China
- Province: Shaanxi
- Prefecture-level city: Xianyang

Area
  - Total: 259 km^{2} (100 sq mi)

Population (2018)
  - Total: 351,000
  - Density: 1,360/km^{2} (3,510/sq mi)
- Time zone: UTC+8 (China standard time)
- Postal code: 712000
- Licence plates: 陕D
- Website: www.snqindu.gov.cn

Qindu District (simplified Chinese: 秦都区; traditional Chinese: 秦都區; pinyin: Qíndū Qū), is a district of the city of Xianyang, Shaanxi province, China.

== Administrative divisions ==
As of 2016, this district is divided into 5 subdistricts and 7 towns.

Subdistricts

- Dongcheng (Eastern City) Subdistrict (东城街道)
- Xicheng (Western City) Subdistrict (西城街道)
- Dianzhang Subdistrict (店张街道)
- Xiwu Subdistrict (西吴街道)
- Mawei Subdistrict (马嵬街道)
- Renmin Road Subdistrict (人民路街道)

Towns

- Zhaocun (赵村镇)
- Nanshi (南市镇)
- Zhuangtou (庄头镇)
- Nanwei (南位镇)
- Fuzhai (阜寨镇)
- Fengyi (丰仪镇)
- Tangfang (汤坊镇)

== Climate ==
Climate data for Qindu District, elevation 473 m (1,552 ft), (1991–2020 normals, extremes 1966–present)
Month	Jan	Feb	Mar	Apr	May	Jun	Jul	Aug	Sep	Oct	Nov	Dec	Year
Record high °C (°F)	16.0 (60.8)	23.0 (73.4)	30.6 (87.1)	34.6 (94.3)	37.8 (100.0)	42.0 (107.6)	42.0 (107.6)	40.3 (104.5)	36.8 (98.2)	31.1 (88.0)	24.4 (75.9)	22.4 (72.3)	42.0 (107.6)
Mean daily maximum °C (°F)	4.7 (40.5)	9.1 (48.4)	15.1 (59.2)	21.5 (70.7)	26.4 (79.5)	31.5 (88.7)	32.5 (90.5)	30.2 (86.4)	25.1 (77.2)	19.1 (66.4)	12.3 (54.1)	6.3 (43.3)	19.5 (67.1)
Daily mean °C (°F)	−0.8 (30.6)	3.1 (37.6)	8.8 (47.8)	14.8 (58.6)	19.7 (67.5)	25.0 (77.0)	26.9 (80.4)	25.0 (77.0)	19.9 (67.8)	13.5 (56.3)	6.4 (43.5)	0.6 (33.1)	13.6 (56.4)
Mean daily minimum °C (°F)	−5.1 (22.8)	−1.6 (29.1)	3.4 (38.1)	8.6 (47.5)	13.4 (56.1)	18.8 (65.8)	22.1 (71.8)	20.9 (69.6)	15.9 (60.6)	9.2 (48.6)	1.9 (35.4)	−3.7 (25.3)	8.7 (47.6)
Record low °C (°F)	−16.3 (2.7)	−12.4 (9.7)	−8.5 (16.7)	−2.1 (28.2)	2.4 (36.3)	8.7 (47.7)	14.7 (58.5)	12.0 (53.6)	5.0 (41.0)	−4.4 (24.1)	−12.3 (9.9)	−18.6 (−1.5)	−18.6 (−1.5)
Average precipitation mm (inches)	6.2 (0.24)	8.8 (0.35)	22.1 (0.87)	34.6 (1.36)	49.8 (1.96)	60.5 (2.38)	82.8 (3.26)	84.6 (3.33)	89.4 (3.52)	54.0 (2.13)	21.9 (0.86)	4.5 (0.18)	519.2 (20.44)
Average precipitation days (≥ 0.1 mm)	3.5	3.9	5.9	7.0	8.8	8.0	9.7	9.4	11.4	9.6	5.7	2.8	85.7
Average snowy days	4.3	3.1	1.3	0.1	0	0	0	0	0	0	1.2	2.6	12.6
Average relative humidity (%)	64	63	62	66	65	61	69	75	78	78	74	66	68
Mean monthly sunshine hours	134.4	132.0	169.8	194.4	211.3	211.0	223.2	200.8	143.1	138.0	135.5	141.0	2,034.5
Percentage possible sunshine	43	42	46	49	49	49	51	49	39	40	44	46	46
Source: China Meteorological Administration all-time extreme temperature August Record High
