= Golden Lampstand Church =

Christian church located in Shanxi Province, China

Golden Lampstand Church was a Christian church located in Shanxi Province, China. It was one of the country's largest Protestant evangelical churches until Chinese police officers demolished it on January 9, 2018, using heavy machinery and dynamite.

The church was built in 2009 at the cost of 17 million yuan.

A state newspaper quoted an unidentified official as saying that the church had been secretly constructed without proper permits. Several members of the congregation were imprisoned. The government had been planning to destroy the church since 2010.

On August 7, 2021, nine leaders and members of the Golden Lampstand Church were arrested in a public security operation.
