= Zhucun station (Xi'an Metro) =

Metro station in Xi'an, China

Zhucun 祝村

Chinese name
- Chinese: 祝村
Transcriptions
Standard Mandarin
- Hanyu Pinyin: Zhùcūn
- Wade–Giles: Chu^{4}-ts‘un^{1}
- IPA: [ʈʂû.tsʰwə́n]

General information
- Location: Chang'an District, Xi'an, Shaanxi; China
- Operator: Xi'an Metro Co. Ltd.
- Line: Line 15
- Platforms: 2 (1 island platform)
- Connections: Xi'an Skyshuttle Zhucun station

Construction
- Structure type: Underground

History
- Opened: 29 December 2025

Services
| Preceding station | Xi'an Metro | Following station |
|---|---|---|
| Zhucunxi towards Xiliu | Line 15 | Guoduxi towards Dongzhaoyu |
Location

Zhucun station (Chinese: 祝村站) is a station of Line 15 of the Xi'an Metro located in Xi'an's Chang'an District. It started operations on 29 December 2025.

The station is connected to Xi'an Skyshuttle's Zhucun station.

== Station layout ==
| G | Exits | Exits A–D |
| L1; Concourse | Lobby | Customer service, ticket machines, ticket gates, Chang'an Card machines |
| L2; Platforms | arrow for L | 15 towards Xiliu (Zhucunxi) |
| L2; Platforms | Island platform, doors open on the left |
| L2; Platforms | arrow for R | 15 towards Dongzhaoyu (Guoduxi) |

== Exits ==
| Designation | Nearby landmarks | Image |
|---|---|---|
| A | Fengdou Avenue (N), Xinghong First Road (W), Xi'an Special Aircraft Industry Park | |
| B | Fengdou Avenue (S), Xinghong First Road (W), Taihang Aerospace Silk Road Science Park | |
| C1 | Fengdou Avenue (S), Shanglinyuan First Road (E), Yuexiu China Railway–Zunyue | |
| D | Fengdou Avenue (N), Shanglinyuan First Road (E) | |
