= Huangzipo station =

Metro station in Xi'an, China

Huangzipo 皇子坡

Chinese name
- Chinese: 皇子坡
Transcriptions
Standard Mandarin
- Hanyu Pinyin: Huángzǐpō
- Wade–Giles: Huang^{2}-tzŭ^{3}-p‘o^{1}
- IPA: [xwǎŋ.tsɨ̀.pʰwó]

General information
- Location: Chang'an District, Xi'an, Shaanxi; China
- Operator: Xi'an Metro Co. Ltd.
- Line: Line 15
- Platforms: 2 (1 island platform)

Construction
- Structure type: Underground

History
- Opened: 29 December 2025

Services
Preceding station	Xi'an Metro	Following station
Hangtiancheng towards Xiliu	Line 15	Dongchang'anjie towards Dongzhaoyu
Location

Huangzipo station (Chinese: 皇子坡站) is a station of Line 15 of the Xi'an Metro located in Xi'an's Chang'an District. It started operations on 29 December 2025.

== Station layout ==
G	Exits	Exits A–D
L1; Concourse	Lobby	Customer service, ticket machines, ticket gates, Chang'an Card machines
L2; Platforms	arrow for L	15 towards Xiliu (Hangtiancheng)
L2; Platforms	Island platform, doors open on the left
L2; Platforms	arrow for R	15 towards Dongzhaoyu (Dongchang'anjie)

== Exits ==
Designation	Nearby landmarks	Image
A	East Chang'an Street (N), Shenzhou Second Road (W), Shaanxi Province Tobacco Company Xi'an Municipal Company Logistics Branch	
B	East Chang'an Street (S), Shenzhou Second Road (W), Longhu Yuhujing	
C	East Chang'an Street (S), Shenzhou Second Road (E), Galaxy Cloud Valley	
D	East Chang'an Street (N), Shenzhou Second Road (E), Cappuccino Guanlan	
