= Zhucunxi station =

Metro station in Xi'an, China

Zhucunxi 祝村西

Chinese name
- Chinese: 祝村西
- Literal meaning: Zhucun West
Transcriptions
Standard Mandarin
- Hanyu Pinyin: Zhùcūn xī
- Wade–Giles: Chu^{4}-ts‘un^{1} hsi^{1}
- IPA: [ʈʂû.tsʰwə́n ɕí]

General information
- Location: Chang'an District, Xi'an, Shaanxi; China
- Operator: Xi'an Metro Co. Ltd.
- Line: Line 15
- Platforms: 2 (1 island platform)

Construction
- Structure type: Underground

History
- Opened: 29 December 2025

Services
Preceding station	Xi'an Metro	Following station
Fujunmiao towards Xiliu	Line 15	Zhucun towards Dongzhaoyu
Location

Zhucunxi station (Chinese: 祝村西站) is a station of Line 15 of the Xi'an Metro located in Xi'an's Chang'an District. It started operations on 29 December 2025.

== Station layout ==
G	Exits	Exits A–D
L1; Concourse	Lobby	Customer service, ticket machines, ticket gates, Chang'an Card machines
L2; Platforms	arrow for L	15 towards Xiliu (Fujunmiao)
L2; Platforms	Island platform, doors open on the left
L2; Platforms	arrow for R	15 towards Dongzhaoyu (Zhucun)
L3; Reserved platforms	arrow for L	12 reserved platform
L3; Reserved platforms	Island platform, doors open on the left
L3; Reserved platforms	arrow for R	12 reserved platform

== Exits ==
Designation	Nearby landmarks	Image
A	Fengdou Avenue (N), Chuangzhi Road (W), Gaoke Shanglin Yayuan Apartments	
B	Fengdou Avenue (S), Chuangzhi Road (W)	
C	Weidou Avenue (S), Chuangzhi Road (E)	
D	Weidou Avenue (N), Chuangzhi Road (E)	
