= Fujunmiao station =

Metro station in Xi'an, China

Fujunmiao 府君庙

Chinese name
- Traditional Chinese: 府君廟
- Simplified Chinese: 府君庙
- Literal meaning: Fujun Temple
Transcriptions
Standard Mandarin
- Hanyu Pinyin: Fǔjūnmiào
- Wade–Giles: Fu^{3}-chün^{1}-miao^{4}
- IPA: [fù.tɕýn.mjâʊ]

General information
- Location: Chang'an District, Xi'an, Shaanxi; China
- Operator: Xi'an Metro Co. Ltd.
- Line: Line 15
- Platforms: 2 (1 island platform)

Construction
- Structure type: Underground

History
- Opened: 29 December 2025

Services
Preceding station	Xi'an Metro	Following station
Xiliu Terminus	Line 15	Zhucunxi towards Dongzhaoyu
Location

Fujunmiao station (Chinese: 府君庙站) is a station of Line 15 of the Xi'an Metro located in Xi'an's Chang'an District. It started operations on 29 December 2025.

== Station layout ==
G	Exits	Exits A–D
L1; Concourse	Lobby	Customer service, ticket machines, ticket gates, Chang'an Card machines
L2; Platforms	arrow for L	15 towards Xiliu (terminus)
L2; Platforms	Island platform, doors open on the left
L2; Platforms	arrow for R	15 towards Dongzhaoyu (Zhucunxi)

== Exits ==
Designation	Nearby landmarks	Image
A	Weidou Avenue (N), Chuangzhi Third Road (W), Xi'an Bright Laser Technologies Co., Ltd.	
B	Weidou Avenue (S), Chuangzhi Third Road (W), Xi'an Bright Laser Technologies Co., Ltd.	
C	Weidou Avenue (S), Chuangzhi Third Road (E)	
D	Weidou Avenue (N), Chuangzhi Third Road (E), Xi'an Hantang Senyuan Research and Development Base	
