= Hangtiancheng station =

Metro station in Xi'an, China

Hangtiancheng 航天城
- Line 2 Weiqunan-bound platform (February 2022, now Changninggong bound)

Chinese name
- Chinese: 航天城
Transcriptions
Standard Mandarin
- Hanyu Pinyin: Hángtiānchéng
- Wade–Giles: Hang^{2}-t‘ien^{1}-ch‘êng^{2}
- IPA: [xǎŋ.tʰjɛ́n.ʈʂʰə̌ŋ]

General information
- Location: Chang'an District, Xi'an, Shaanxi; China
- Operator: Xi'an Metro Co. Ltd.
- Lines: Line 2 Line 15
- Platforms: 4 (2 island platform)

Construction
- Structure type: Underground

History
- Opened: Line 2: 16 June 2014; Line 15: 29 December 2025

Services
Preceding station	Xi'an Metro	Following station
Fengqiyuan towards Caotan	Line 2	Weiqunan towards Changninggong
Chang'an Guangchang towards Xiliu	Line 15	Huangzipo towards Dongzhaoyu
Location

Hangtiancheng station (Chinese: 航天城站) is an interchange station of Line 2 and Line 15 of the Xi'an Metro located in Xi'an's Chang'an District. The Line 2 station started operations on 16 June 2014, and the Line 15 station started operations on 29 December 2025.

== Station layout ==
G	Exits	Exits A–C
L1; Concourse	Lobby	Customer service, ticket machines, ticket gates, Chang'an Card machines
L2; 2 platforms	arrow for L	2 towards Caotan (Fengqiyuan)
L2; 2 platforms	Island platform, doors open on the left
L2; 2 platforms	arrow for R	2 towards Changninggong (Weiqunan)
L3; 15 platforms	arrow for L	15 towards Xiliu (Chang'an Guangchang)
L3; 15 platforms	Island platform, doors open on the left
L3; 15 platforms	arrow for R	15 towards Dongzhaoyu (Huangzipo)

== Station artworks ==
Concourse art wall Weilai Mengxiang (未来梦想); it has since been taken down to make way for the Line 15 transfer passageway (February 2022)

Exit C art wall Lanse Changxiang (蓝色畅想; February 2022)

== Exits ==
Designation	Nearby landmarks	Image
A	North Chang'an Street (W), Wenhua Street, Huibin Hotel	
B	North Chang'an Street (W), Xinhua Street, West Chang'an Street, Chang'an International Hotel	
C	North Chang'an Street (E), Fengqu Old Street, East Chang'an Street	

== Gallery ==
Line 2 concourse (April 2023)

Construction site of the Line 15 station (April 2023)

Construction site of the Line 15 station (February 2022)
