= Guoduxi station =

Metro station in Xi'an, China

Guoduxi 郭杜西
- Line 6 Xi'annanzhan-bound platform

Chinese name
- Chinese: 郭杜西
- Literal meaning: Guodu West
Transcriptions
Standard Mandarin
- Hanyu Pinyin: Guōdù xī
- Wade–Giles: Kuo^{1}-tu^{4} hsi^{1}
- IPA: [kwó.tû ɕí]

General information
- Location: Chang'an District, Xi'an, Shaanxi; China
- Operator: Xi'an Metro Co. Ltd.
- Lines: Line 6 Line 15
- Platforms: 4 (2 island platforms)

Construction
- Structure type: Underground

History
- Opened: Line 6: 28 December 2020; Line 15: 29 December 2025
- Former names: Fengdoulu (韦斗路)

Services
Preceding station	Xi'an Metro	Following station
Rencun towards Xi'annanzhan	Line 6	Xibudadao (Xitailukou) towards Fangzhicheng
Zhucun towards Xiliu	Line 15	Guodu towards Dongzhaoyu
Location

Guoduxi station (Chinese: 郭杜西站) is an interchange station of Line 6 and Line 15 of the Xi'an Metro located in Xi'an's Chang'an District. The Line 6 station started operations on 28 December 2020, and the Line 15 station started operations on 29 December 2025.

== Station layout ==
G	Exits	Exits A, B, D
L1; Concourse	Lobby	Customer service, ticket machines, ticket gates, Chang'an Card machines
L2; 6 platforms	arrow for L	6 towards Xi'annanzhan (Rencun)
L2; 6 platforms	Island platform, doors open on the left
L2; 6 platforms	arrow for R	6 towards Fangzhicheng (Xibudadao (Xitailukou))
L3; 15 platforms	arrow for L	15 towards Xiliu (Zhucun)
L3; 15 platforms	Island platform, doors open on the left
L3; 15 platforms	arrow for R	15 towards Dongzhaoyu (Guodu)

== Exits ==
Designation	Nearby landmarks	Image
A	Xitai Road (W), Fengdou Road (N)	
B	Xitai Road (W), Fengdou Road (S)	
D	Xitai Road (E), Chuanghui Road, Guodu West Street, Fengdou Road (E)	
