= Dongchang'anjie station =

Metro station in Xi'an, China

Dongchang'anjie 东长安街
- Line 4 Hangtianxincheng-bound platform

Chinese name
- Traditional Chinese: 東長安街
- Simplified Chinese: 东长安街
- Literal meaning: East Chang'an Street
Transcriptions
Standard Mandarin
- Hanyu Pinyin: Dōng Cháng'ān jiē
- Wade–Giles: Tung^{1} Ch‘ang^{2}-an^{1} chieh^{1}
- IPA: [tʊ́ŋ ʈʂʰǎŋ.án tɕjé]

General information
- Location: Chang'an District, Xi'an, Shaanxi; China
- Operator: Xi'an Metro Co. Ltd.
- Lines: Line 4 Line 15
- Platforms: 4 (2 island platform)

Construction
- Structure type: Underground

History
- Opened: Line 4: 26 December 2018; Line 15: 29 December 2025

Services
Preceding station	Xi'an Metro	Following station
Feitianlu towards Xi'an Beizhan	Line 4	Shenzhoudadao towards Hangtianxincheng
Huangzipo towards Xiliu	Line 15	Dongzhaoyu Terminus
Location

Dongchang'anjie station (Chinese: 东长安街站) is an interchange station of Line 4 and Line 15 of the Xi'an Metro located in Xi'an's Chang'an District. The Line 4 station started operations on 26 December 2018, and the Line 15 station started operations on 29 December 2025.

== Station layout ==
G	Exits	Exits A–E
L1; Concourse	Lobby	Customer service, ticket machines, ticket gates, Chang'an Card machines
L2; 4 platforms	arrow for L	4 towards Xi'an Beizhan (Feitianlu)
L2; 4 platforms	Island platform, doors open on the left
L2; 4 platforms	arrow for R	4 towards Hangtianxincheng (Shenzhoudadao)
L3; 15 platforms	arrow for L	15 towards Xiliu (Huangzipo)
L3; 15 platforms	Island platform, doors open on the left
L3; 15 platforms	arrow for R	15 towards Dongzhaoyu (terminus)

== Exits ==
Designation	Nearby landmarks	Image
A	Shenzhou Fourth Road (W), East Chang'an Street (N), Shenzhou Third Road, Gongye Second Road	
B	Shenzhou Fourth Road (W), Hangchuang Road, Qihang Road, Hangtiancheng Zhonghu Park	
C	East Chang'an Street (S), Shenzhou Fourth Road (E), Shenzhou Fifth Road	
D	East Chang'an Street (N), Shenzhou Fourth Road (E), Shenzhou Fifth Road, Gongye Second Road, Shenzhou Avenue	
E	Shenzhou Fourth Road (E), Xinghe Road, Xingchen Road, Hangchuang Road (N)	
