= Line 15 (Xi'an Metro) =

Metro line in Xi'an, China

- 15

Overview
- Status: In operation
- Owner: Xi'an
- Locale: Xi'an
- Termini: Xiliu; Dongzhaoyu
- Stations: 13

Service
- Type: Rapid transit
- System: Xi'an Metro
- Services: 1
- Operator: Xi'an Metro Corporation

History
- Opened: 29 December 2025

Technical
- Line length: 19.459 km (12.091 mi)
- Number of tracks: 2
- Character: Underground
- Track gauge: 1,435 mm (4 ft 8 1/2 in)

Line 15 of the Xi'an Metro (Chinese: 西安地铁15号线; pinyin: Xī'ān Dìtiě Shíwǔ Hàoxiàn) is a rapid transit line in operation in Xi'an, Shaanxi Province, China, running from west to east. Phase 1 of Line 15 is 19.46 km (12.09 mi) long with 13 stations. It opened on 29 December 2025.

== Stations (west to east) ==
All stations are located in Chang'an District.

Station name		Connections
English	Chinese	Connections
Xiliu	细柳	
Fujunmiao	府君庙	
Zhucunxi	祝村西	
Zhucun	祝村	Xi'an SkyShuttle
Guoduxi	郭杜西	6
Guodu	郭杜	
Yinghua Guangchang	樱花广场	
Youdian Daxue	邮电大学	
Chang'an Guangchang	长安广场	
Hangtiancheng	航天城	2
Huangzipo	皇子坡	
Dongchang'anjie	东长安街	4
Dongzhaoyu	东兆余	

== Future expansions ==
Phase 2 of Line 15 does not meet the requirements and is not approved for construction because within 800 meters on each side of the planned large-capacity rail line, the total current population and job density must not be less than 14,000 people per square kilometer.
