= Dongzhaoyu station =

Metro station in Xi'an, China

Dongzhaoyu 东兆余

Chinese name
- Traditional Chinese: 東兆餘
- Simplified Chinese: 东兆余
- Literal meaning: East Zhaoyu
Transcriptions
Standard Mandarin
- Hanyu Pinyin: Dōngzhàoyú
- Wade–Giles: Tung^{1}-chao^{4}-yü^{2}
- IPA: [tʊ́ŋ.ʈʂâʊ.y̌]

General information
- Location: Chang'an District, Xi'an, Shaanxi; China
- Operator: Xi'an Metro Co. Ltd.
- Line: Line 15
- Platforms: 2 (1 island platform)

Construction
- Structure type: Underground

History
- Opened: 29 December 2025

Services
Preceding station	Xi'an Metro	Following station
Dongchang'anjie towards Xiliu	Line 15	Terminus
Location

Dongzhaoyu station (Chinese: 东兆余站) is a station of Line 15 of the Xi'an Metro located in Xi'an's Chang'an District. It started operations on 29 December 2025.

== Station layout ==
G	Exits	Exits A–D
L1; Concourse	Lobby	Customer service, ticket machines, ticket gates, Chang'an Card machines
L2; Platforms	arrow for L	15 towards Xiliu (Dongchang'anjie)
L2; Platforms	Island platform, doors open on the left
L2; Platforms	arrow for R	15 termination platform

== Exits ==
Designation	Nearby landmarks	Image
A	East Chang'an Street (E), Hangtian East Road (W), Xi'an Aerospace Precision Electromechanical Research Institute	
B	East Chang'an Street (S), Hangtian East Road (W), Taihang Aerospace Silk Road Science Park	
C	East Chang'an Street (S), Hangtian East Road (E), JI Hotel (Xi'an National Supercomputing Center East Chang'an Street)	
D	East Chang'an Street (N), Hangtian East Road (E)	
