= Terracotta Army =

Collection of ancient Chinese military statues

Mausoleum of the First Qin Emperor
UNESCO World Heritage Site

- Location within China
- Location: Lintong District, Xi'an, Shaanxi, China
- Criteria: Cultural: i, iii, iv, vi
- Reference: 441
- Inscription: 1987 (11th Session)
- Website: bmy.com.cn
- Coordinates: 34°23′06″N 109°16′23″E

Terracotta Army
- Simplified Chinese: 兵马俑
- Traditional Chinese: 兵馬俑
- Literal meaning: Soldier and horse tomb-figurines
Transcriptions
Standard Mandarin
- Hanyu Pinyin: Bīngmǎ yǒng
- Wade–Giles: Ping^{1}-ma^{3} yung^{3}
- IPA: [píŋmà jʊ̀ŋ]
Yue: Cantonese
- Yale Romanization: Bīng-máah yúng
- Jyutping: Bing^{1}-maa^{5} jung^{2}
Southern Min
- Tâi-lô: Ping-bé ióng

The Terracotta Army is a collection of terracotta sculptures depicting the armies of Qin Shi Huang, the first emperor of China. It is a form of funerary art buried with the emperor in 210–209 BCE in his mausoleum with the purpose of protecting him in his afterlife.

The figures, dating from approximately the late 200s BCE, were discovered in 1974 by local farmers in Lintong County, outside Xi'an, Shaanxi, China. The figures vary in height according to their rank, the tallest being the generals. The figures include warriors, chariots and horses. Estimates from 2007 were that the three pits containing the Terracotta Army hold more than 8,000 soldiers, 130 chariots with 520 horses, and 150 cavalry horses, the majority of which remain in situ. Other, non-military terracotta figures have since been found in other pits, including those of officials, acrobats, strongmen, and musicians.

== History ==
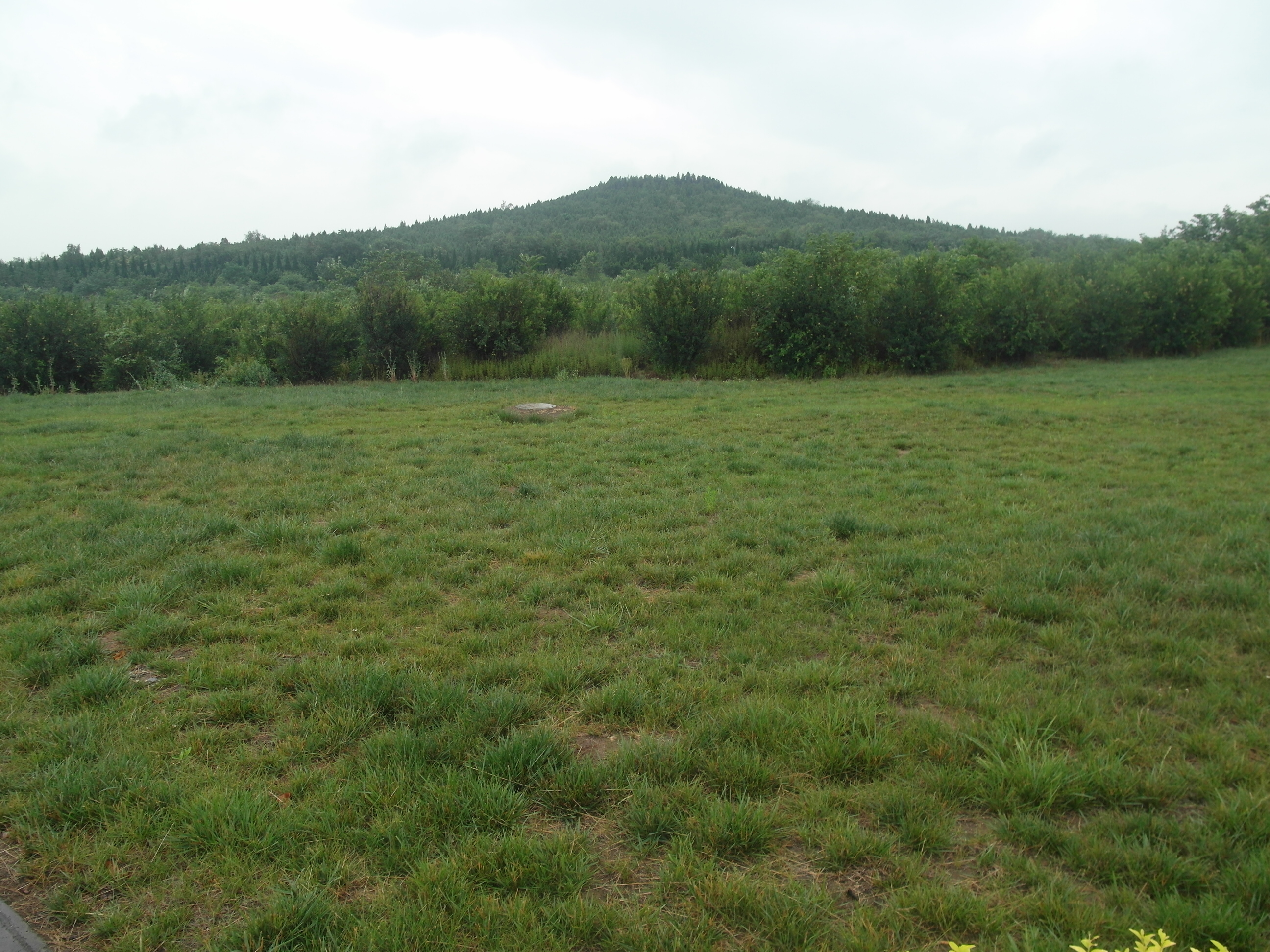
The mound where the tomb is located

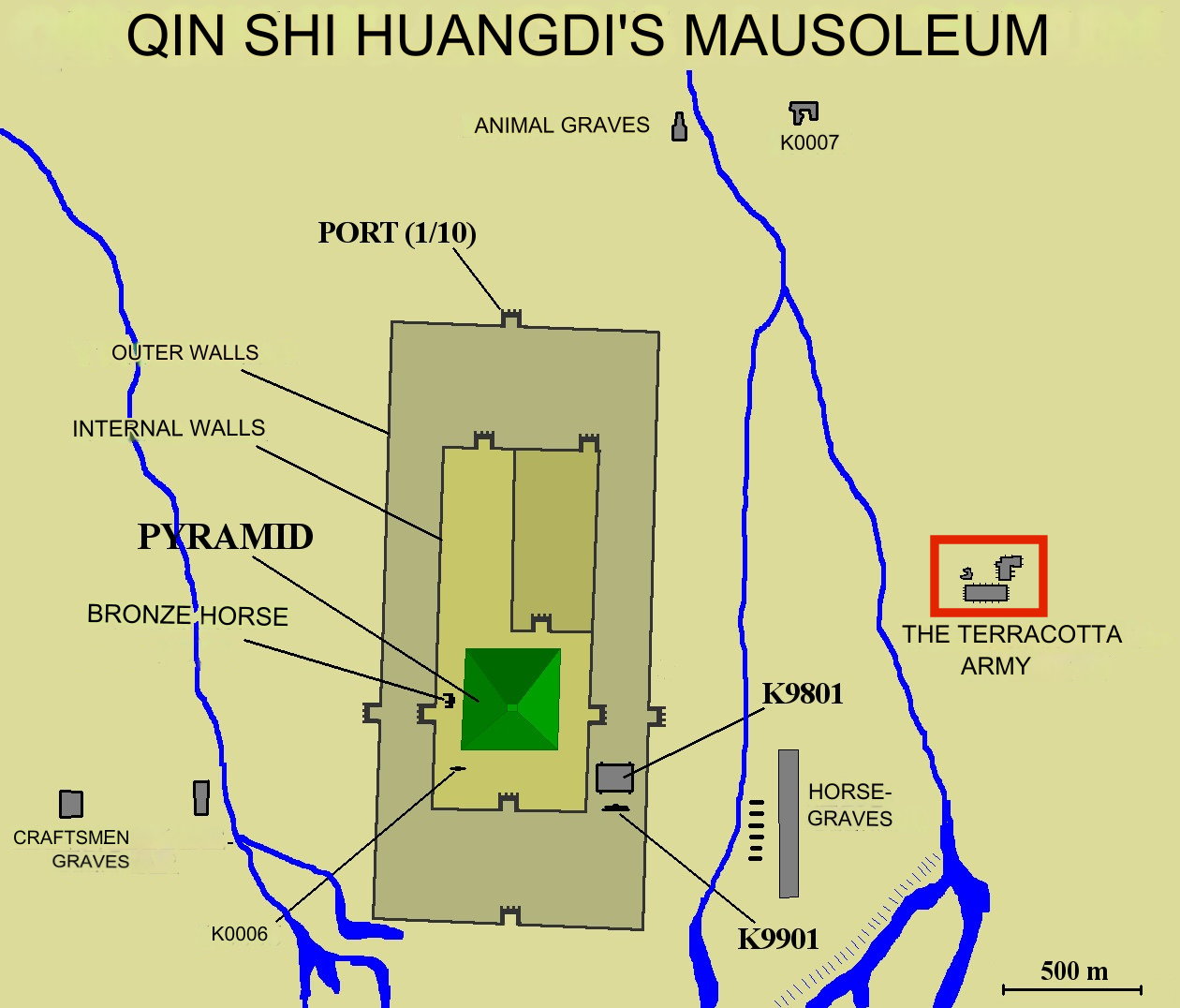
Plan of the Qin Shi Huang Mausoleum and location of the Terracotta Army. The central tomb itself has yet to be excavated.

The construction of the tomb was described by the historian Sima Qian (145–90 BCE) in the Records of the Grand Historian, the first of China's 24 dynastic histories, which was written a century after the mausoleum's completion. Work on the mausoleum began in 246 BCE, soon after Emperor Qin (then aged 13) succeeded his father as King of Qin, and Sima said that the project eventually involved 700,000 conscripted workers. Geographer Li Daoyuan, writing six centuries after the first emperor's death, recorded in Shui Jing Zhu that Mount Li was a favoured location due to its auspicious geology: "famed for its jade mines, its northern side was rich in gold, and its southern side rich in beautiful jade; the first emperor, covetous of its fine reputation, therefore chose to be buried there".

Sima Qian wrote that the first emperor was buried with palaces, towers, officials, valuable artifacts and wondrous objects. According to this famous account, 100 flowing rivers were simulated using mercury, and above them the ceiling was decorated with heavenly bodies, below which lay the features of the lands of China which the emperor had unified. Some translations of this passage refer to "models" or "imitations"; however, those words were not used in the original text, which also makes no mention of the terracotta army. Although these elements of Sima Qian's account on the structure of the mausoleum have been seen as credulous in pre-modern assessments, the detection of high levels of mercury that were found in the soil of the tomb mound following the discovery of the mausoleum site have since given credence to Sima Qian's account. Additionally, the Emperor is well documented for building monumental statues in human form during his reign, such as the Twelve Metal Colossi, which were a series of contemporaneous statues that are now lost but have been noted in historical records.

Later historical accounts have suggested that the mausoleum complex and tomb itself had been looted by Xiang Yu, a contender for the throne after the death of the first emperor. However, there are indications that the tomb itself may not have been plundered.

=== Discovery ===
The Terracotta Army was discovered on 29 March 1974 by a group of farmers—Yang Zhifa, his five brothers, and neighbour Wang Puzhi—who were digging a well approximately 1.5 km (0.93 mi) east of the Qin Emperor's tomb mound at Mount Li (Lishan), (Note: coordinates: 34°23′5.71″N 109°16′23.19″E).) a region riddled with underground springs and watercourses. For centuries, occasional reports surfaced of pieces of terracotta figures and fragments of the Qin necropolis – roofing tiles, bricks and chunks of masonry. This discovery prompted Chinese archaeologists, including Zhao Kangmin, to investigate, revealing the largest pottery figurine group ever found. A museum complex has since been constructed over the area, the largest pit being enclosed by a roofed structure.

== Necropolis ==
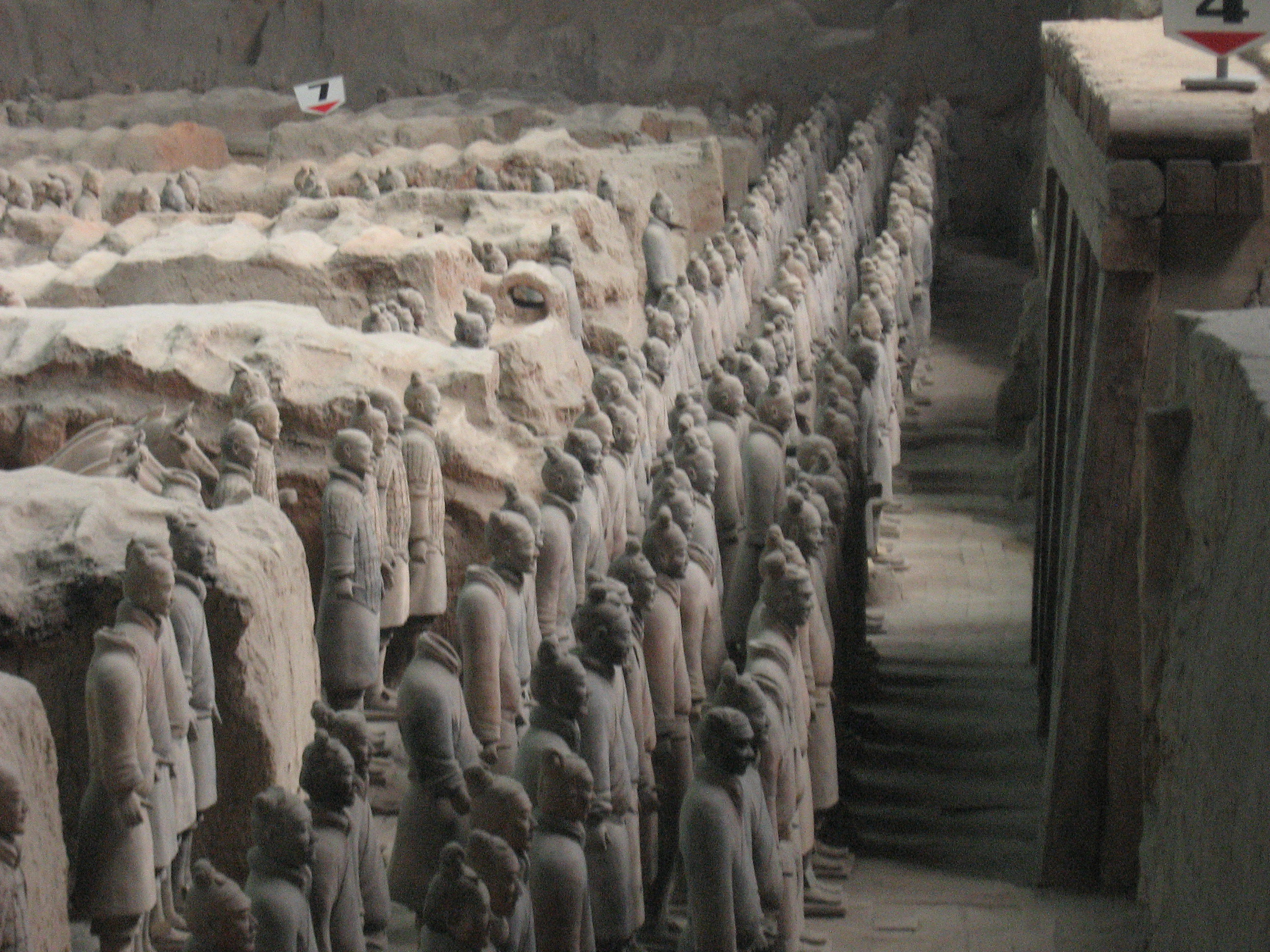
View of the Terracotta Army

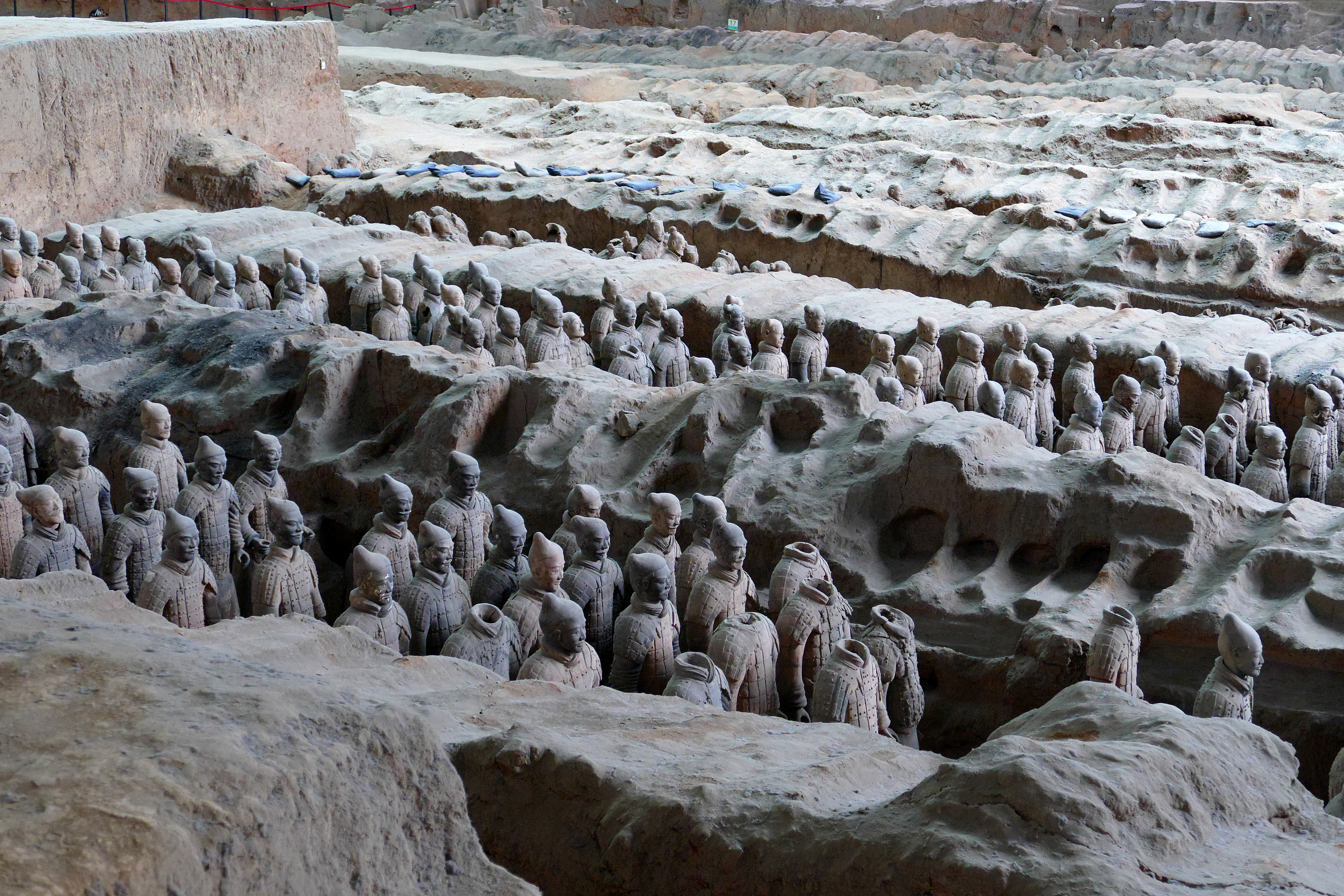
Mausoleum of the First Qin Emperor, Hall 1

The Terracotta Army is part of a much larger necropolis. Ground-penetrating radar and core sampling have measured the area to be approximately 98 square kilometres (38 sq mi).

The necropolis was constructed as a microcosm of the emperor's imperial palace or compound, and covers a large area around the tomb mound of the first emperor. The earthen tomb mound is located at the foot of Mount Li and has a pyramidal shape. It is surrounded by two solidly built rammed earth walls with gateway entrances. The necropolis consists of several offices, halls, stables and other structures as well as an imperial park placed around the tomb mound.

The warriors stand guard to the east of the tomb. Up to 5 metres (16 ft) of reddish, sandy soil had accumulated over the site in the two millennia following its construction, but archaeologists found evidence of earlier disturbances at the site. During the excavations near the Mount Li burial mound, archaeologists found several graves dating from the 18th and 19th centuries, where diggers had apparently struck terracotta fragments. These were discarded as worthless and used along with soil to backfill the excavations.

=== Tomb ===
The tomb appears to be a hermetically sealed space approximately 100 by 75 metres (328 ft × 246 ft). The tomb remains unopened, possibly due to concerns over preservation of its artifacts. For example, after the excavation of the Terracotta Army, the painted surface present on some terracotta figures began to flake and fade. The paint's lacquer covering can curl in fifteen seconds once exposed to Xi'an's dry air and can flake off in just four minutes.

== Excavation site ==
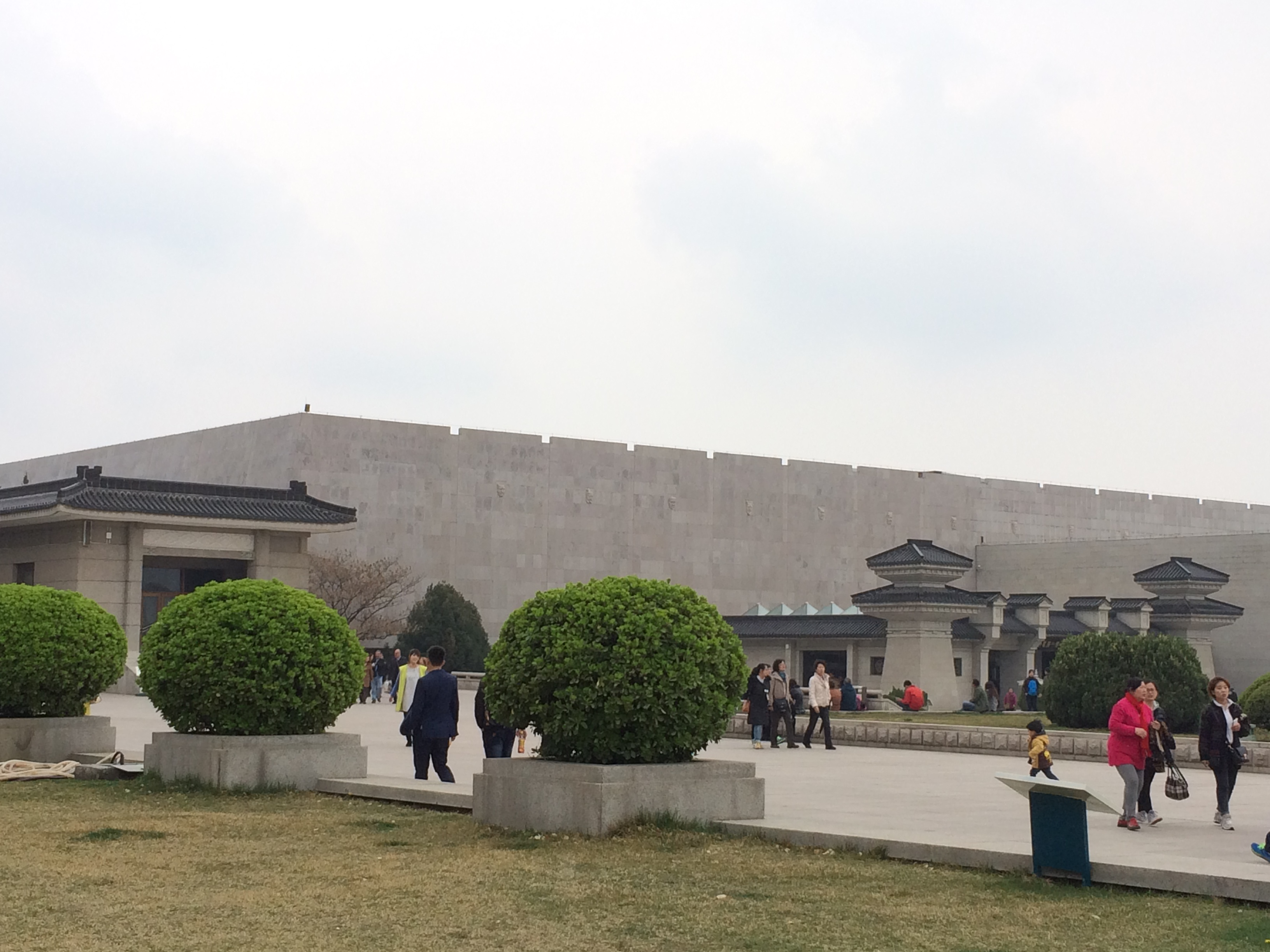
The museum complex containing the excavation sites

=== Pits ===
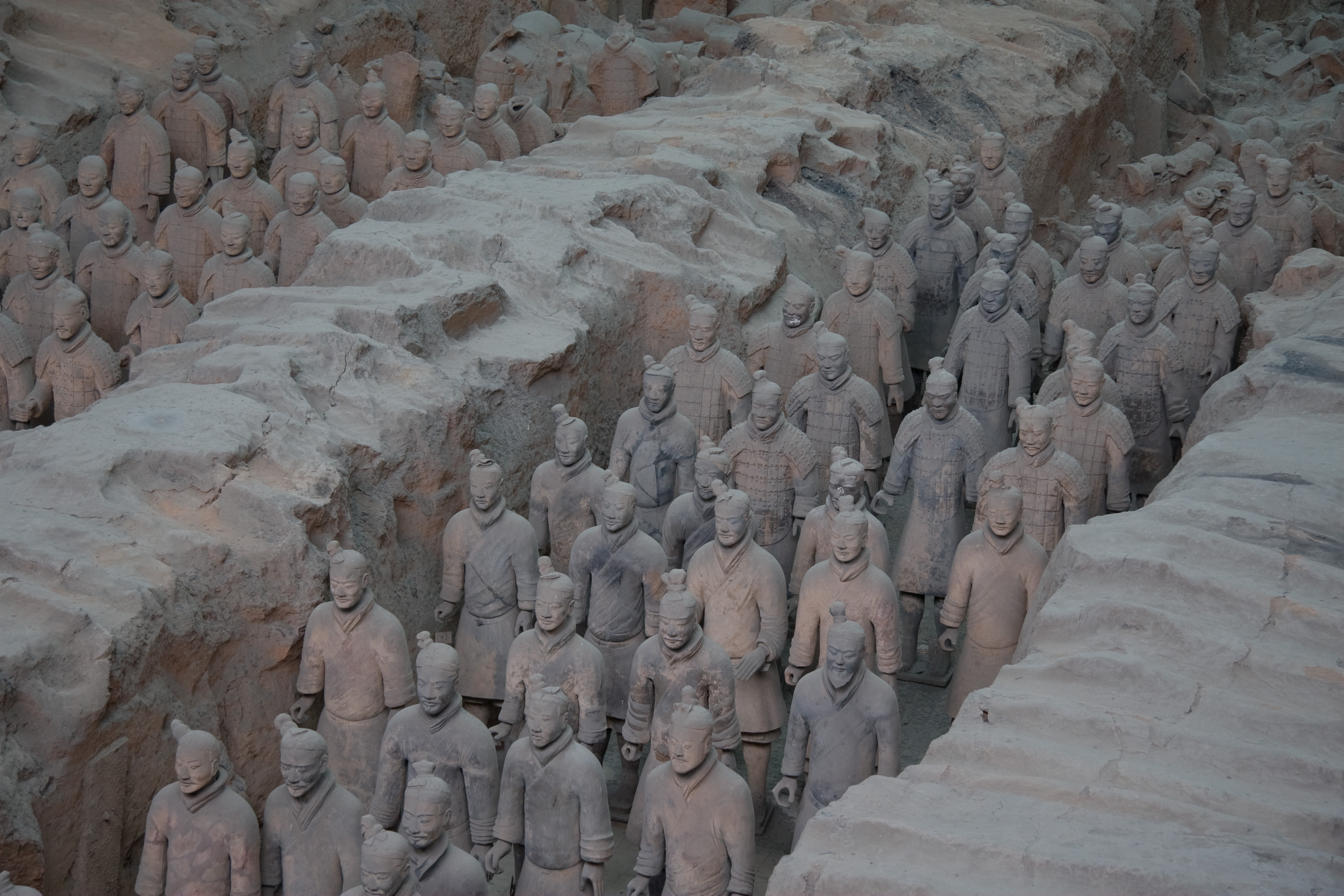
View of Pit 1, the largest excavation pit of the Terracotta Army

Four main pits approximately 7 m (23 ft) deep have since been uncovered in the site excavations. These are located approximately 1,500 m (4,900 ft) east of the burial mound. The soldiers within were laid out as if to protect the tomb from the east, where the Qin Emperor's conquered states lay, and were discovered 7 m below the excavation level.

==== Pit 1 ====
Pit 1, which is 230 m (750 ft) long and 62 m (203 ft) wide, contains the main army of more than 3,000 figures. It is the largest of the four pits and has eleven parallel corridors, most more than 3 m (10 ft) wide and paved with small bricks with a wooden ceiling supported by large beams and posts. This design was also used for the tombs of nobles and would have resembled palace hallways when built. The wooden ceilings were covered with reed mats and layers of clay for waterproofing, and then mounded with more soil raising them about 2 to 3 m (6 ft 7 in to 9 ft 10 in) above the surrounding ground level when completed.

==== Others ====
Pit 2 has cavalry and infantry units as well as war chariots and is thought to represent a military guard. Pit 3 is the command post, with high-ranking officers and a war chariot. Pit 4 is empty, perhaps left unfinished by its builders.

Some of the figures in Pits 1 and 2 show fire damage, while the remains of burnt ceiling rafters have also been found. These, together with the missing weapons, have been taken as evidence of the reported looting by Xiang Yu and the subsequent burning of the site, which is thought to have caused the roof to collapse and crush the army figures below. The terracotta figures currently on display have been restored from the fragments.

Other pits that formed the necropolis have also been excavated. These pits lie within and outside the walls surrounding the tomb mound. They variously contain bronze carriages, terracotta figures of entertainers such as acrobats and strongmen, officials, stone armour suits, burial sites of horses, rare animals and labourers, as well as bronze cranes and ducks set in an underground park.

== Warrior figures ==
=== Types and appearance ===
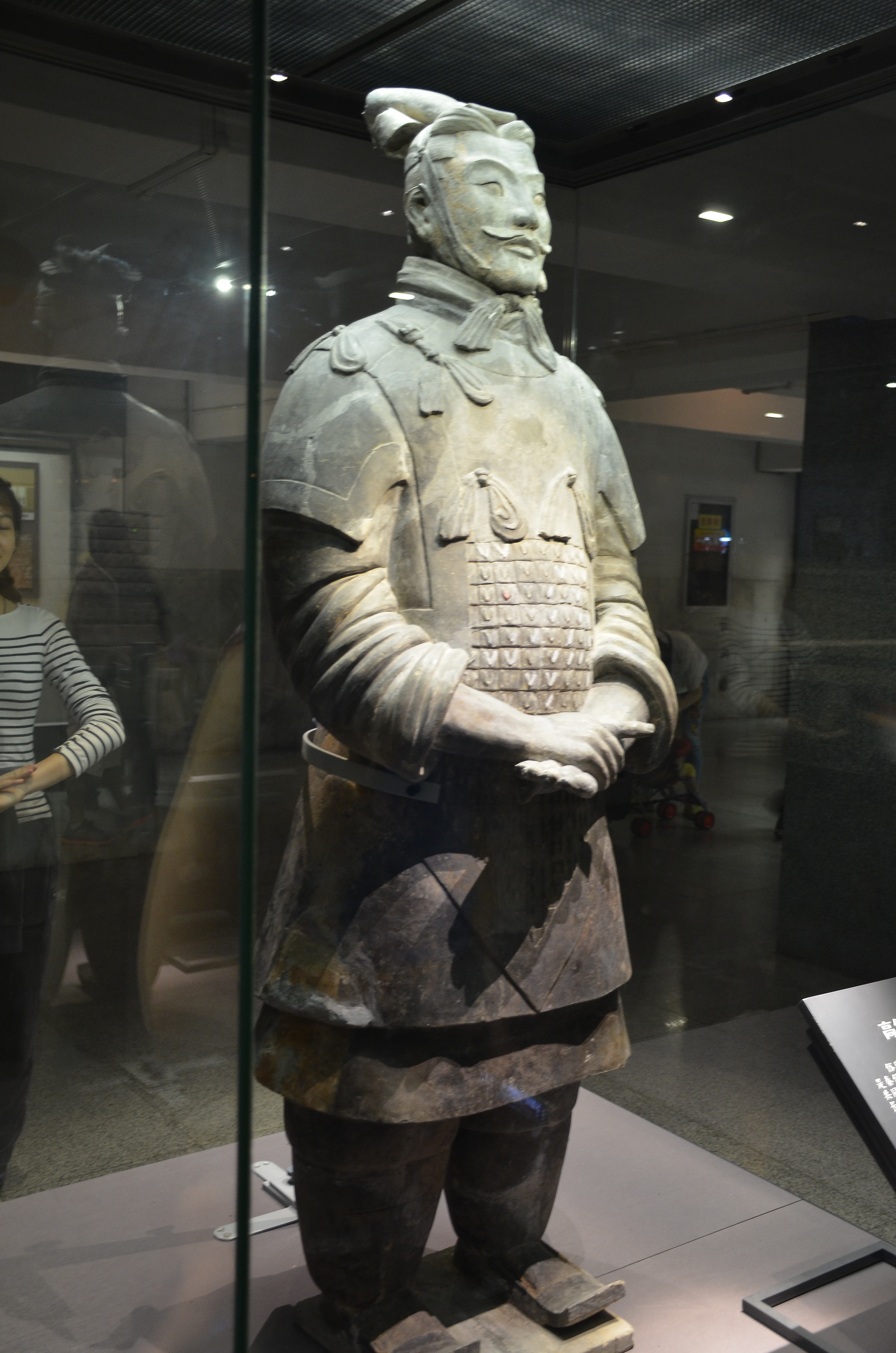
A terracotta general

==== The warriors ====
The terracotta figures are life-sized, typically ranging from 1.75 metres (5 ft 9 in) to about 2 metres (6 ft 7 in) (the officers are typically taller). They vary in height, uniform, and hairstyle in accordance with their portrayed rank. Their faces appear to be different for each individual figure. Scholars have identified 10 base facial forms which were then further developed to give each figure individuality in terms of facial morphology. The figures are of these general types: armored infantry; unarmored infantry; cavalrymen who wear a pillbox hat; helmeted drivers of chariots with more armor protection; spear-carrying charioteers; kneeling crossbowmen or archers who are armored; standing archers who are not; as well as generals and other lower-ranking officers. There are, however, many variations in the uniforms within the ranks: for example, some may wear shin pads while others not; they may wear either long or short trousers, some of which may be padded; and their body armors vary depending on rank, function, and position in formation. There are also terracotta horses placed among the warrior figures.

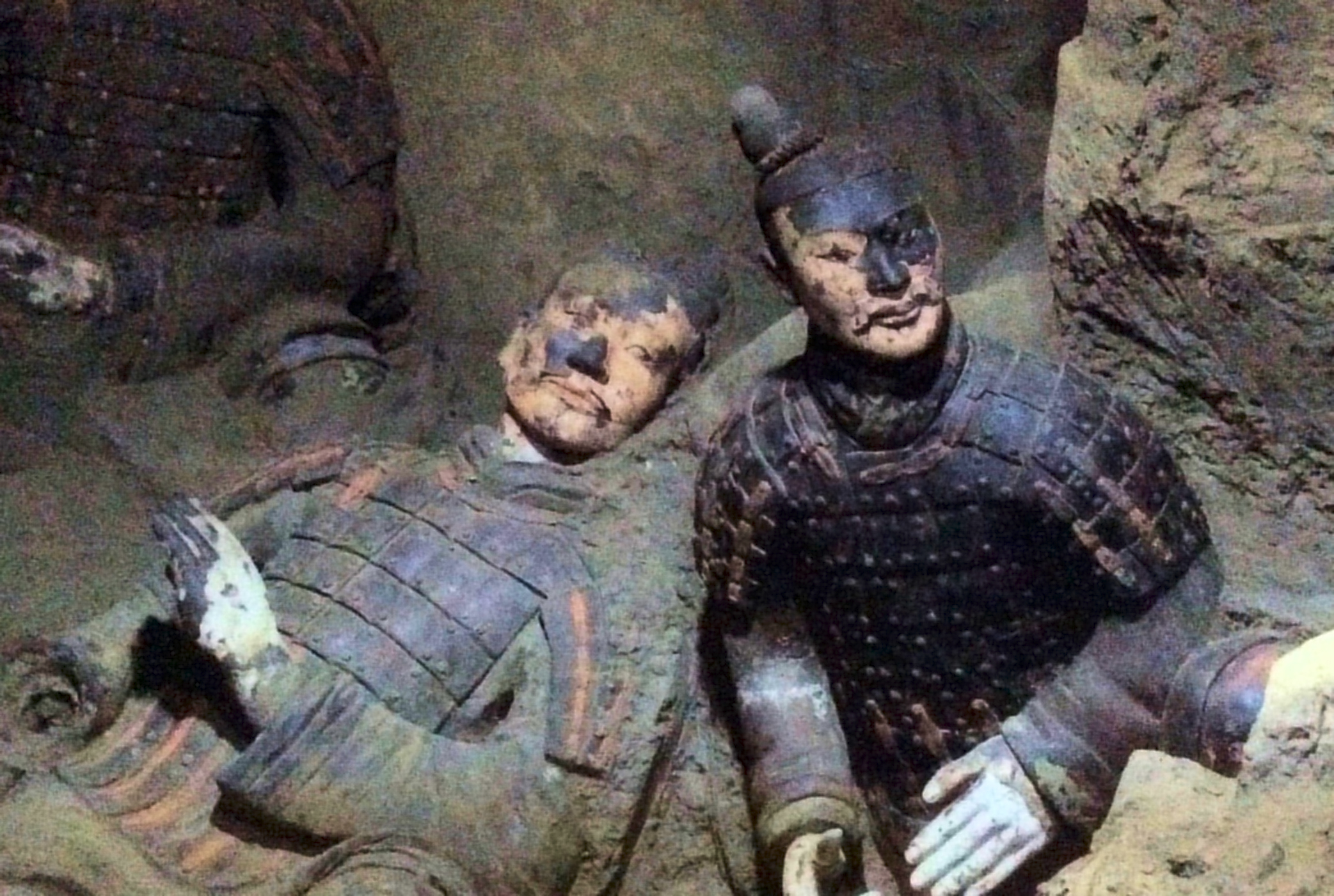
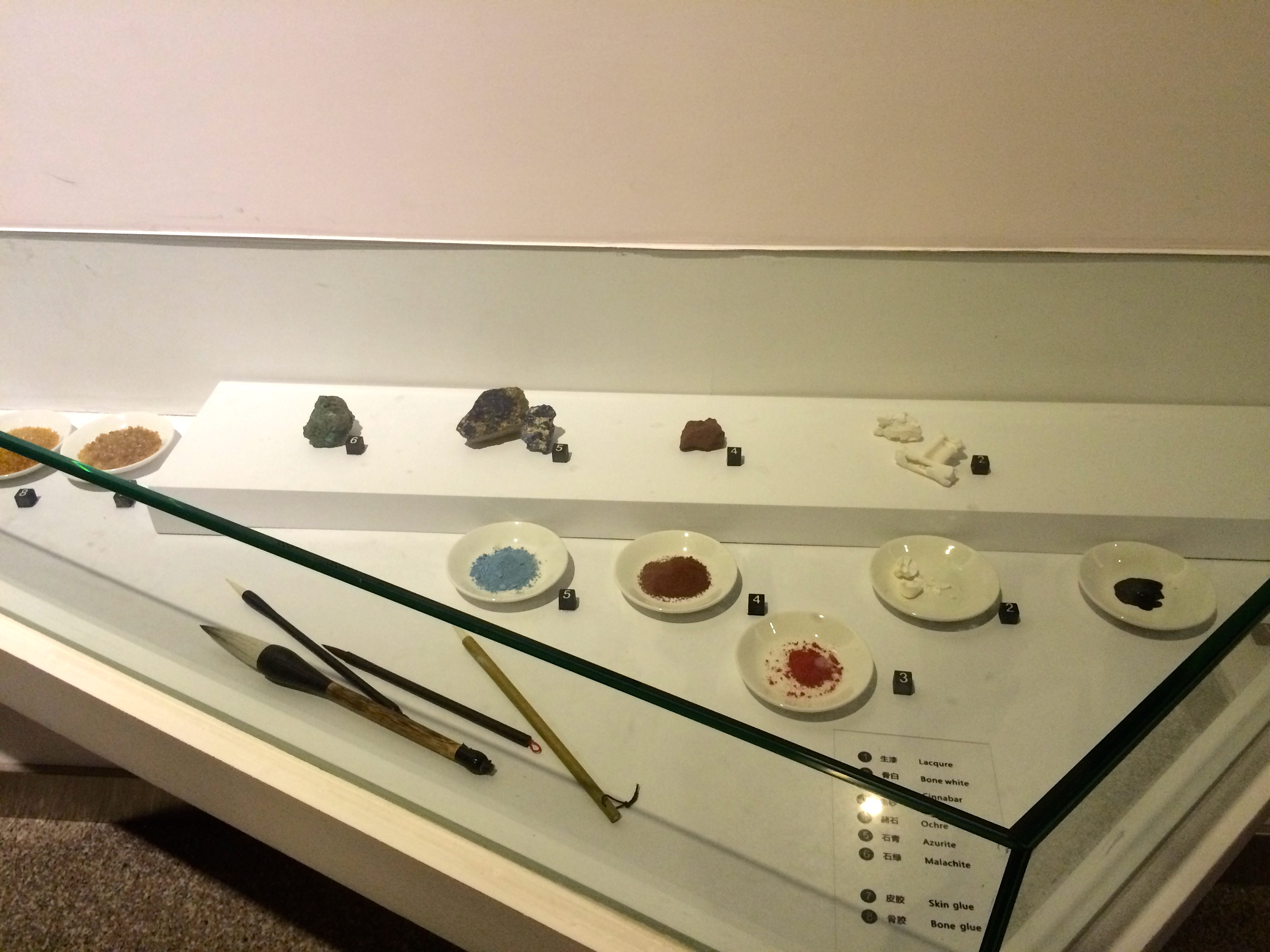
Figures with some of their natural coloring, and the pigments used on the Terracotta warriors

Originally, the figures were painted with ground precious stones, intensely fired bones (white), pigments of iron oxide (dark red), cinnabar (red), malachite (green), azurite (blue), charcoal (black), cinnabar barium copper silicate mix (Chinese purple or Han purple), tree sap from a nearby source (more than likely from the Chinese lacquer tree) (brown), and other colors including pink, lilac, red, and one unidentified color. The colored lacquer finish and individual facial features would have given the figures a realistic feel, with eyebrows and facial hair in black and the faces done in pink.

However, in Xi'an's dry climate, much of the color coating would flake off in less than four minutes after removing the mud surrounding the army.

The sculptors of the figures signed their names in the figures' armpits.

==== The acrobats ====
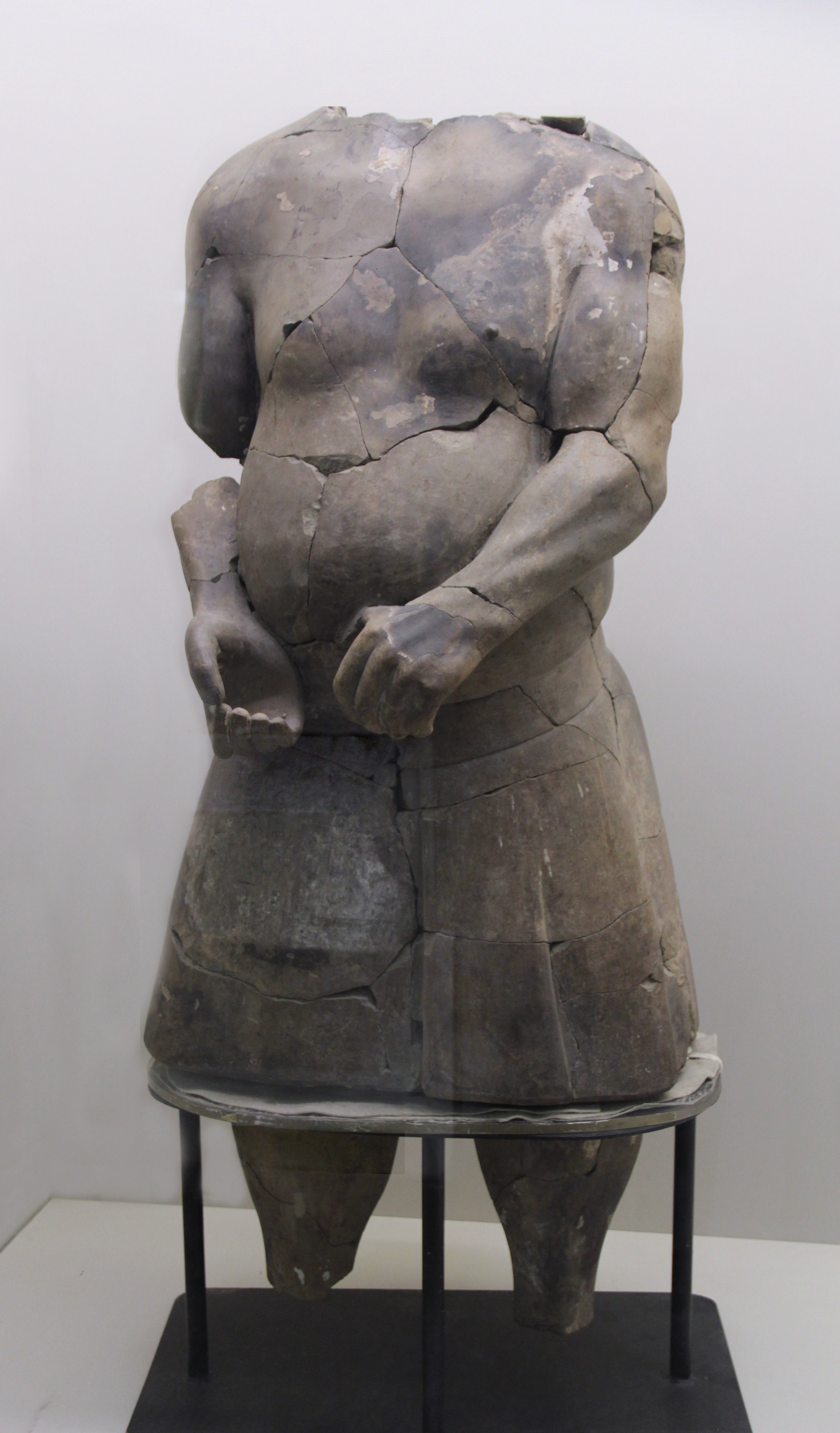
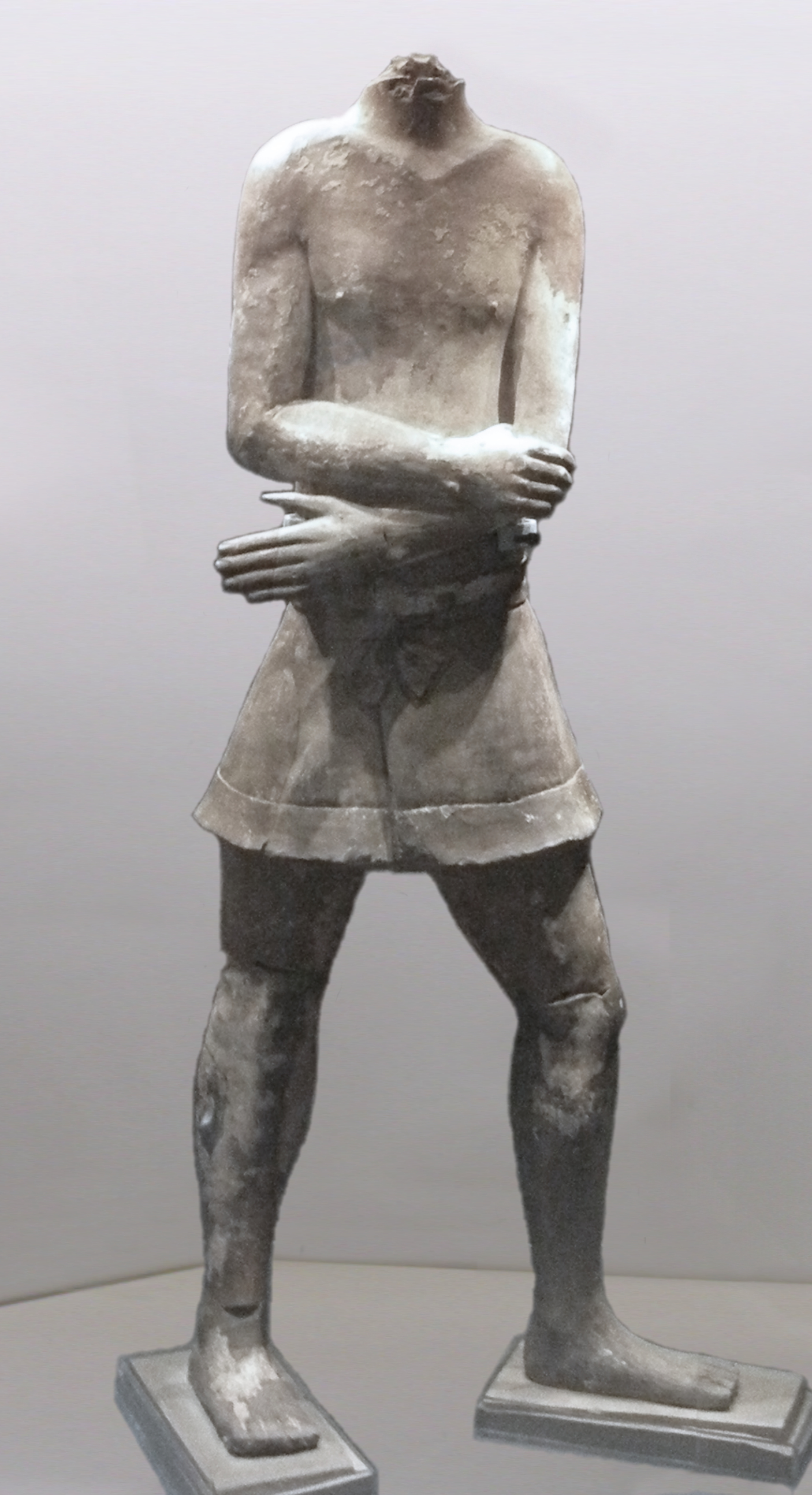
Two of The Acrobats from pit K9901.

Excavations in Pit K9901 uncovered in 1999, a series of associated terracotta sculptures that have been dubbed The Acrobats, which have been remarked to display an advanced understanding of human anatomy. The original function of these statues remains unclear, but they have been described as either potentially acrobat or dancer figures. The number of these figures uncovered thus far are relatively few compared to the more noted warrior figures, with the total discovered probably numbering a dozen. The figures are bare with the exception of a loincloth as dress. These figures are very vivid and less stereotypical than the soldiers, especially through the dynamic treatment of the musculature and bone joints. Some of the men are very lean, while others have massive bodies. Several of them are shown in the process of moving or making gestures. These terracotta statues demonstrate an advanced mastery of the depiction of the shapes and proportions of the human body.

Eleven of such figurines from Pit K9901 have since been subsequently unearthed with seven of them found in a degree of preservation that made them capable of being largely reconstructed from their fragment shards.

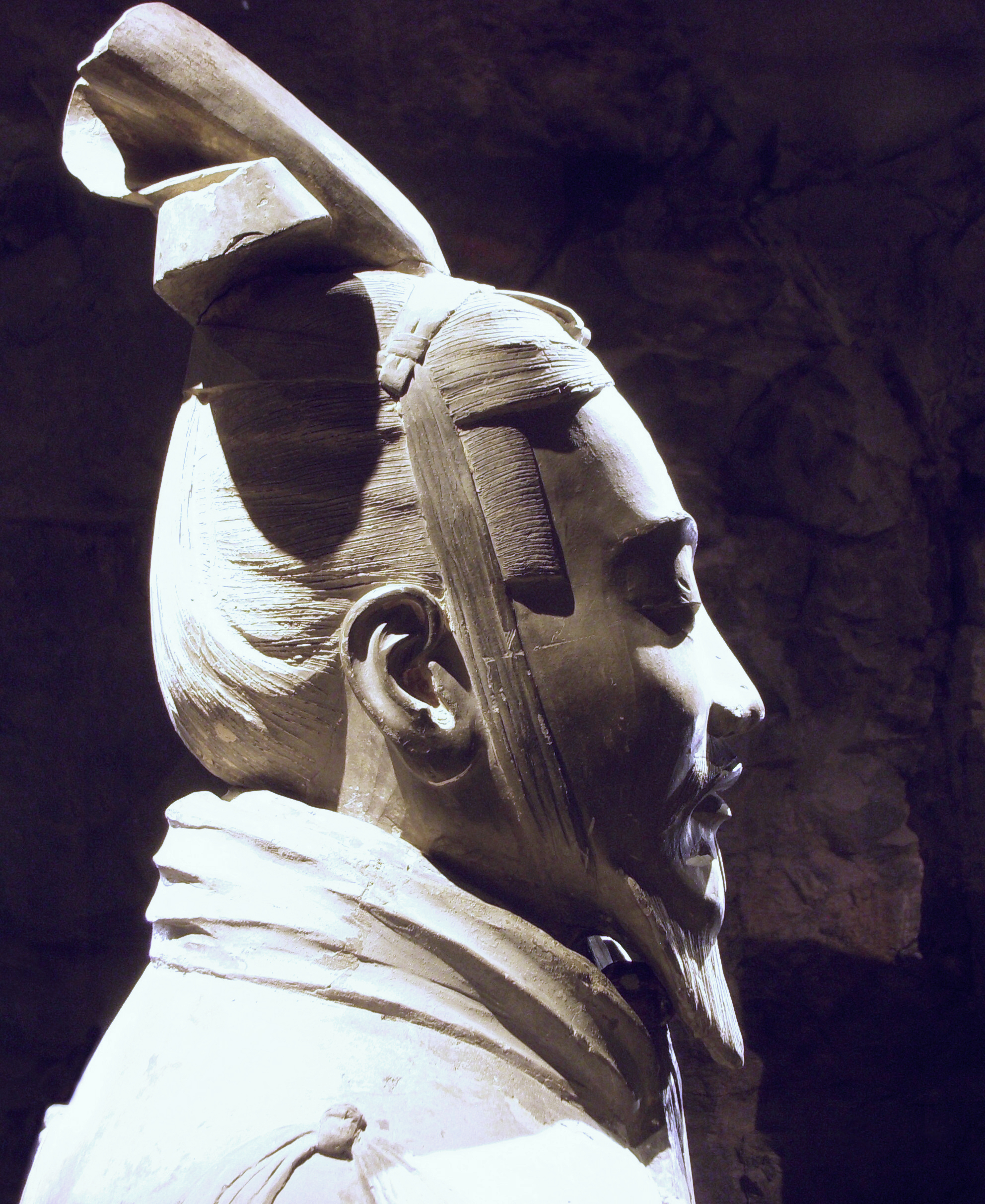
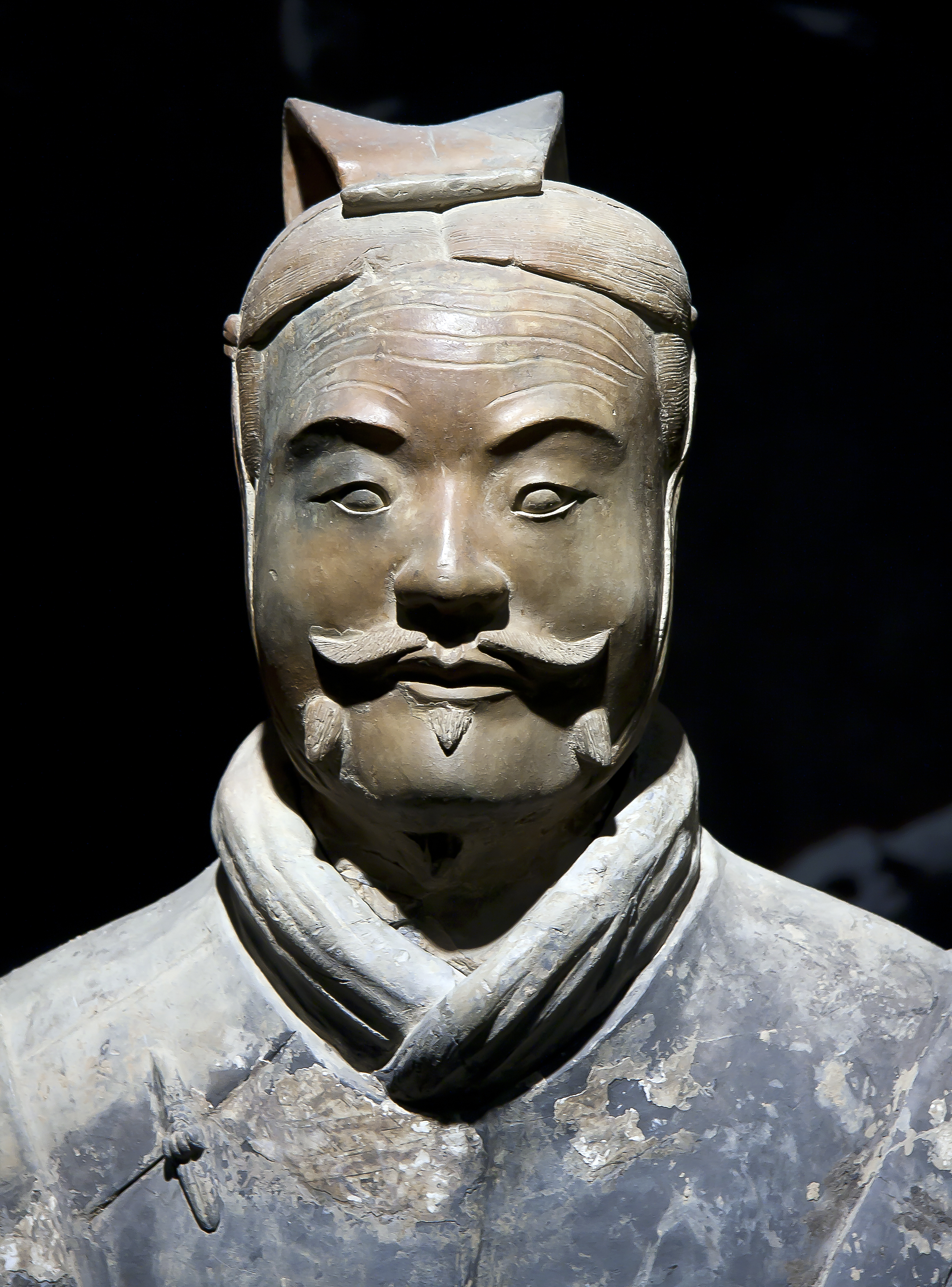
Army general (left), mid-rank officer (right)

==== Speculations on possible influences ====
Since the time of their discovery, the figures have been noted for their exceptional stylistic realism and individualism, with assessments having found that no two figures share the exact same features. The earliest note on this aspect was that of 20th century art historian German Hafner who, in 1986, was the first to speculate on a possible Hellenistic link to these sculptures due to the unusual display of naturalism relative to general Qin era sculpture: "the art of the terracotta army originated from Western contact". Duan Qingbo, site chief archaeologist from 1998 to 2006, noted that "the only thing" in extant archaeology which may hold a close similarity to the figures in terms of their artistic style is that of the later 1st century BCE Central Asian Khalchayan statuary. Li Xiuzhen, a senior archaeologist of the Mausoleum Site Museum, also acknowledged the possibility of Hellenistic influences, stating: "we now think the Terracotta Army, the acrobats and the bronze sculptures found on site were inspired by ancient Greek sculptures and art." Li later said that this quote was taken out of context by BBC reporters, who ignored much of what she told them and overstated her comment on Western inspiration. She said that "the terracotta warriors may be inspired by Western culture, but were uniquely made by the Chinese," and many local elements also contributed to the creation of the Terracotta Army. She did not believe that there was a direct person to person transfer of knowledge such as a Greek artisan teaching techniques to workers who contributed to the Terracotta Army, which she accused BBC of making it seem as though she did by using her quote to bolster another scholar's claim that such an event occurred.

Johanna Hanink and Felipe Rojas Silva of Brown University argued that such speculations rest on flawed and old Eurocentric ideas that assumed other civilizations were incapable of sophisticated artistry and thus foreign artistry must be seen through Western traditions. Zhang Weixing, the chief archaeologist and archaeological work department director of the Mausoleum Site Museum, stated that "there is no substantial evidence at all" for any such linkage. Raoul McLaughlin, an independent researcher on Roman trade, stated that there is no Greek influence on the Terracotta Army and emphasized the differences in artisanship, construction material, and symbology. Darryl Wilkinson of Dartmouth College has instead argued that the Qin era display of sculptural naturalism, alongside that of the pre-Columbian Moche culture in Peru, indicate that "the Greeks did not invent naturalism" and that "sculptural naturalism is not the product of any one culture's civilizational 'genius.'"

=== Construction ===
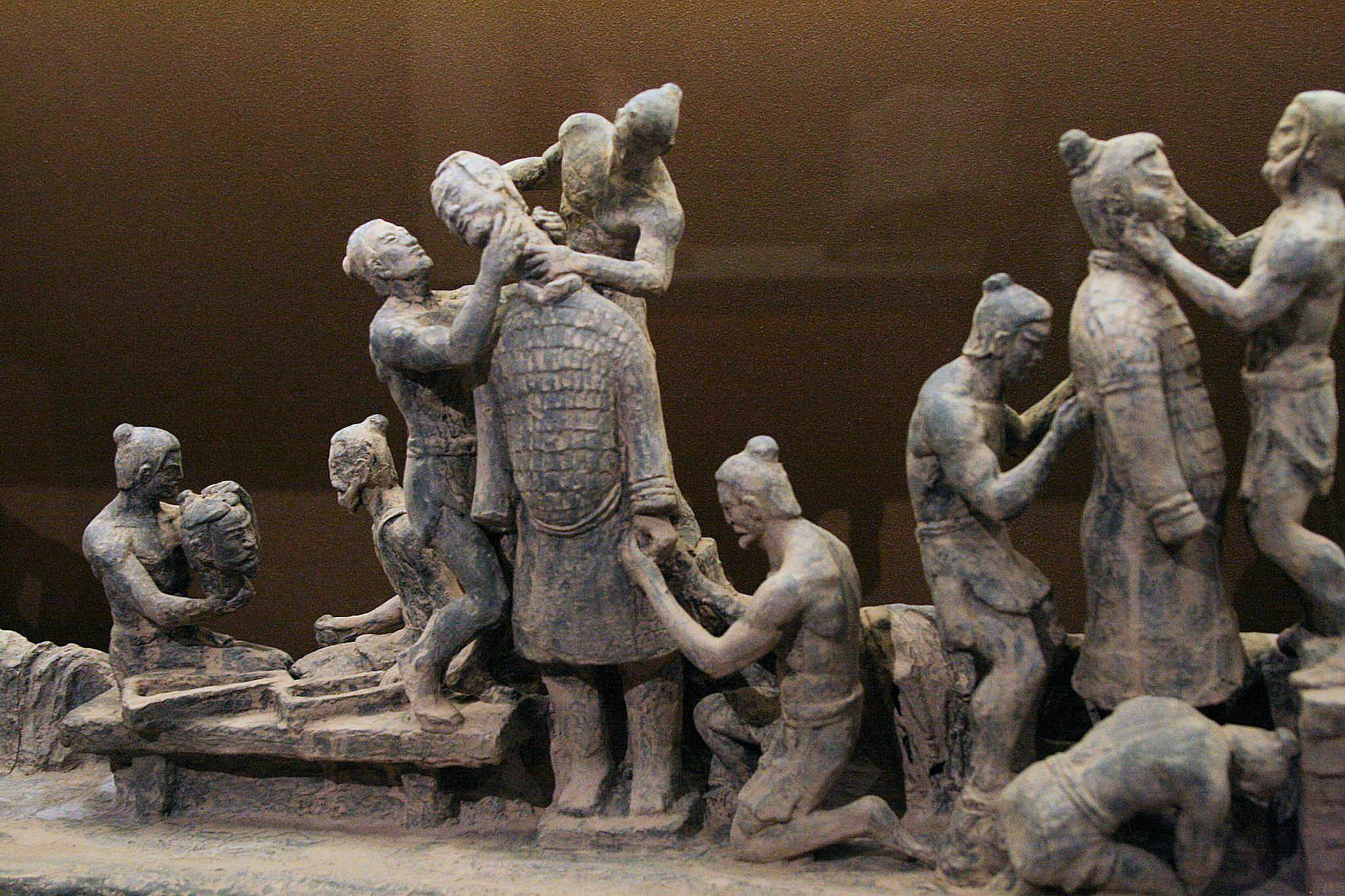
Construction of the terracotta statues: a modern diorama by the Mausoleum Site Museum.

The terracotta army figures were manufactured in workshops by government laborers and local craftsmen using local materials. Heads, arms, legs, and torsos were created separately and then assembled by luting the pieces together. When completed, the terracotta figures were placed in the pits in precise military formation according to rank and duty. In 2021, morphological studies have shown that there is a strong resemblance between the statues and that of the local region's modern inhabitants, which has led some scholars to theorize that the high level of stylistic realism stems from the figures being modelled on actual soldiers. The faces were created using molds, and at least ten face molds may have been used. Clay was then added after assembly to provide individual facial features to make each figure appear different. It is believed that the warriors' legs were made in much the same way that terracotta drainage pipes were manufactured at the time. This would classify the process as assembly line production, with specific parts manufactured and assembled after being fired, as opposed to crafting a figure as one solid piece and subsequently firing it. In those times of tight imperial control, each workshop was required to inscribe its name on items produced to ensure quality control. This has aided modern historians in verifying which workshops were commandeered to make tiles and other mundane items for the terracotta army.

==== Mass grave pit of the Necropolis workers ====
A grave pit was discovered and excavated in 2003 with 121 skeletons retrieved which has been identified by scholars to be attributable to the site workers. The individuals have been assessed to be predominantly from the age range of 15 to 40 years old, with an average height of around 170 centimetres (5 ft 7 in).

Many studies have concentrated on analyzing these workers including craniometric as well as genetic studies, which were conducted to try to understand the workers' origins. According to Duan Qingbo, lead archaeologist and Director of Excavations at the Mausoleum from 1998 to 2006, DNA analysis of a group of 19 skeletons, in comparison with 33 contemporary Chinese individuals, showed that the workers and laborers analyzed exhibited a diverse range of ethnicities, traceable to that of both Han and minority ethnicities, with a particular concentration of individuals from southern China.

=== Weaponry ===
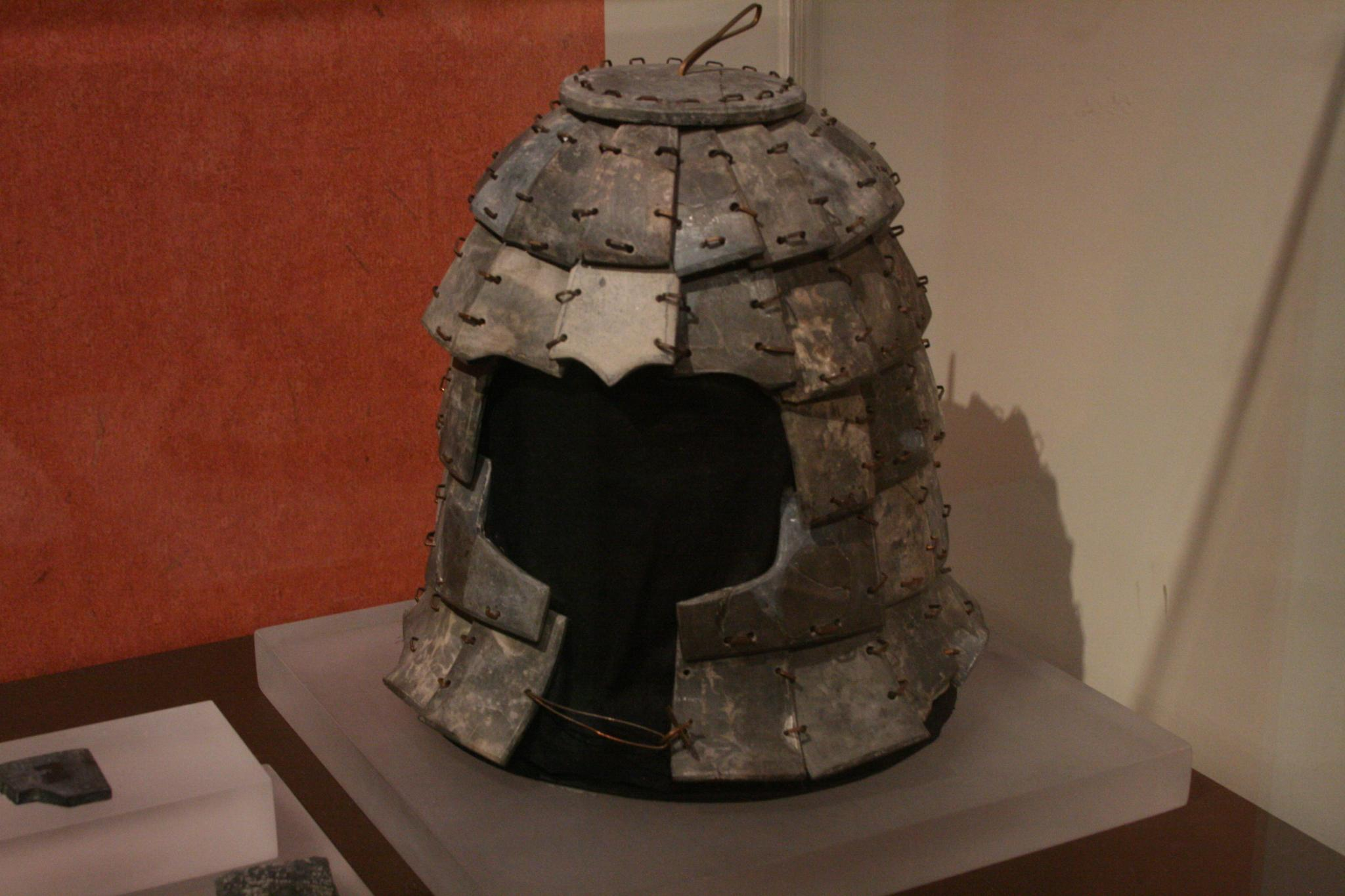
A bronze helmet unearthed from the site

Most of the figures originally held real weapons, which would have increased their realism. The majority of these weapons were looted shortly after the creation of the army or have rotted away. Despite this, over 40,000 bronze items of weaponry have been recovered, including swords, daggers, spears, lances, battle-axes, scimitars, shields, crossbows, and crossbow triggers. Most of the recovered items are arrowheads, which are usually found in bundles of 100 units. Studies of these arrowheads suggest that they were produced by self-sufficient, autonomous workshops using a process referred to as cellular production or Toyotism. Some weapons were coated with a 10–15 micrometer layer of chromium dioxide before burial that was believed to have protected them from any form of decay for the last 2200 years. However, research in 2019 indicated that the chromium was merely contamination from nearby lacquer, not a means of protecting the weapons. The slightly alkaline pH and small particle size of the burial soil most likely preserved the weapons.

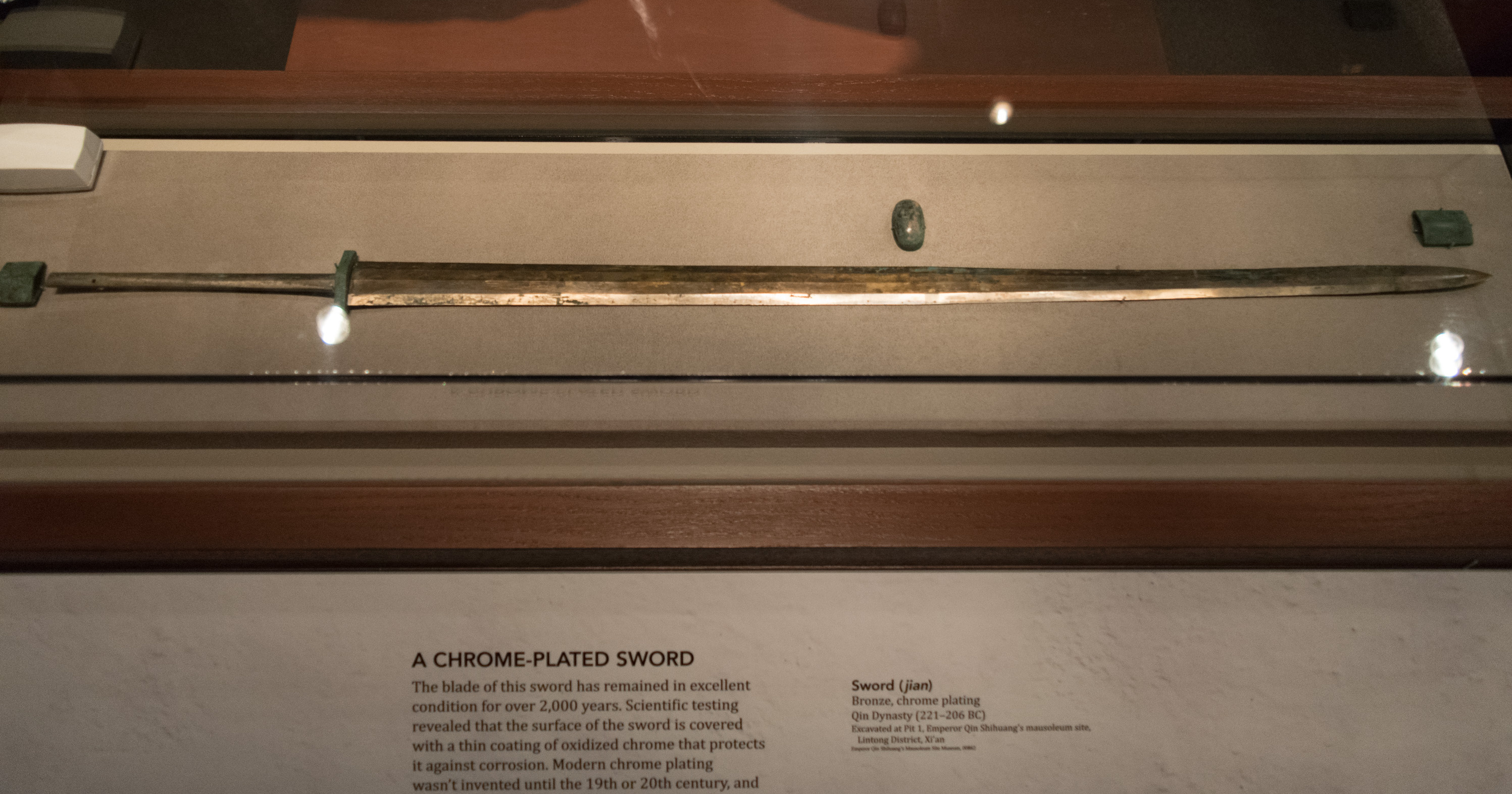
Bronze jian sword

The swords contain an alloy of copper, tin, and other elements including nickel, magnesium, and cobalt. Some carry inscriptions that date their manufacture to between 245 and 228 BCE, indicating that they were used before burial.

== Precedents and legacy ==
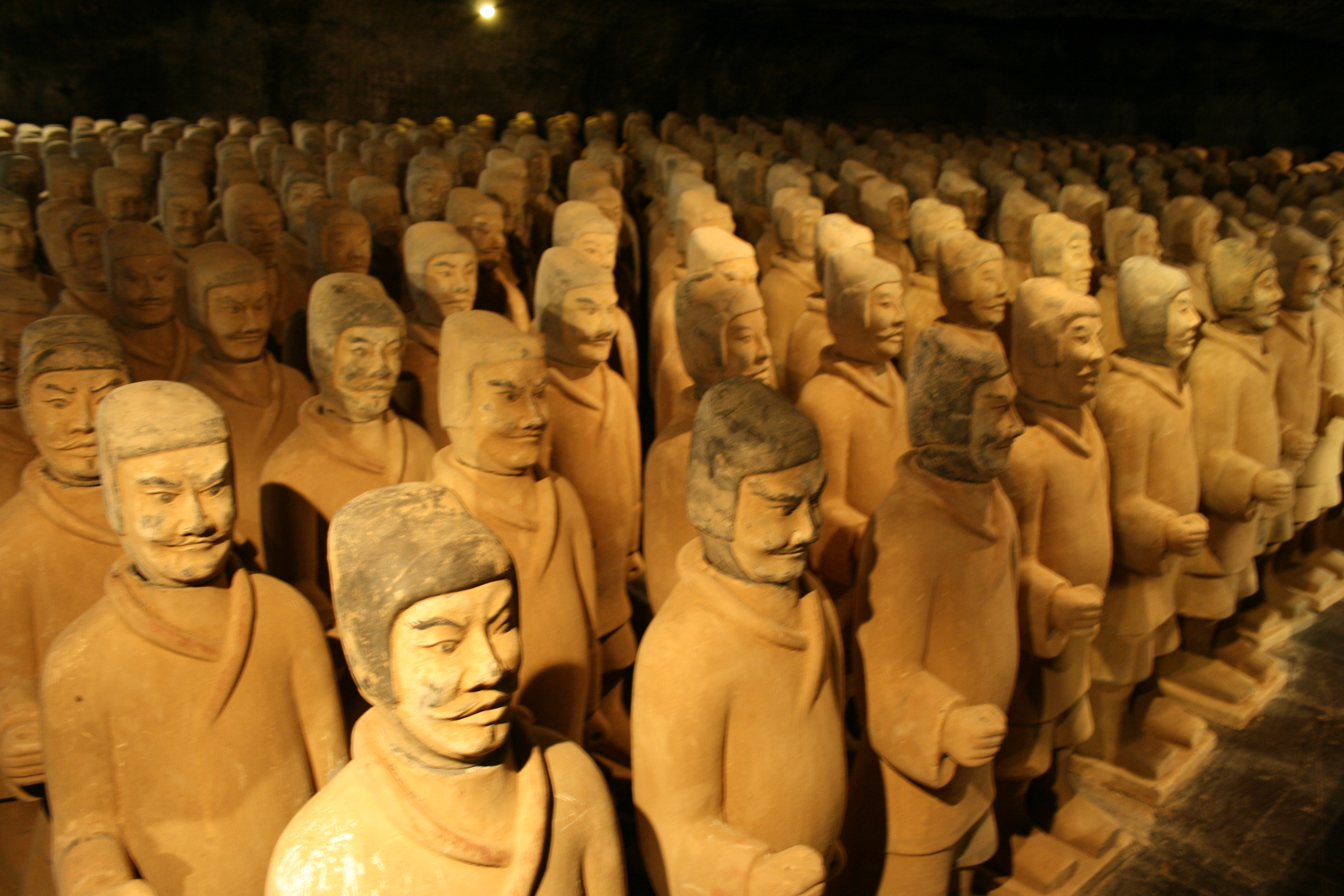
Han dynasty funerary terracotta from the mausoleum of Liu Wu, Prince of Liang.

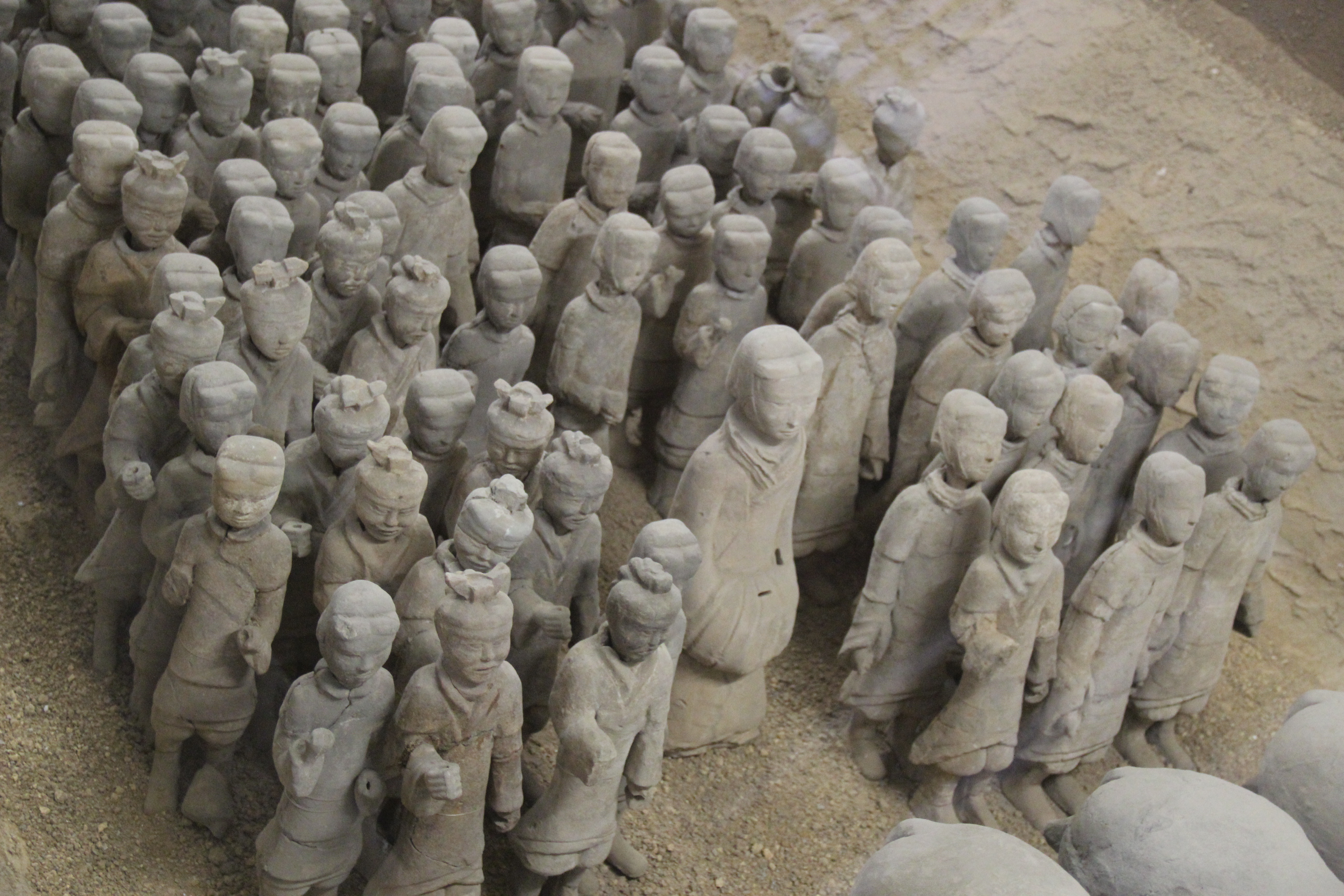
Han dynasty terracotta warriors of the Tomb of Liu Wu, Prince of Chu.

Only very few figurines are known from before the time of the terracotta army, so that the humanistic and animalistic style may have appeared dramatically new to their contemporaries. In extant archaeology, only rare and very small terracotta warrior figurines are known from the end of the Zhou dynasty in 4th-3rd century BCE, such as the Taerpo horserider, the first known representation of a cavalryman in China, from a military tomb in the Taerpo cemetery near Xianyang (Qin state of the Warring States period). The rider wears Central Asian, Scythian-style clothing, and his high pointed nose suggests he is a foreigner, but these early statuettes have been argued to lack the naturalistic and realistic quality of the Qin terracota army.

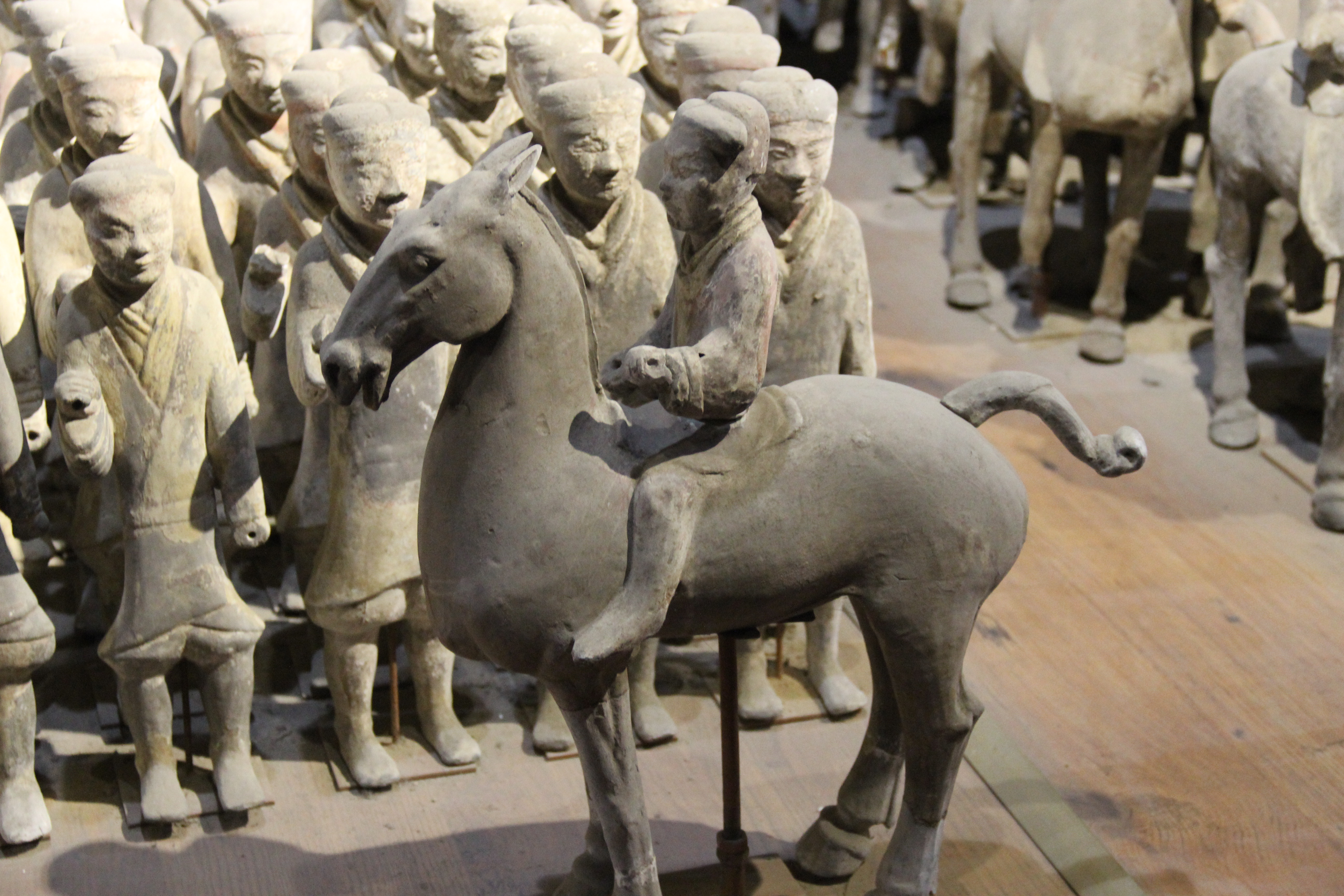
Terracotta Army from the Western Han Yangjiawan tomb.

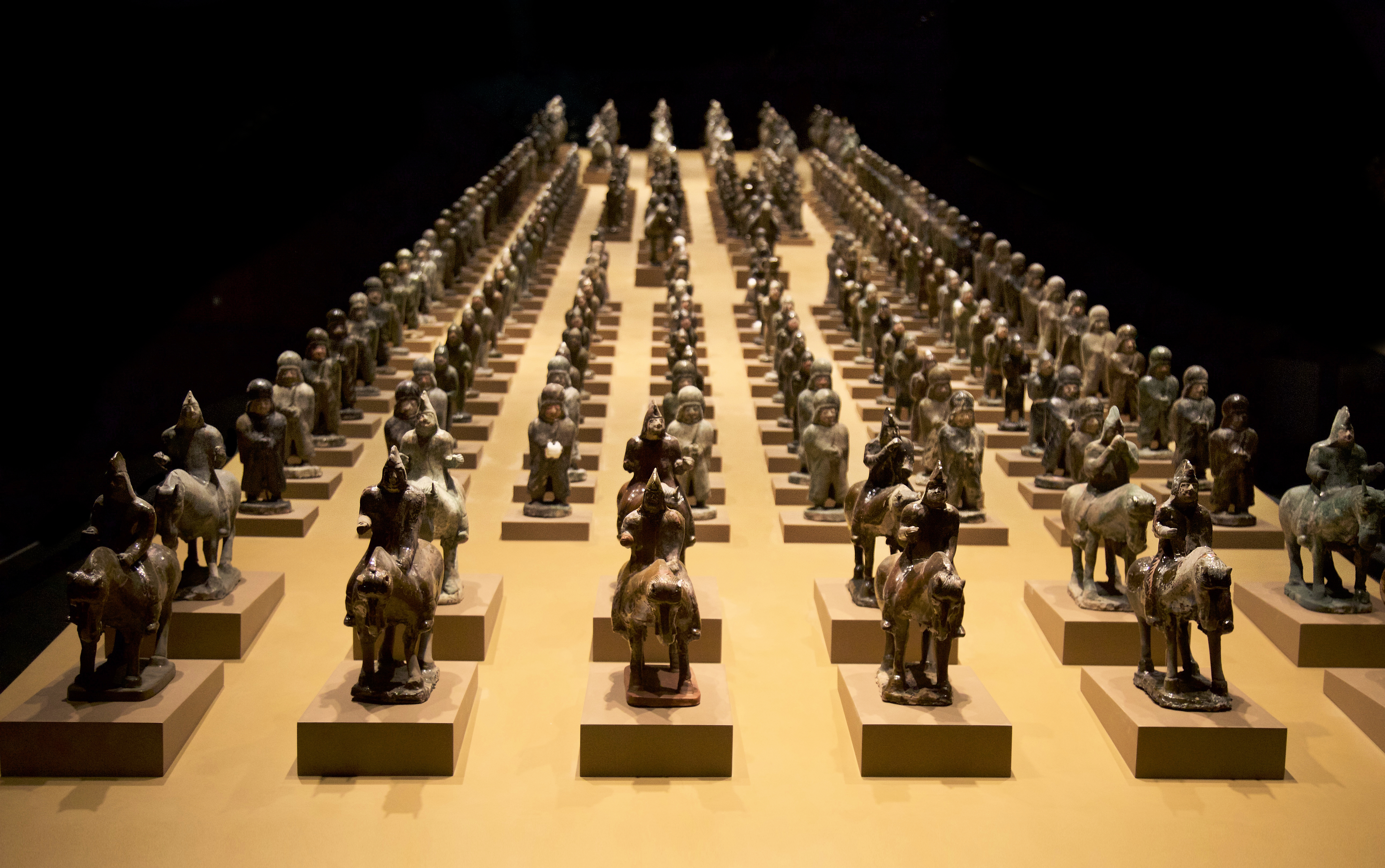
Figurines from tomb of Sima Jinlong, Northern Wei, 5th century.

The terracotta army left a legacy however, as funeral terracotta armies are known from later dynasties, although in a less stern and militaristic style, and with much smaller statuettes, such as the Western Han Yangjiawan terracotta army (195 BCE) or Yangling terracotta army (141 BCE). The human-sized monumental style of the Qin emperor has thus been observed by scholars to be a relatively short-lived artistic phase which would not reappear until the 4–6th centuries CE with the onset of monumental Buddhist sculpture in China.

== Scientific research ==
In 2007, scientists at Stanford University and the Advanced Light Source facility in Berkeley, California, reported that powder diffraction experiments combined with energy-dispersive X-ray spectroscopy and micro-X-ray fluorescence analysis showed that the process of producing terracotta figures colored with Chinese purple dye consisting of barium copper silicate was derived from the knowledge gained by Taoist alchemists in their attempts to synthesize jade ornaments.

Since 2006, an international team of researchers at the UCL Institute of Archaeology have been using analytical chemistry techniques to uncover more details about the production techniques employed in the creation of the Terracotta Army. Using X-ray fluorescence spectrometry of 40,000 bronze arrowheads bundled in groups of 100, the researchers reported that the arrowheads within a single bundle formed a relatively tight cluster that was different from other bundles. In addition, the presence or absence of metallic impurities was consistent within bundles. Based on the arrows' chemical compositions, the researchers concluded that a cellular manufacturing system similar to the one used in a modern Toyota factory, as opposed to a continuous assembly line in the early days of the automobile industry, was employed.

Grinding and polishing marks visible under a scanning electron microscope have provided evidence for the earliest industrial use of lathes for polishing.

According to a 2022 study, there is statistically no difference between the facial features of terracotta warriors and contemporary Chinese populations, particularly northern and western Chinese populations. However, the issue of terracotta warriors being potentially deformed and Chinese populations undergoing changes in their facial features due to climate change and dietary factors were not addressed.

== Exhibitions ==
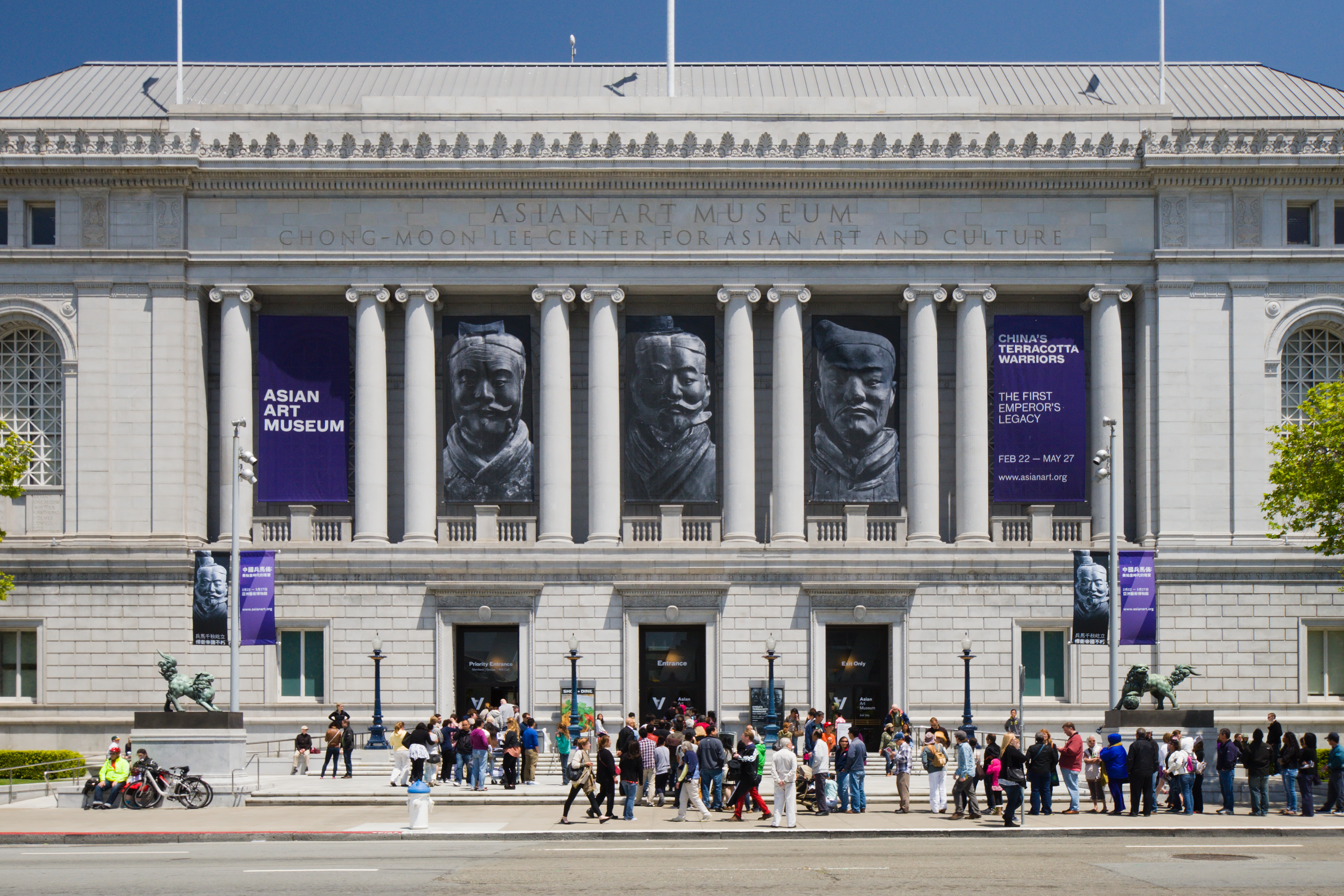
Terracotta Warriors exhibition in San Francisco, U.S.

The first exhibition of the figures outside of China was held at the National Gallery of Victoria (NGV) in Melbourne, Australia in 1982.

An exhibition tour of 120 real-size replicas of Terracotta statues was displayed in the German cities of Frankfurt am Main, Munich, Oberhof, Berlin (at the Palace of the Republic) and Nuremberg between 2003 and 2004.

Warriors and other artifacts were exhibited to the public at the Forum de Barcelona in Barcelona between 9 May and 26 September 2004. It was their most successful exhibition ever. The same exhibition was presented at the Fundación Canal de Isabel II in Madrid between October 2004 and January 2005, their most successful ever.

Between 15 June and 17 September 2006 the exhibition entitled "Los Guerreros de Terracota: Un Ejercito Inmortal" ("The Terracotta Warriors: An Immortal Army"), composed of 73 objects, were displayed at the National Museum of Colombia in Bogotá.

A collection of 120 objects from the mausoleum and 12 terracotta warriors were displayed at the British Museum in London as its special exhibition "The First Emperor: China's Terracotta Army" from 13 September 2007 to April 2008. This exhibition made 2008 the British Museum's most successful year and made the British Museum the United Kingdom's top cultural attraction between 2007 and 2008. The exhibition brought the most visitors to the museum since the King Tutankhamun exhibition in 1972. It was reported that the 400,000 advance tickets sold out so fast that the museum extended its opening hours until midnight. According to The Times, many people had to be turned away, despite the extended hours. During the day of events to mark the Chinese New Year, the crush was so intense that the gates to the museum had to be shut. The Terracotta Army has been described as the only other set of historic artifacts (along with the remnants of the wreck of the RMS Titanic) that can draw a crowd by the name alone.

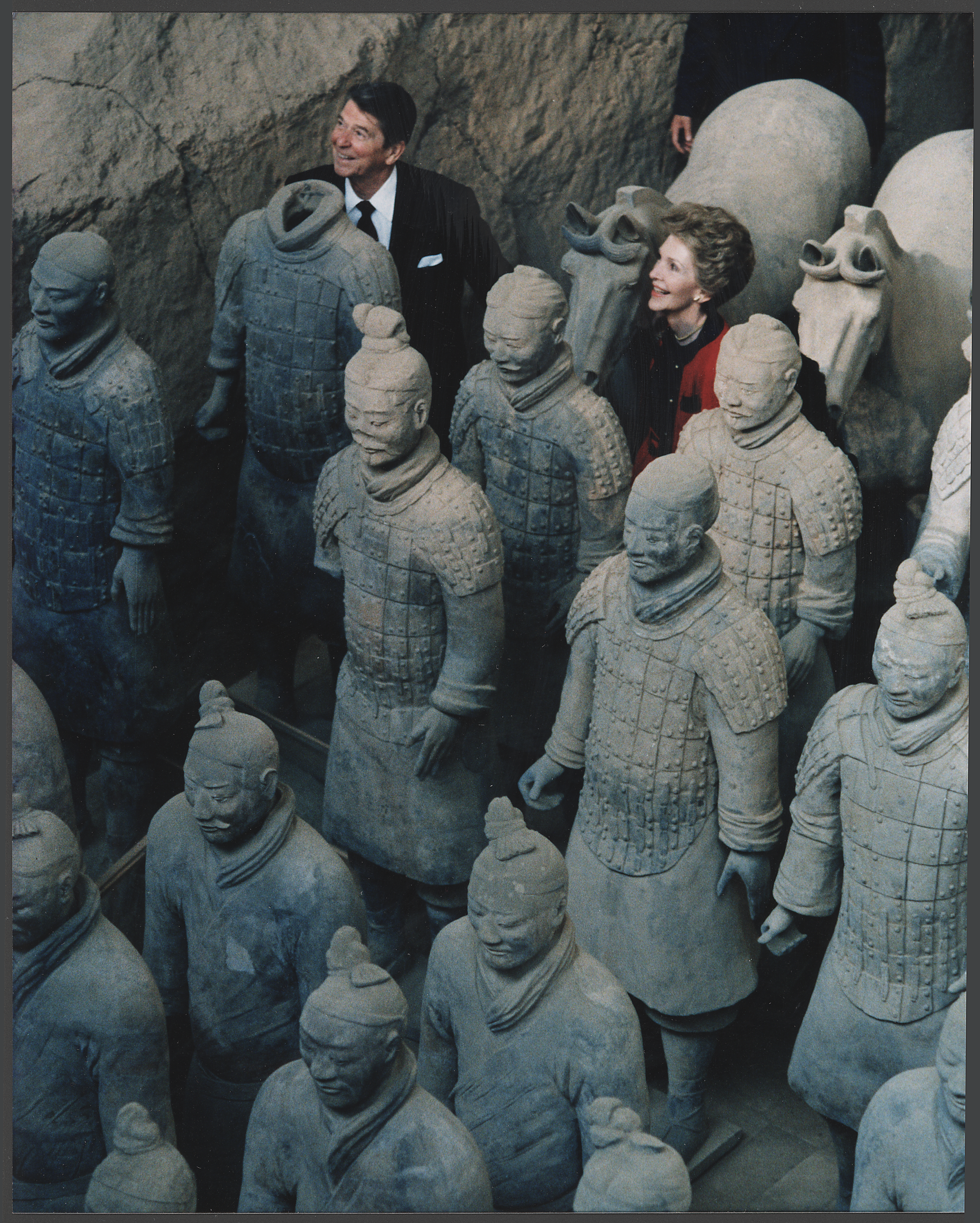
U.S. President Ronald Reagan and First Lady Nancy Reagan visiting the Terracotta Army in Xi'an, 1984

From December 2009 to May 2010, the exhibition was shown in the Centro Cultural La Moneda in Santiago de Chile.

The exhibition traveled to North America and visited museums such as the Asian Art Museum of San Francisco, Bowers Museum in Santa Ana, California, Houston Museum of Natural Science, High Museum of Art in Atlanta, National Geographic Society Museum in Washington, D.C., and the Royal Ontario Museum in Toronto. Subsequently, the exhibition traveled to Sweden and was hosted in the Museum of Far Eastern Antiquities between 28 August 2010 and 20 January 2011. The First Emperor – China's Entombed Warriors, an exhibition presenting 120 artifacts, was hosted at the Art Gallery of New South Wales between 2 December 2010 and 13 March 2011. L'Empereur guerrier de Chine et son armée de terre cuite ("The Warrior-Emperor of China and his terracotta army"), an exhibition featuring artifacts including statues from the mausoleum, was hosted by the Montreal Museum of Fine Arts from 11 February 2011 to 26 June 2011. In Italy, from July 2008 to 16 November 2008, five of the warriors of the terracotta army were displayed in Turin at the Museum of Antiquities, and from 16 April 2010 to 5 September 2010 nine statues including officials, lancers and an archer were displayed at the Royal Palace in Milan at the exhibition entitled "The Two Empires".

Soldiers and related items were on display from 15 March 2013 to 17 November 2013, at the Historical Museum of Bern.

Visual tour of the three main Terracotta Army pits (no audio).

Several Terracotta Army figures were on display, along with many other objects, in an exhibit entitled "Age of Empires: Chinese Art of the Qin and Han Dynasties" at The Metropolitan Museum of Art in New York City from 3 April 2017 to 16 July 2017. Terracotta Warriors of the First Emperor, an exhibition featuring ten Terracotta Army figures and other artifacts, was on display at the Pacific Science Center in Seattle, Washington, from 8 April 2017 to 4 September 2017 before traveling to The Franklin Institute in Philadelphia, Pennsylvania, to be exhibited from 30 September 2017 to 4 March 2018 with the addition of augmented reality.

An exhibition entitled "China's First Emperor and the Terracotta Warriors" was at the World Museum in Liverpool from 9 February 2018 to 28 October 2018.

An exhibition entitled "Terracotta Warriors. Legacy of the First Emperor" took place in the Western Australian Museum in Perth between June 2025 – February 2026.

The Guardians of Eternity was an exhibition at the Museum of Fine Arts in Budapest, Hungary, November 2025 – May 2026.

== Gallery ==
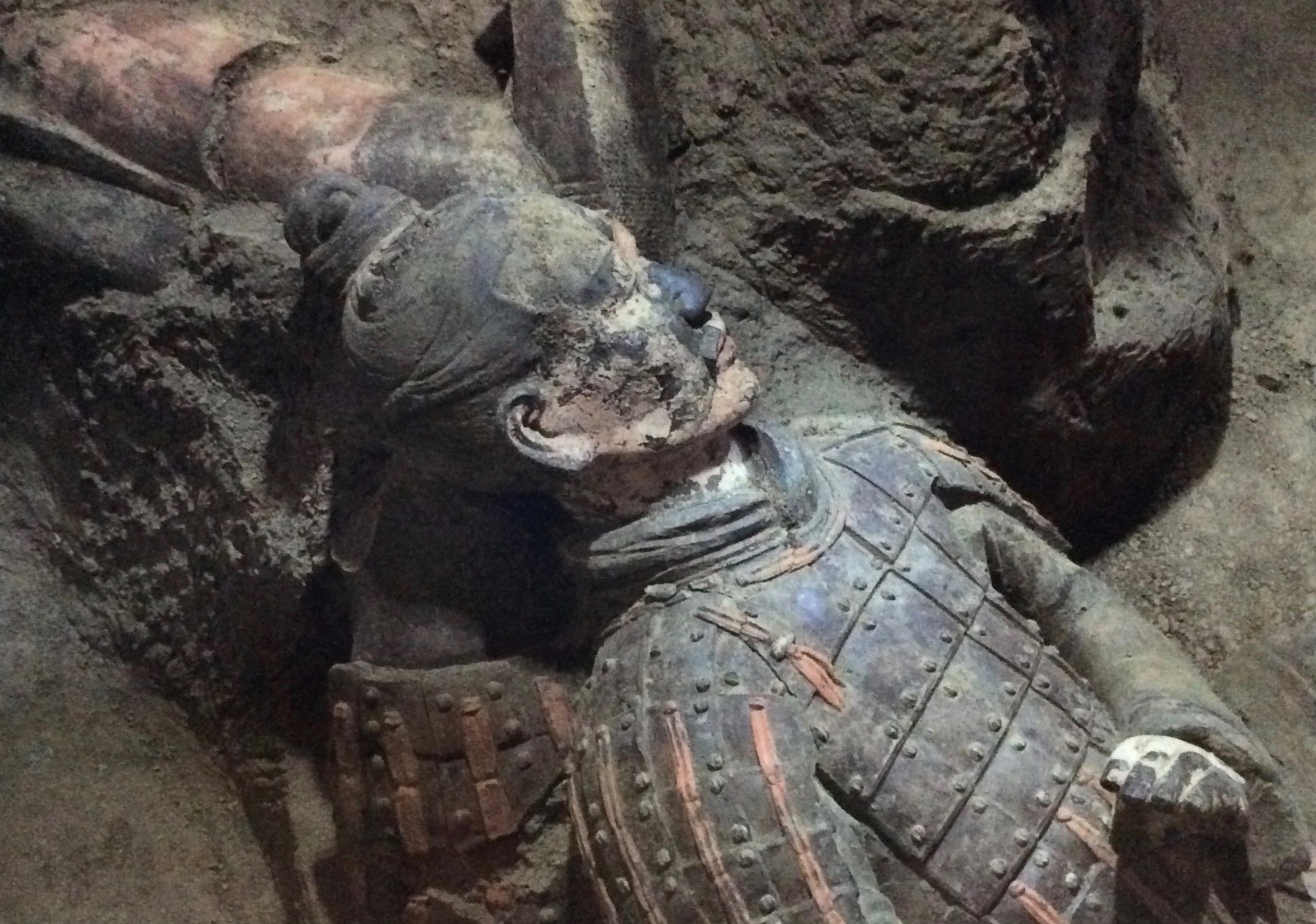

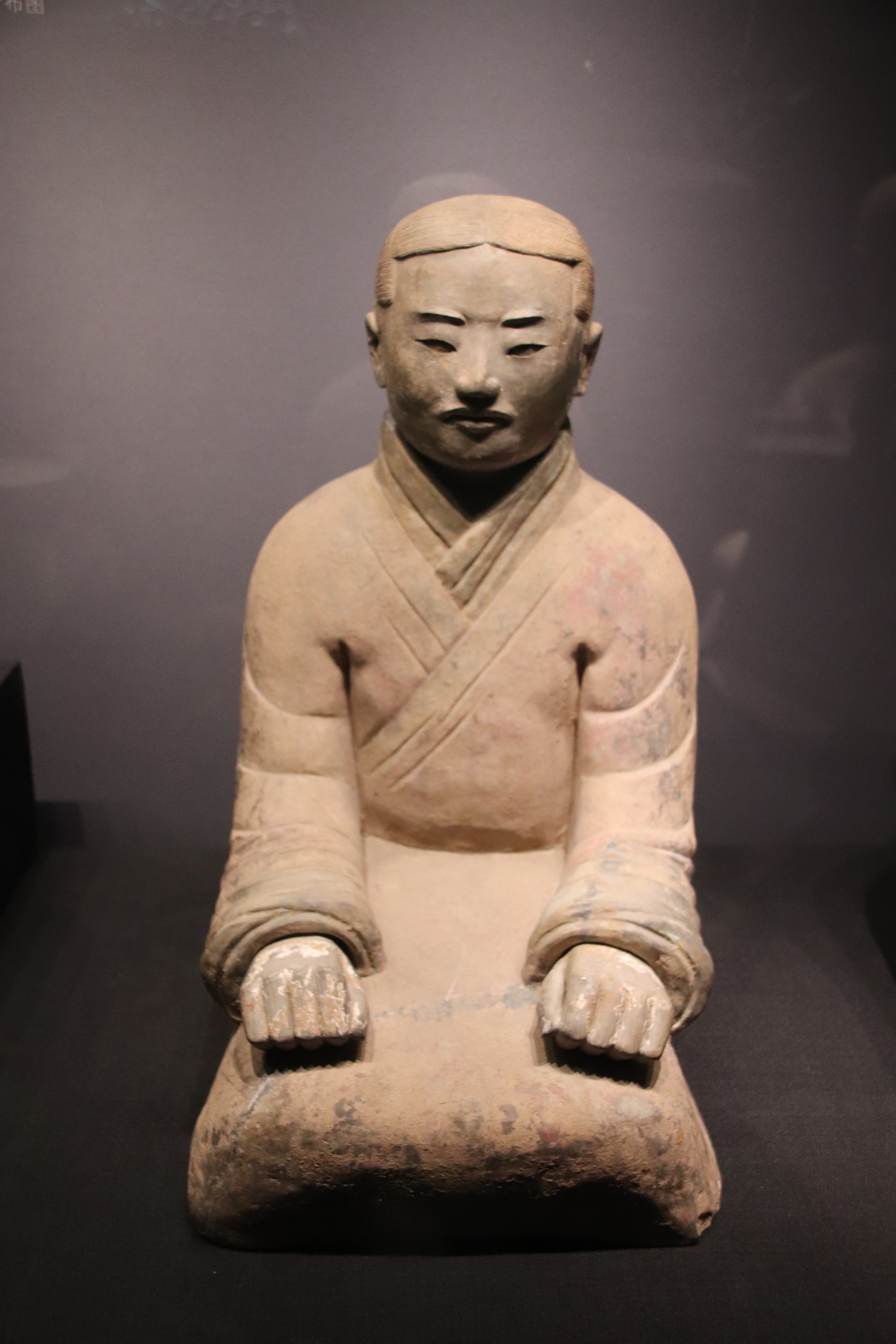

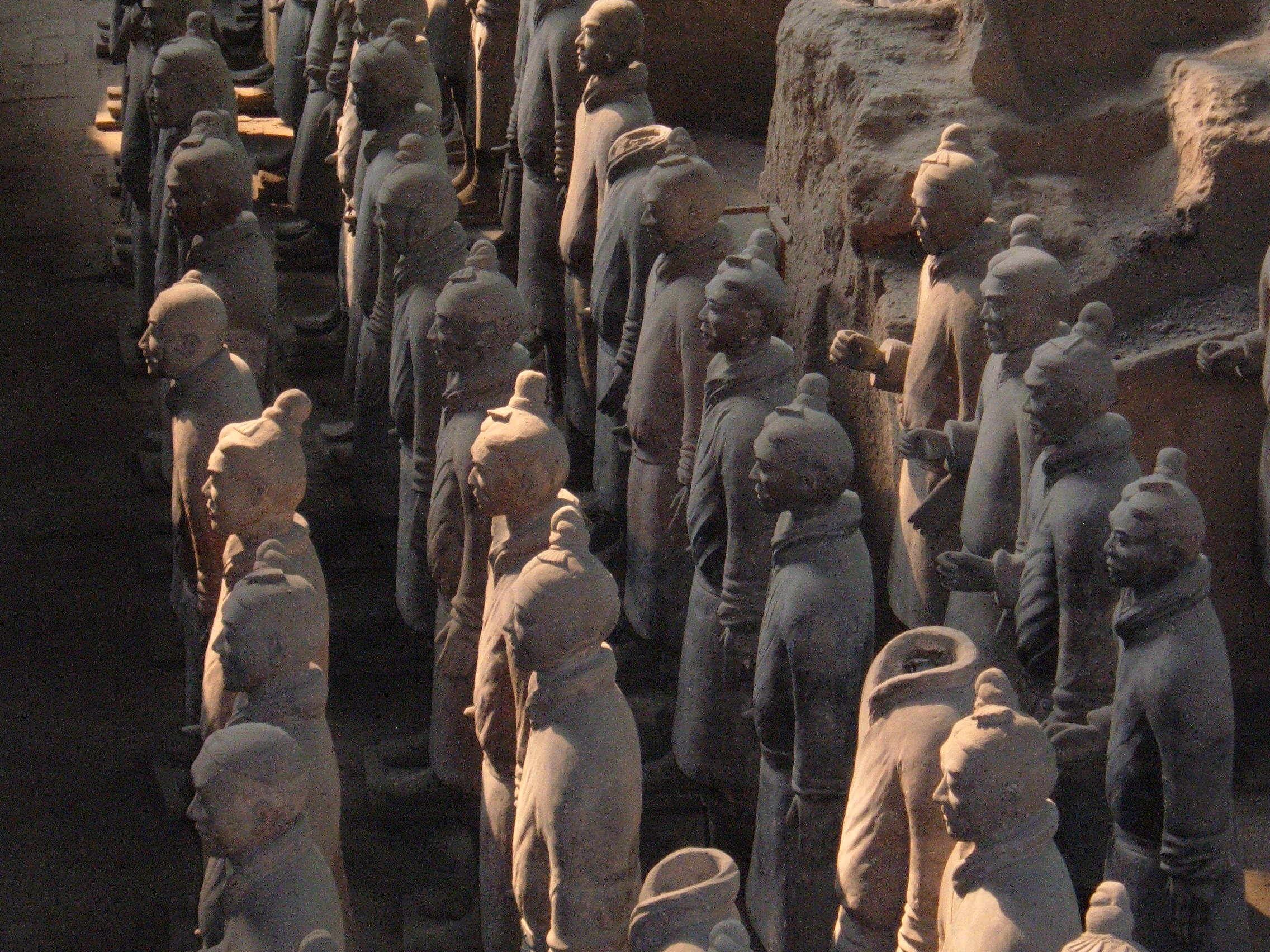

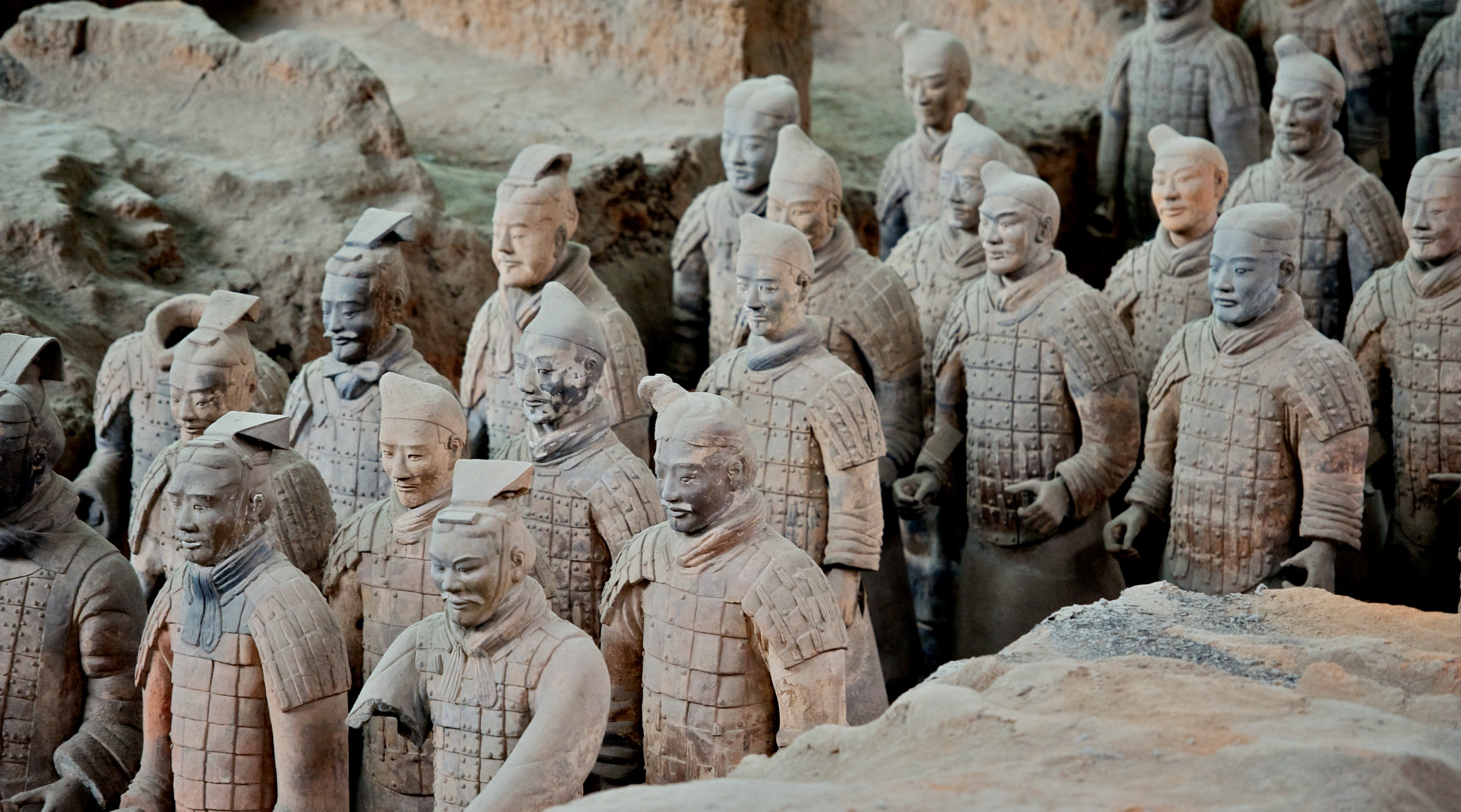

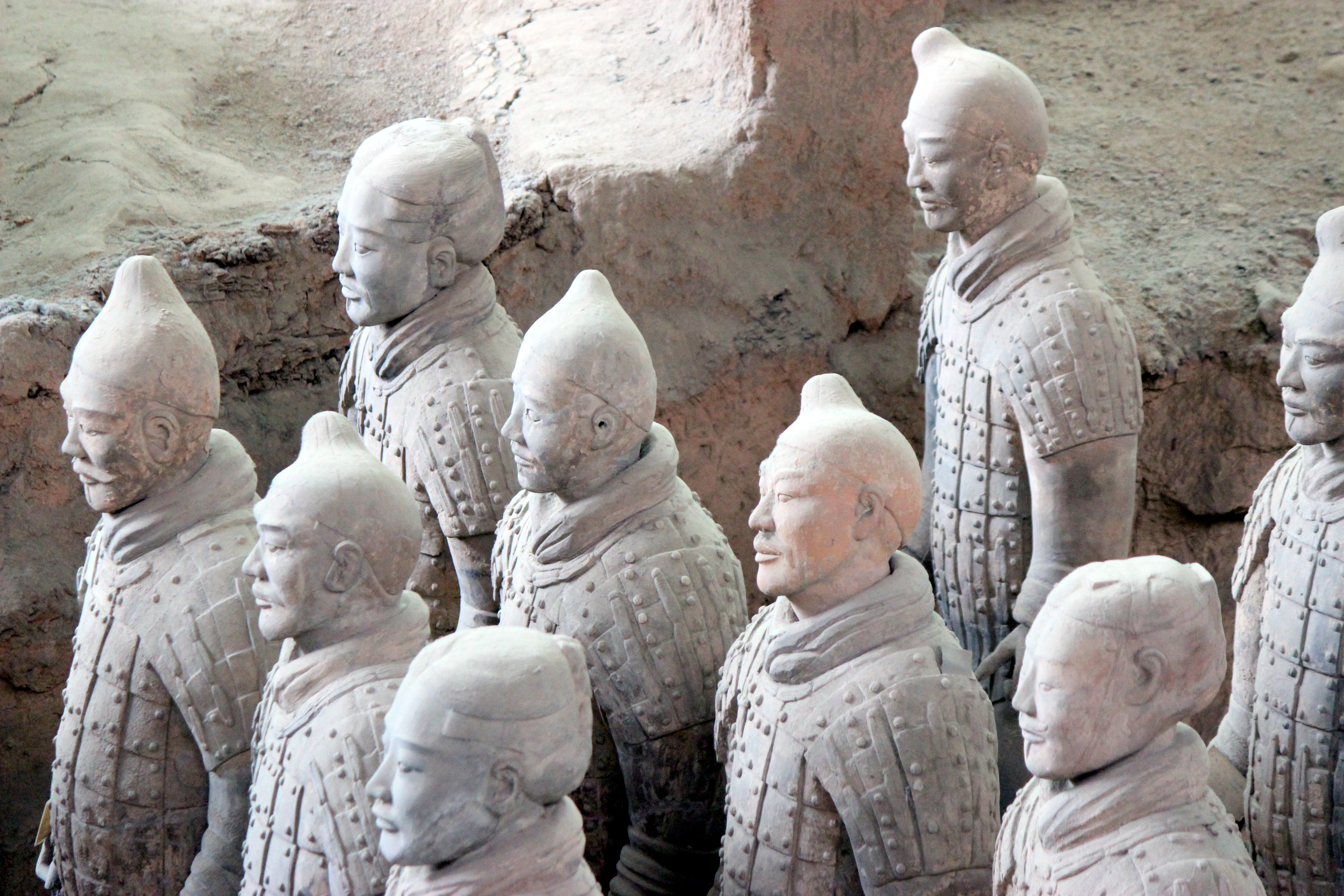

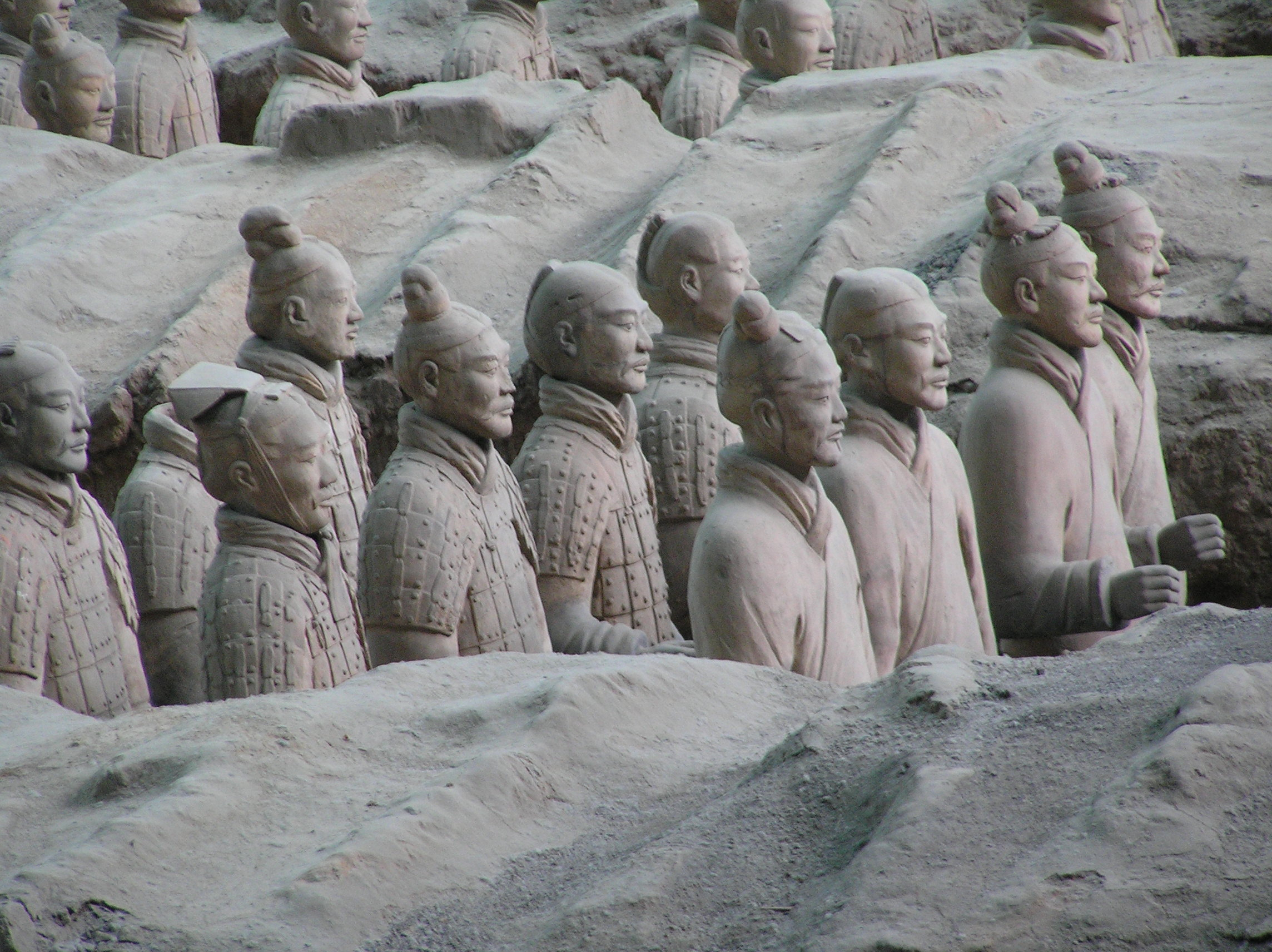

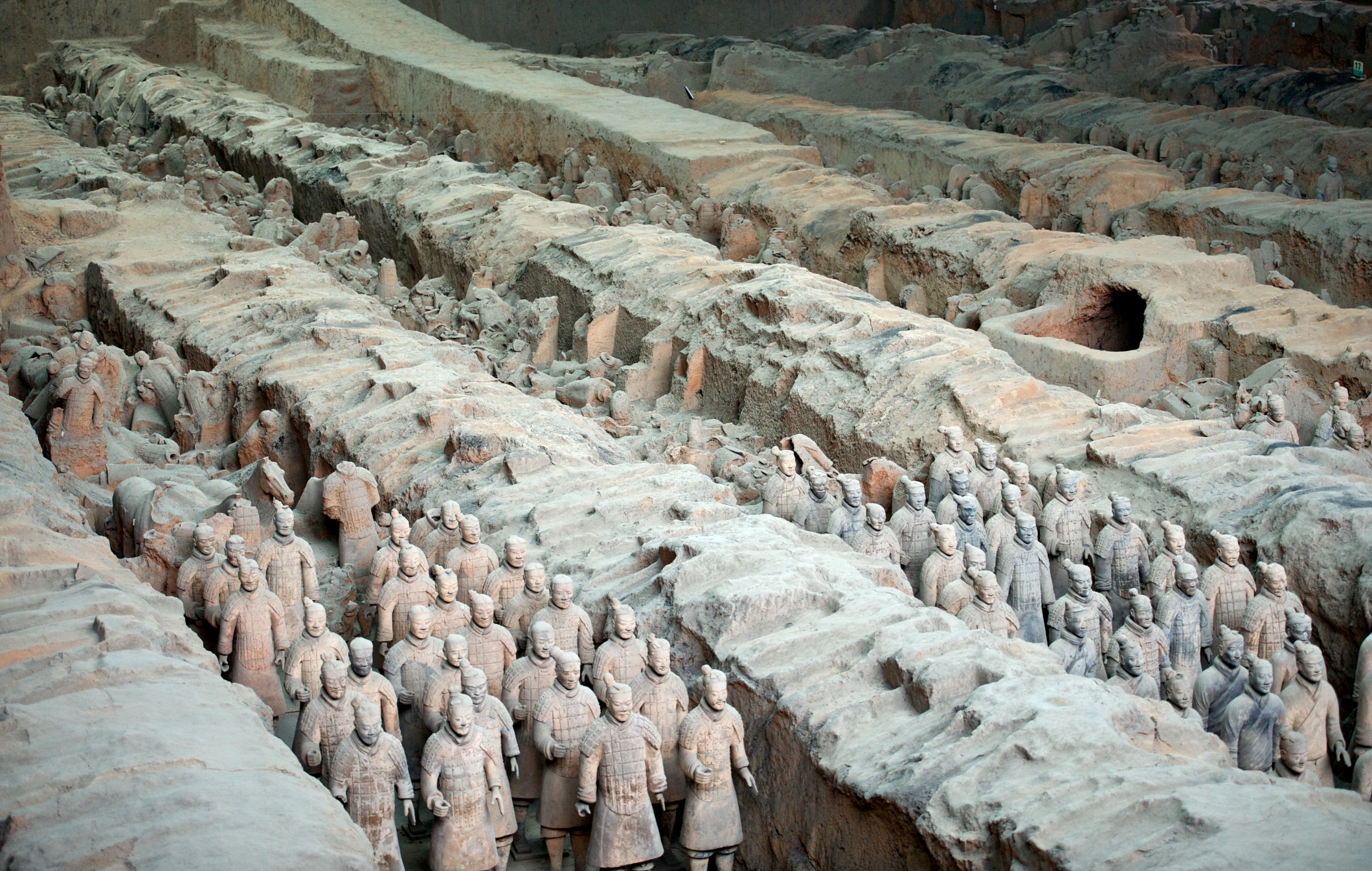

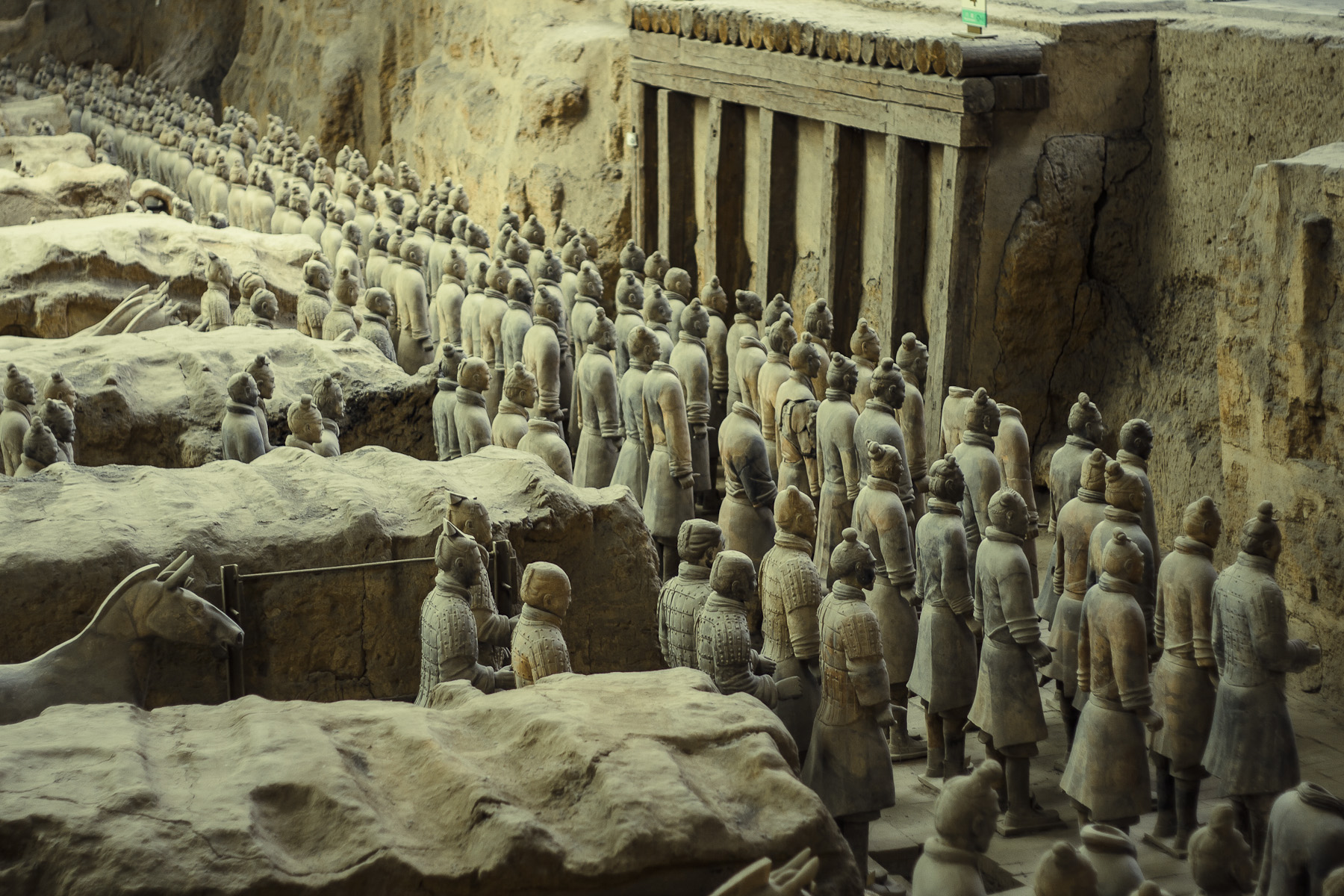

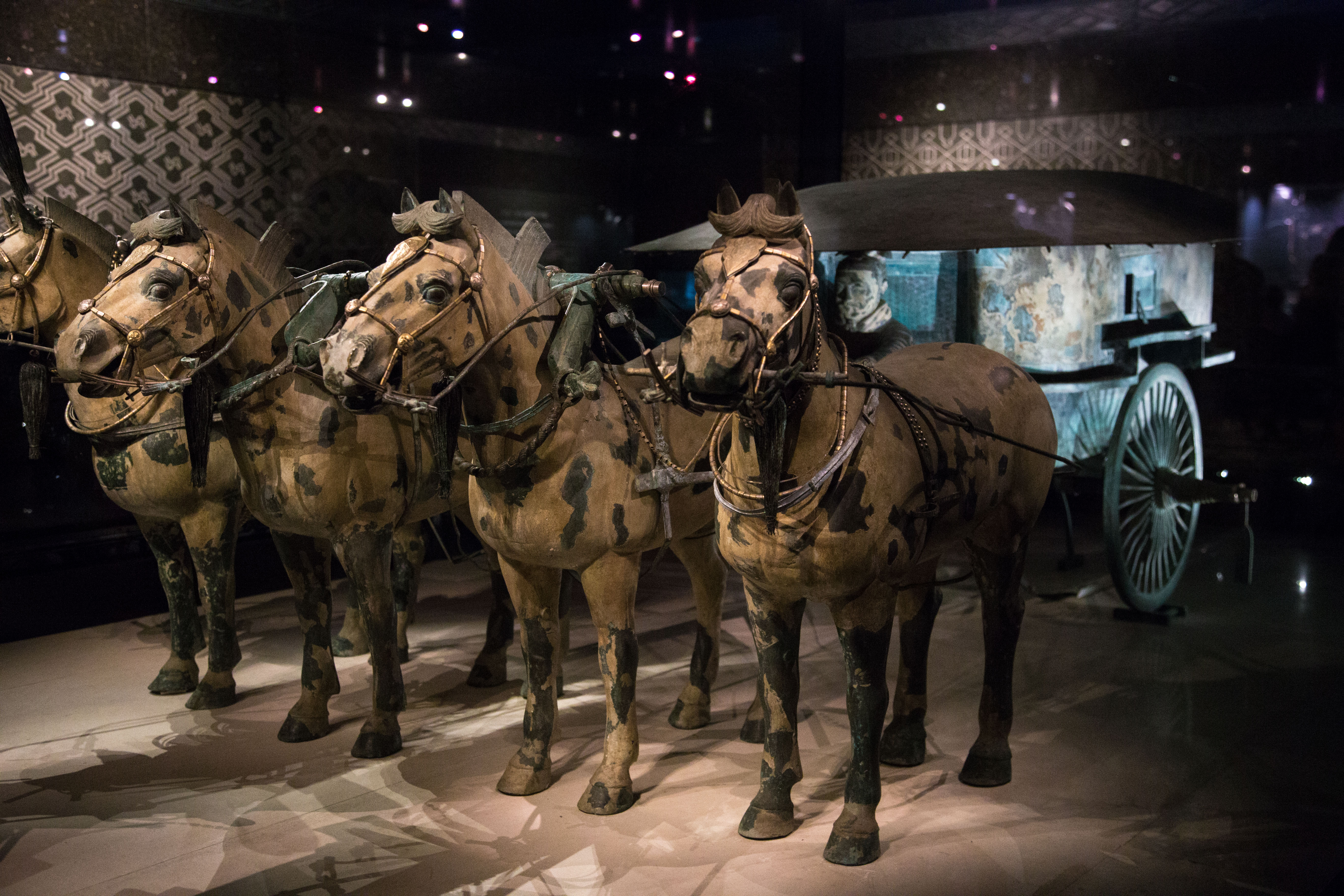

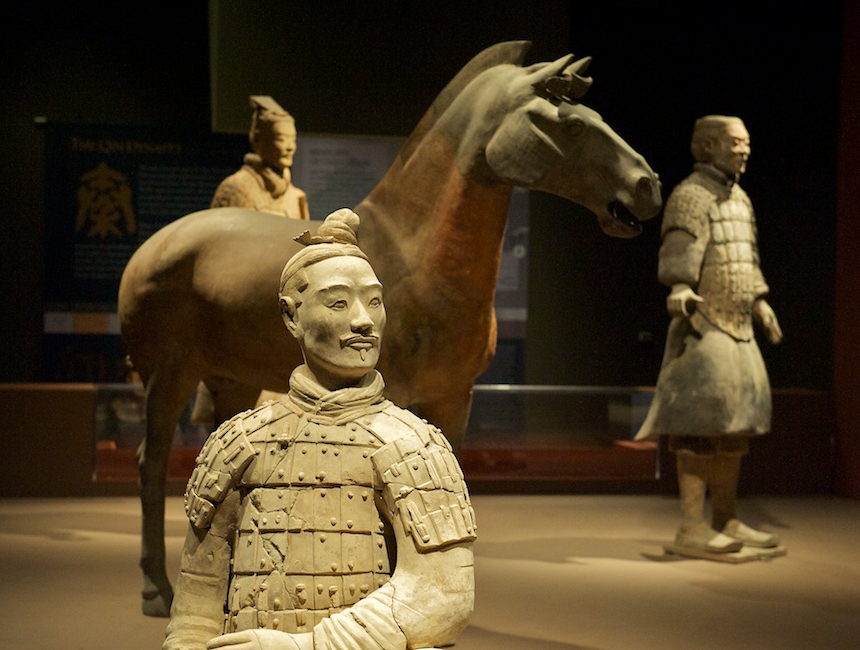

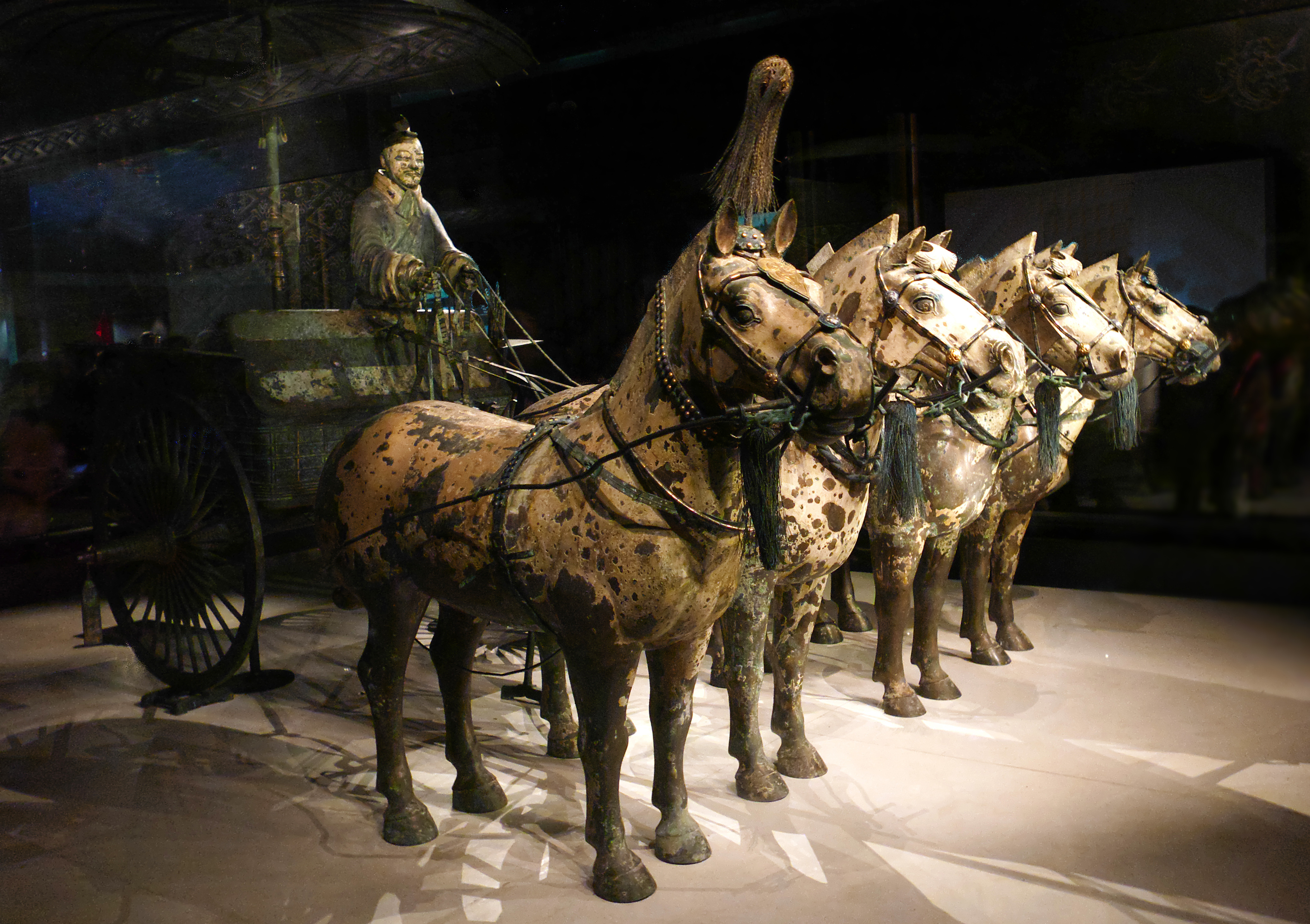
Chariot from the Museum of the Grave of Qin Shi Huang

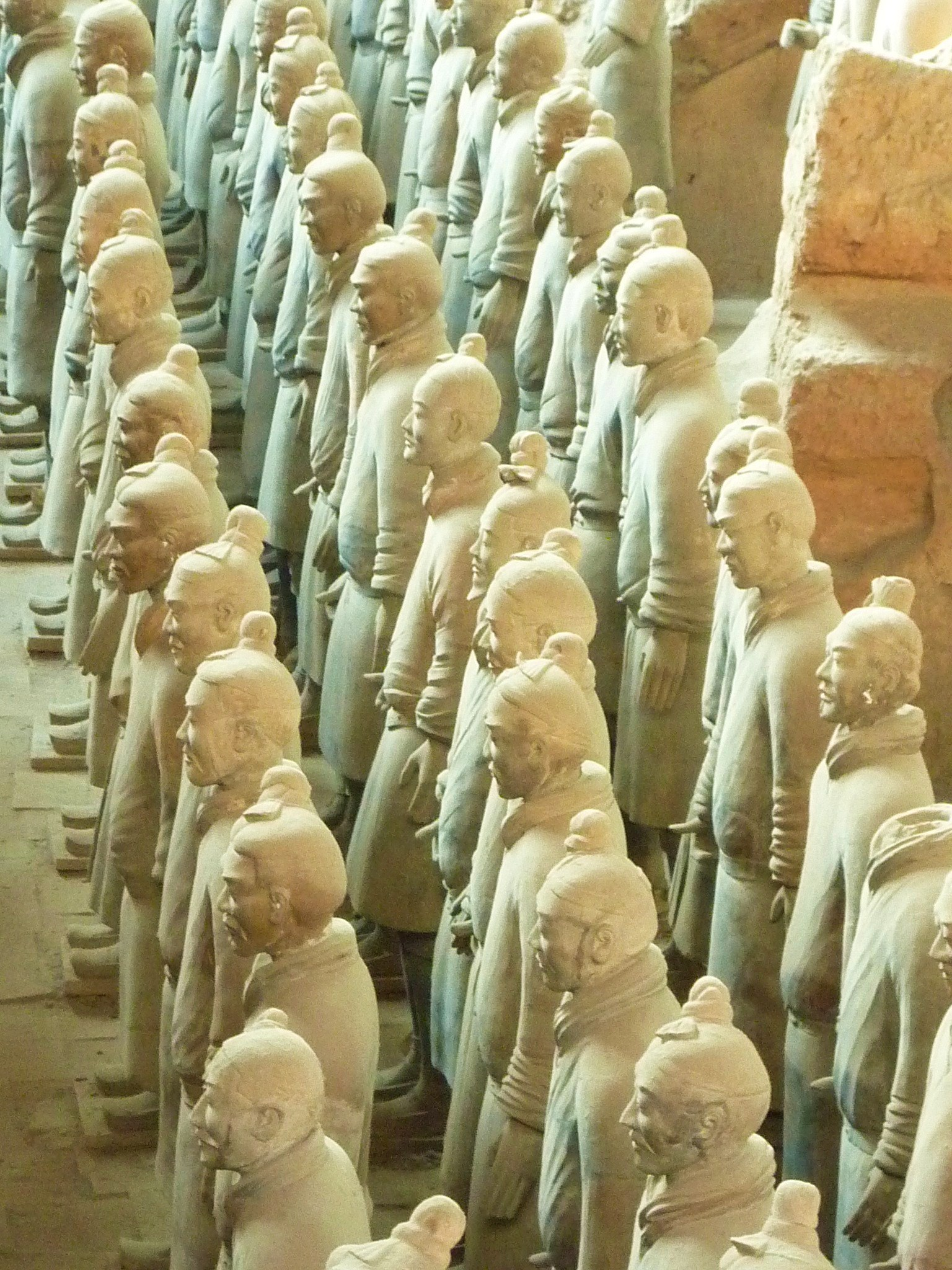

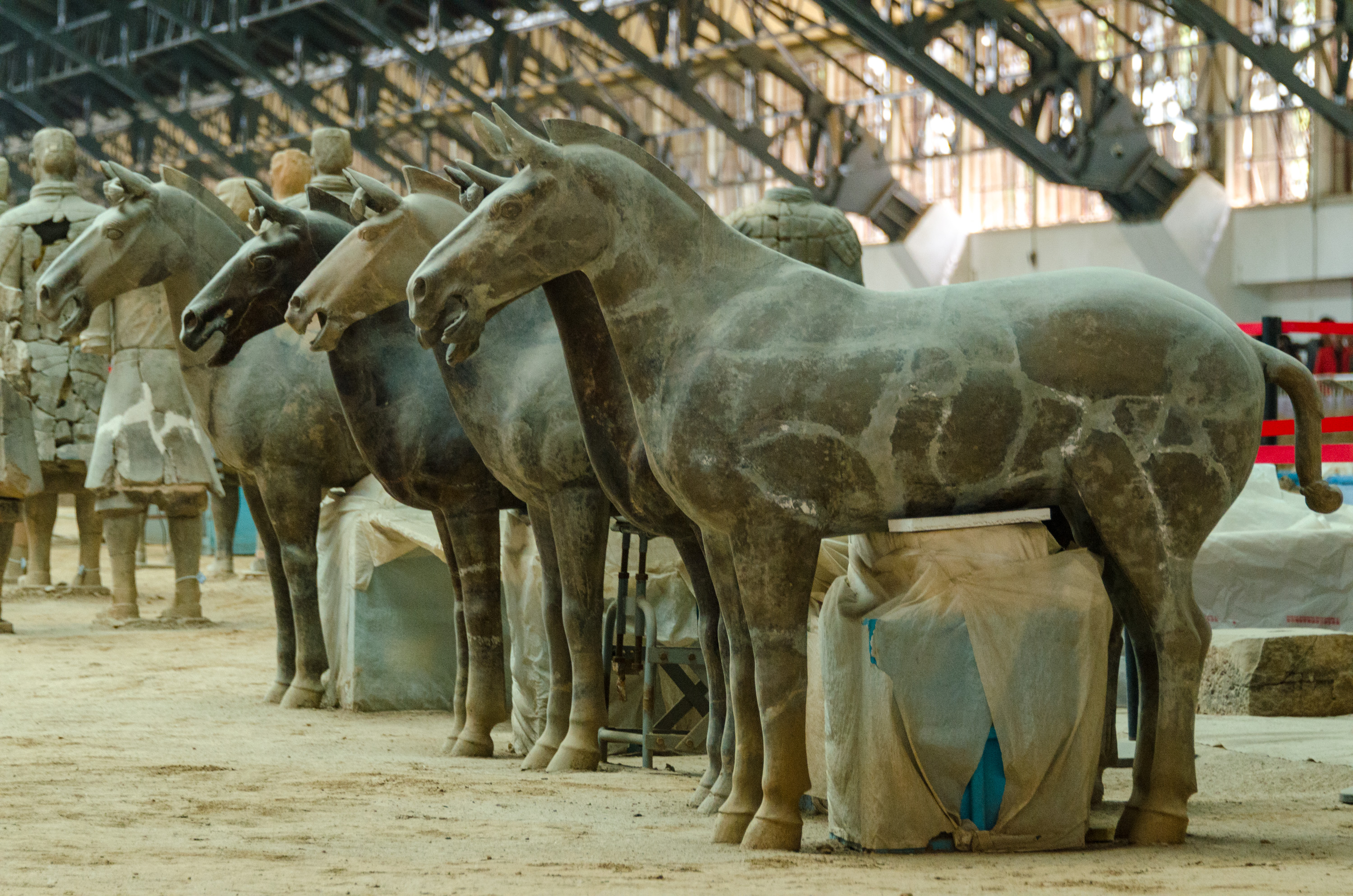

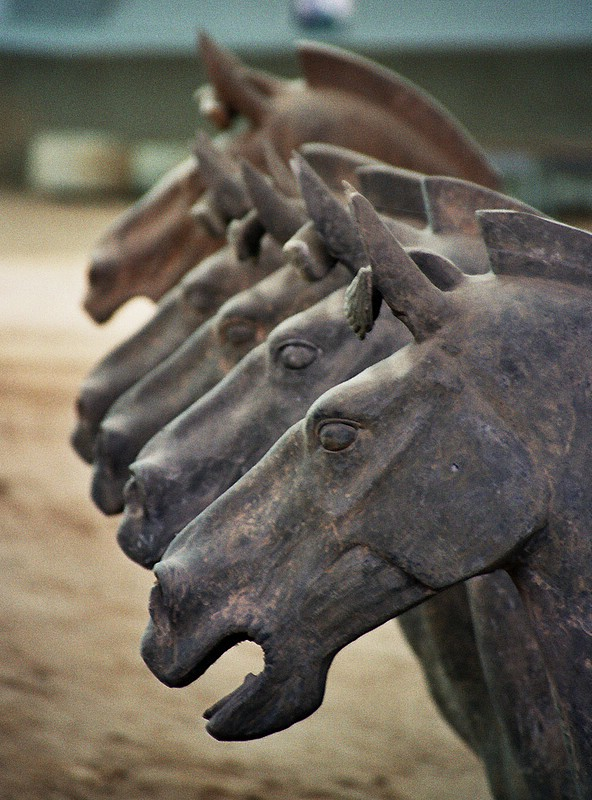

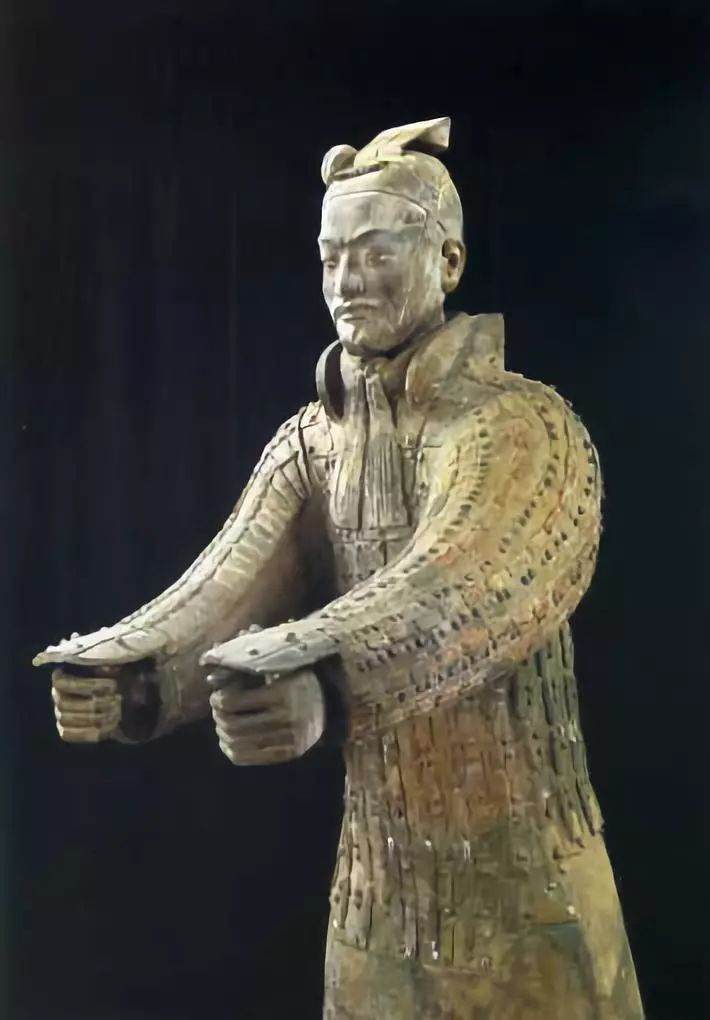

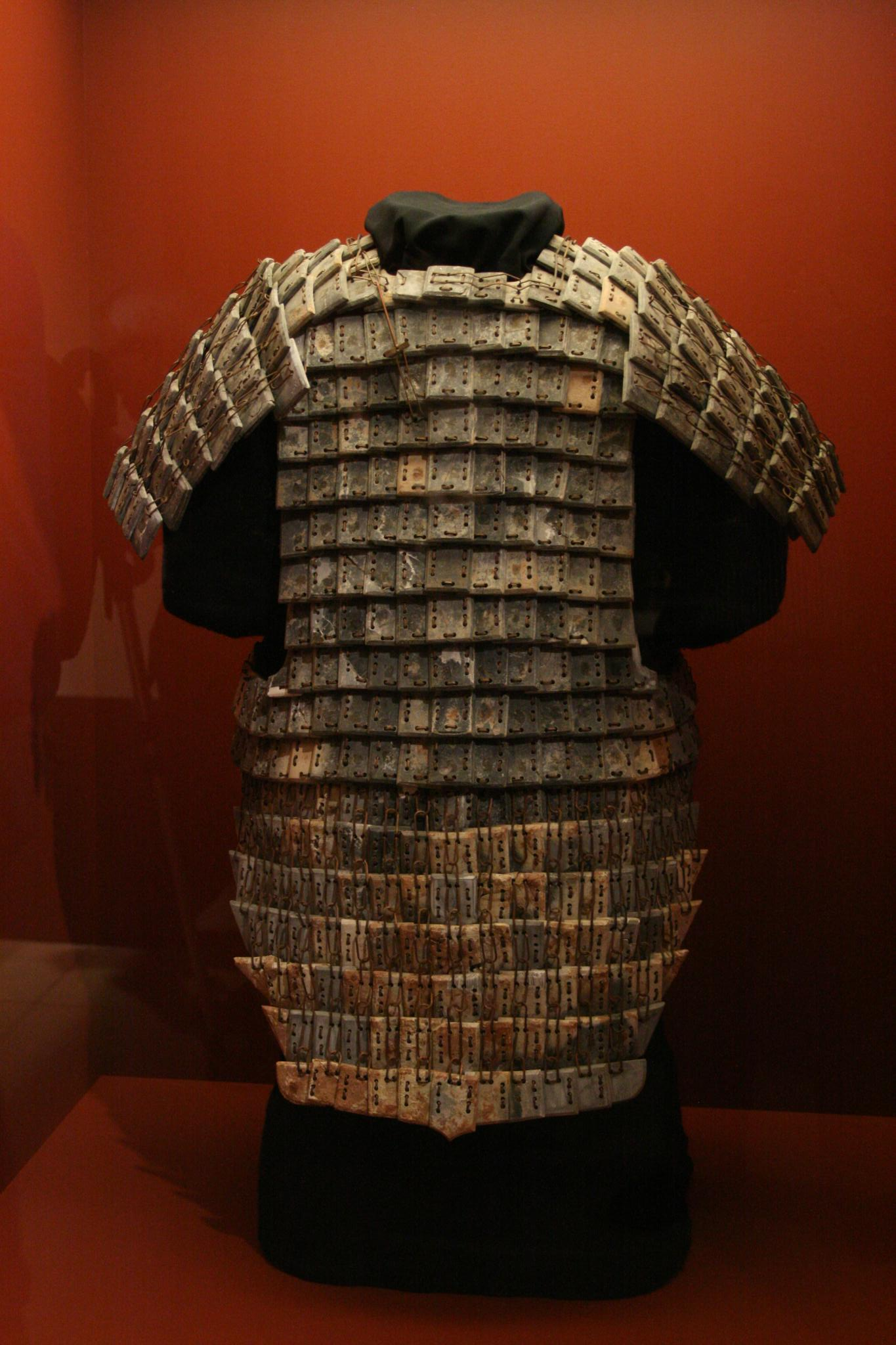
A suit of armor unearthed from the site

== See also ==
- List of World Heritage Sites in China
- Qin bronze chariot

== Bibliography ==
- Clements, Jonathan (2007). The First Emperor of China. Stroud: Sutton. ISBN 978-0-7509-3960-7.
- Debaine-Francfort, Corinne (1999). The Search for Ancient China. 'New Horizons' series. London: Thames & Hudson. ISBN 978-0-500-30095-4.
- Dillon, Michael (1998). China: A Historical and Cultural Dictionary. Durham East Asia series. Richmond, Surrey: Curzon. ISBN 978-0-7007-0439-2.
- Portal, Jane (2007). The First Emperor: China's Terracotta Army. Cambridge: Harvard University Press. ISBN 978-0-674-02697-1.
- Ledderose, Lothar (2000). "A Magic Army for the Emperor". Ten Thousand Things: Module and Mass Production in Chinese Art. The A.W. Mellon Lectures in the Fine Arts. Princeton, New Jersey: Princeton University Press. ISBN 978-0-691-00957-5. Archived from the original on 10 November 2013.
- Perkins, Dorothy (2000). Encyclopedia of China: The Essential Reference to China, Its History and Culture. New York: Facts On File. ISBN 978-0-8160-4374-3.
