= Twelve Metal Colossi =

Lost Chinese statues from the Qin Dynasty

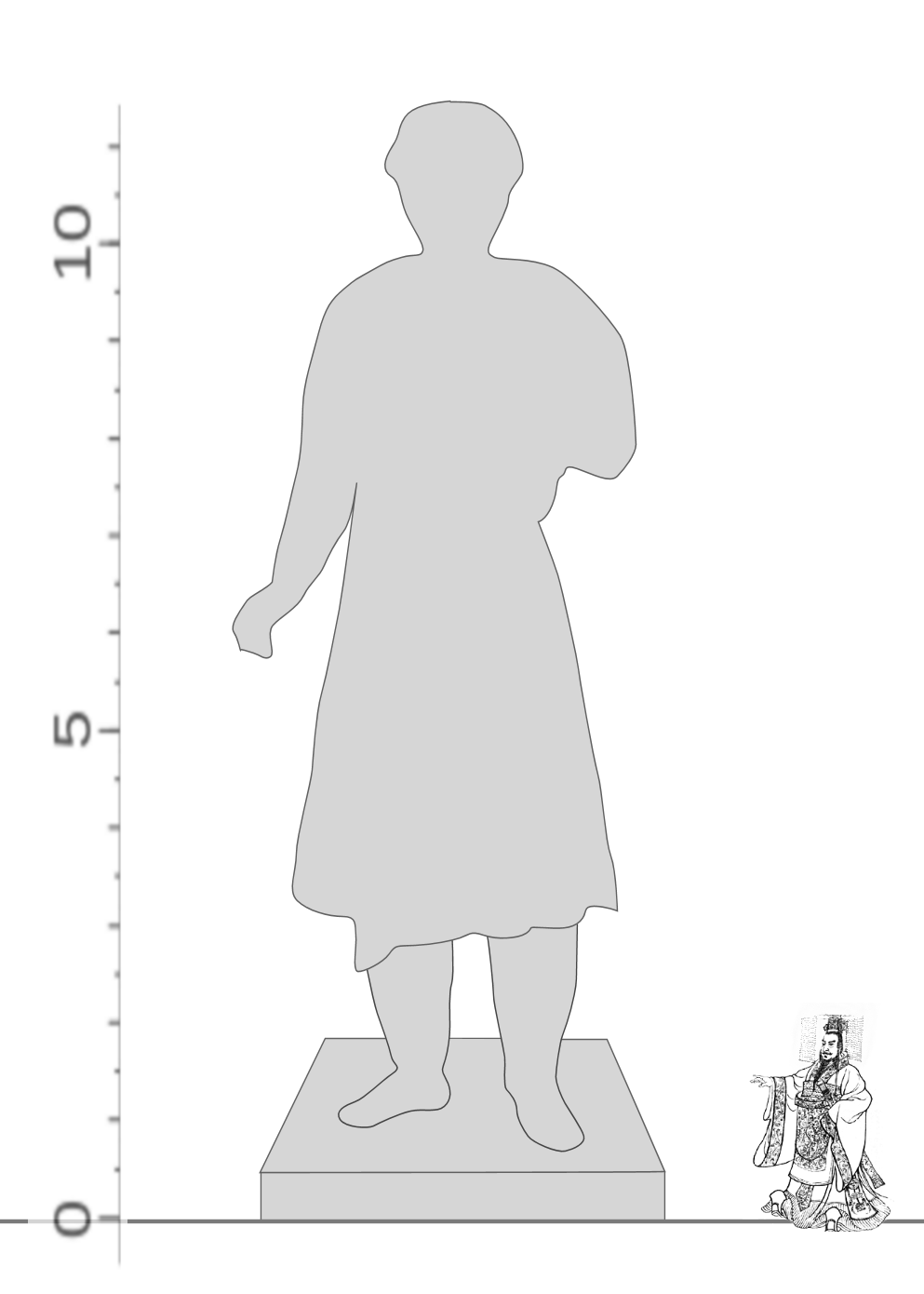
- Size of the colossi: according to Chinese accounts, the colossi were 11.5 meters high, and each statue weighed about 30 to 60 tons.
- Material: Bronze
- Size: 11.5 m high, 30-60 tons each.
- Created: Xianyang, Qin China, end of 3rd century BCE
- Present location: Lost (melted), 2nd and 4th century CE
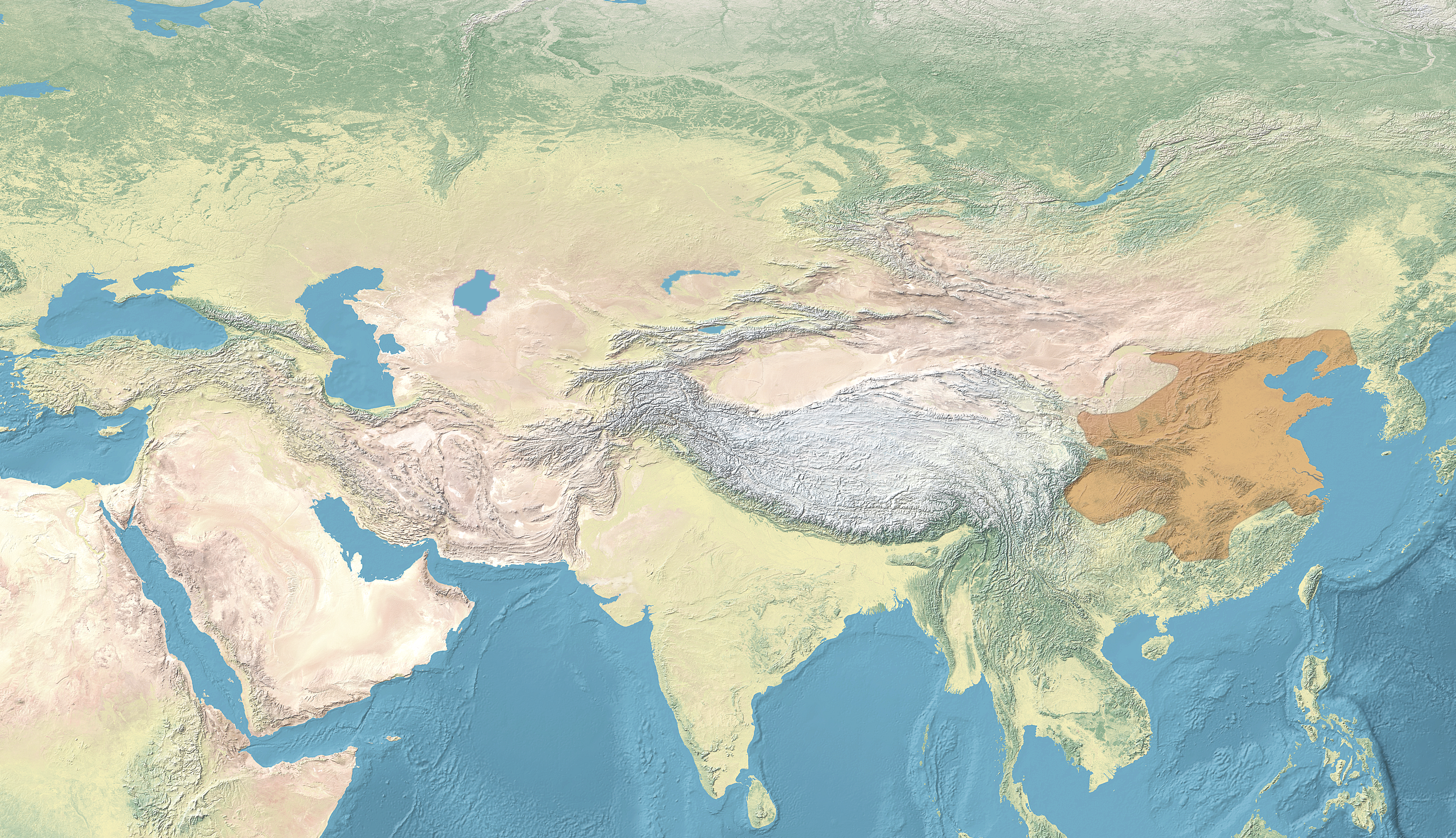
- Continental Asia with main polities in 221 BCE when Emperor Qin discovered the "great men", and locations of Lintao and Xianyang near Xi'an

The Twelve Metal Colossi (Chinese: 十二金人) were twelve bronze monumental statues cast after 221 BCE in the Qin dynasty by the order of Qin Shi Huang, the first Emperor of China. After defeating the other six Warring States during Qin's wars of unification, Qin Shi Huang had their bronze weapons collected and melted them down to be recast as bells and statues. Particularly noteworthy among them were twelve human statues, each said to have weighed a thousand dan [about 30 tons]. The Emperor displayed them in the palace. Sima Qian considered the casting of these monumental statues as one of the great achievements of the Emperor, on a par with the "unification of the law, weights and measurements, standardization of the axle width of carriages, and standardization of the writing system". The last of the statues were destroyed in the 4th century CE. No illustrations have survived.

== Chinese historical records ==
Early Chinese historical records, by Sima Qian (146-86 BCE) in the Shiji and Liu An (179-122 BCE) in the Huainanzi, mention that the Qin Emperor built the twelve monumental bronze statues for his Epang Palace. These bronze statues remained very famous in ancient China and were the object of numerous descriptions and commentaries, until they were lost around the 4th century CE.

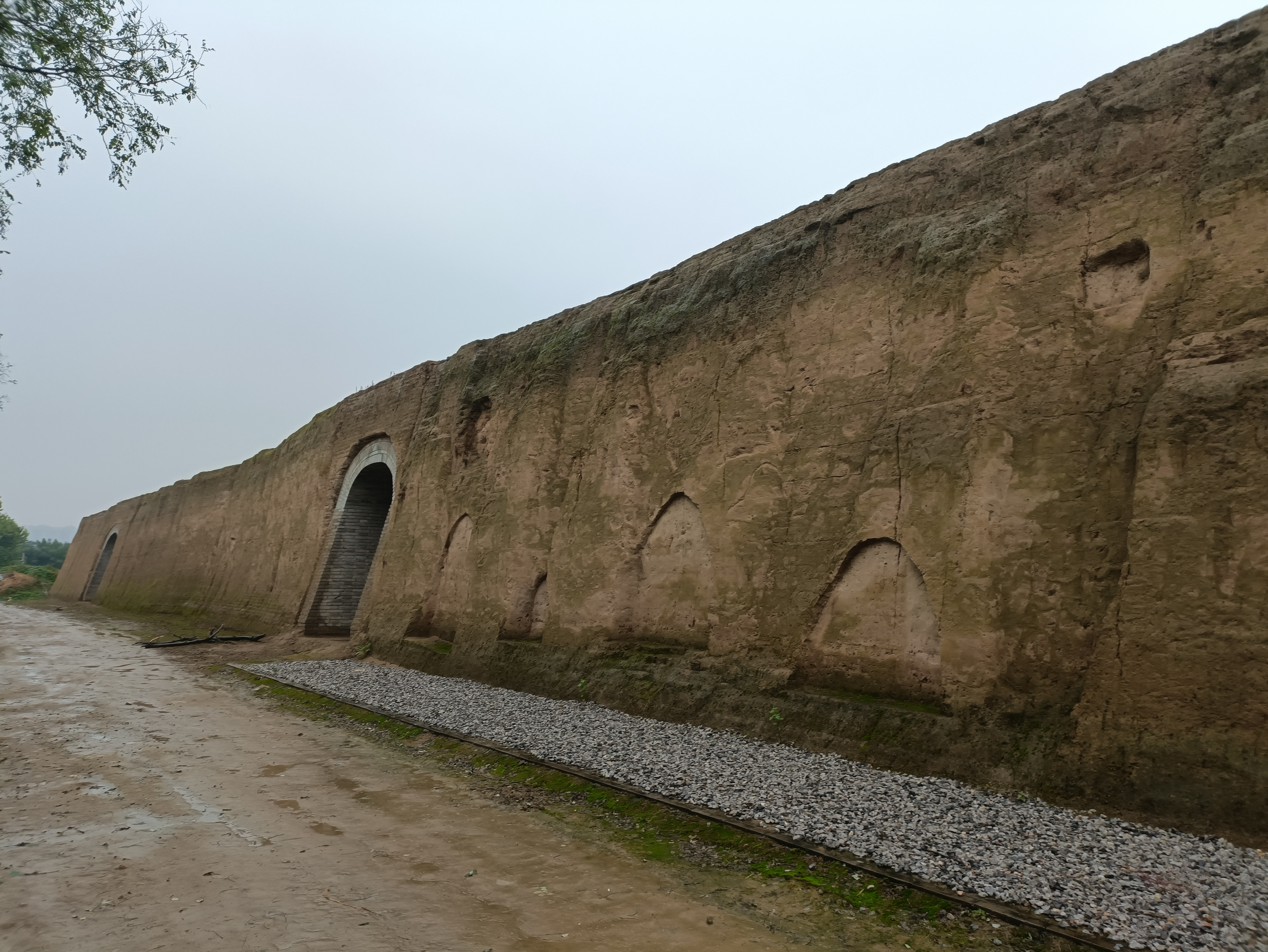
The Twelve Metal Colossi are said to have adorned the Imperial Palace of Qin Shihuang in Xi'an (remains of the western wall).

In his report, Sima Qian (c.145–86 BCE) explains that the First Emperor made 12 monumental bronze statues as one of the major endeavours of his reign:

收天下兵, 聚之咸陽, 銷以為鍾鐻金人十二, 重各千石, 置廷宮中. 一法度衡石丈尺. 車同軌. 書同文字.
He collected the weapons of All-Under-Heaven in Xianyang, and cast them into twelve bronze figures of the type of bell stands, each 1000 dan [about 30 tons] in weight, and displayed them in the palace. He unified the law, weights and measurements, standardized the axle width of carriages, and standardized the writing system.

— Shiji by the historian Sima Qian (c. 145–86 BCE), after Liu An in the Huainanzi circa 139 BCE.

An alternative reading of the passage describes the twelve statues supporting bells: "...all the weapons in the country...were melted down to make Twelve Golden Men as supports of bells". However it is possible that by the 3rd century BCE, the term zhongju tongren and zhongju jinren, both originally meaning "bell-supporting bronze figures", had become a standard term for human-shaped bronze statues. Several Han dynasty texts use zhongju as a synonym for "bronze figures" while others omitted it. In another part of his account Sima Qian writes "He melted down the weapons and cast ju [posts], in order to make 12 metal figures" (銷鋒鑄鐻, 以為金人十二), which tends to confirm that he made anthropomorphic "posts", comparable to the anthropomorphic posts of the bellstands of the Tomb of Marquis Yi of Zeng, but that bells were not otherwise involved.

The Twelve Metal Colossi were commented upon for several centuries, and relocated several times by the successive rulers of the country, first by the Han dynasty, which moved the statues to the Changle Palace, at the front of the Daxia Hall. The Eastern Han tyrant Dong Zhuo (d. 192 CE) melted 10 of the statues to mint new coinage to finance a personal castle in Mei County near Chang'an. This new bronze cash devalued rapidly because the new coins did not weigh the same, had no defined edge, and had no statement of their value on the coin surface.

The two remaining statues were moved to the Qingming Gate on the east side of Xi'an. Emperor Cao Rui (r.226–239 CE) of the Wei dynasty tried to move them to his capital of Luoyang, but had to abandon east of Xi'an at Bacheng because of their enormous weight. Later, Emperor Shi Hu (295–349 CE) of the Later Zhao dynasty moved the statues to his capital of Ye, 500 km northeast of Xi'an.

Finally Fu Jian (r.337–385 CE), Emperor Xuanzhao of the Former Qin dynasty, moved the two statues back to Xi'an and melted them down. No illustration of the statues has remained.

== Later treatises and their commentaries ==
In the 1st century CE, Ban Gu (32–92 CE) in his moralistic Treatise on the Five Elements of the Hanshu, explained that if rulers did not behave properly and governed inadequately, then humans would be plagued by scourges and deformities. As an example of such calamity, he explained that in the 26th Year of the Emperor (221 BCE) twelve giant humans in foreign clothes had arrived from the west at the frontier town of Lintao. According to Ban Gu, the Qin emperor took their visit as a favorable omen of his military victories, and decided to model the twelve statues after their likeness. Ban Gu lived in the capital Xianyang when the twelve statues were still extant in the Changle Palace, and his account does provide crucial additional details about the appearance of the twelve colossi, revealing that they represented individuals in foreign (夷狄, "Barbarian") clothes, from the western frontier of the Empire:

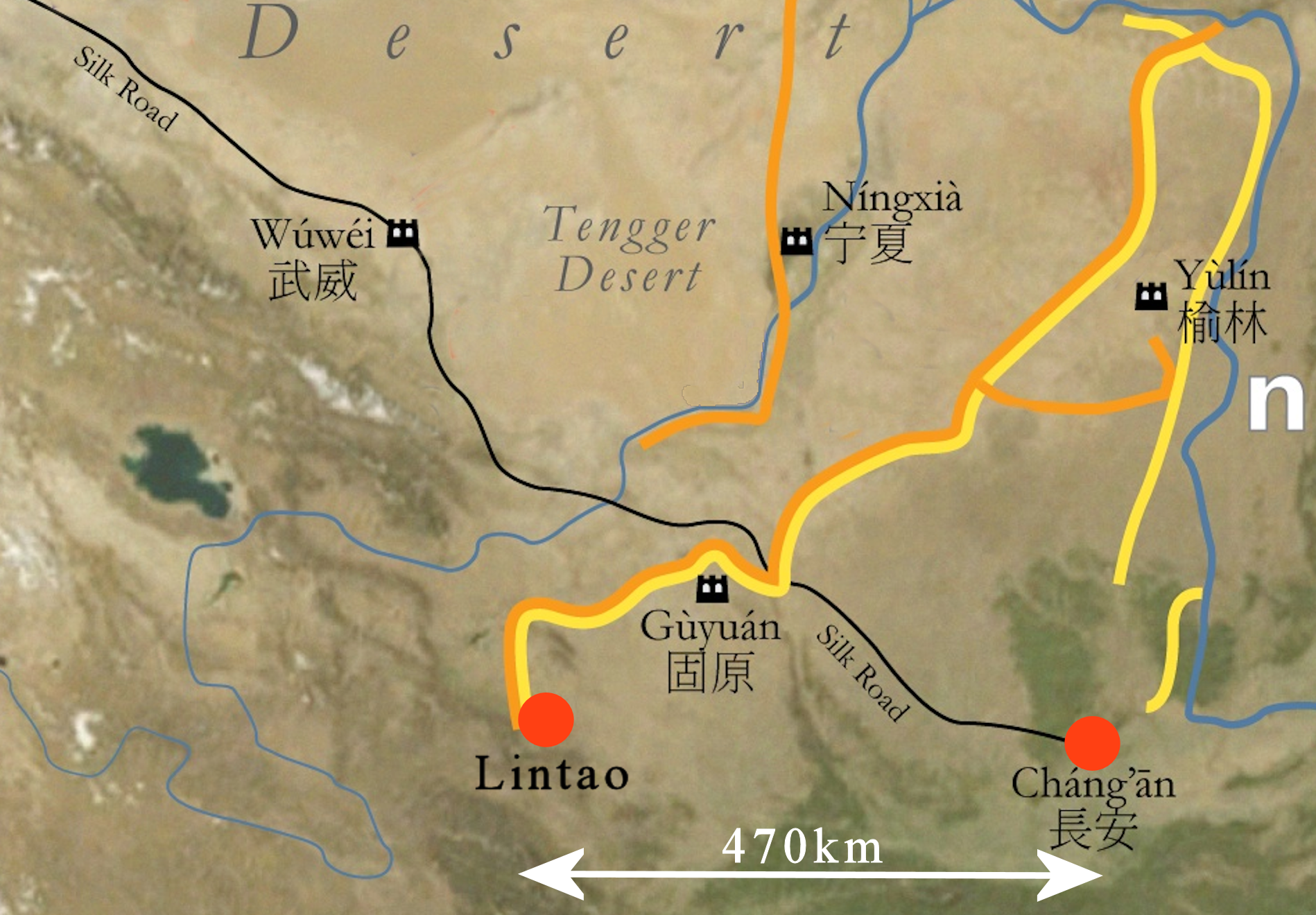
Lintao is about 470km from the capital (Chang'an), at the starting point of the Great Wall of China.

史記秦始皇帝二十六年, 有大人長五丈, 足履六尺, 皆夷狄服,凡十二人,見于臨洮. 天戒若曰, 勿大為夷狄之行, 將受其禍. 是歲始皇初并六國, 反喜以為瑞, 銷天下兵器, 作金人十二以象之.
In the 26th Year of the Emperor (221 BC) giants appeared that were 5 zhang tall and had feet of a size of 6 chi, all dressed in foreign (yidi 夷狄) robes. There were 12 of them and they appeared in Lintao. A heavenly taboo once said that he who recklessly follows foreign models will encounter disaster. In the same year, however, the Emperor succeeded in subjecting the six states, so he reinterpreted the appearance as an auspicious sign. Therefore, he melted down the weapons of all-under-heaven and cast the twelve bronze men to represent those [the "giants" from Lintao].

— Ban Gu (32–92 CE), Hanshu.

A 3rd-century commentary of the Hanshu, explained that these statues were inscribed with the following inscription:

其铭曰: 「皇帝二十六年, 初兼天下, 改諸侯為郡縣, 一 法律, 同度量.大人來見臨洮, 其長五丈, 足跡六尺.」
The inscription said: "In the 26th Year of the Emperor, when he first brought together all-under-heaven, divided the principalities into provinces and districts, and unified the weights and measures, [these] giants appeared in Lintao [the Far West]. They were 5 zhang [11.5 meters] high and had feet 6 chi [1.38 meters] long."

— Yan Shigu (581–645 AD), quoting the Sanfu huangtu 三輔黃圖 ("Yellow Plans of the Metropolitan Area", possibly third century CE) in his commentary to the Hanshu.

The story of the monumental statues evolved over the centuries with some variations, Ban Gu recounting that the giants (or a single giant) were named "Wengzhong":

秦皇帝二十六年, 初兼天下, 有長人見於臨洮, 其高五丈, 足迹六尺.放寫其形, 鑄金人以象之.翁仲君何是也.
In the 26th year of the reign of the Emperor of Qin [221 BCE], [when the emperor] had just brought together all-under-heaven, there were tall men appearing in Lintao. They were 5 zhang tall and had footprints the size of 6 chi. Imitating their images, the Golden Men [Metal Men] were cast to represent them. Wengzhong is what they were [called].

— Gao You (168–212), in his commentary to the Huainanzi.

Later Wengzhong was portrayed as a giant Chinese hero who went to fight against the Xiongnu at the border city of Lintao, and to whom the First Emperor built a monumental statue. Since then, "Wengzhong" statues have been set up to protect Chinese Imperial tombs, as in the Qianling Mausoleum (c. 700 CE), and the word itself has become a generic term for large scale statues of bronze and stone.

== Hellenistic hypotheses ==
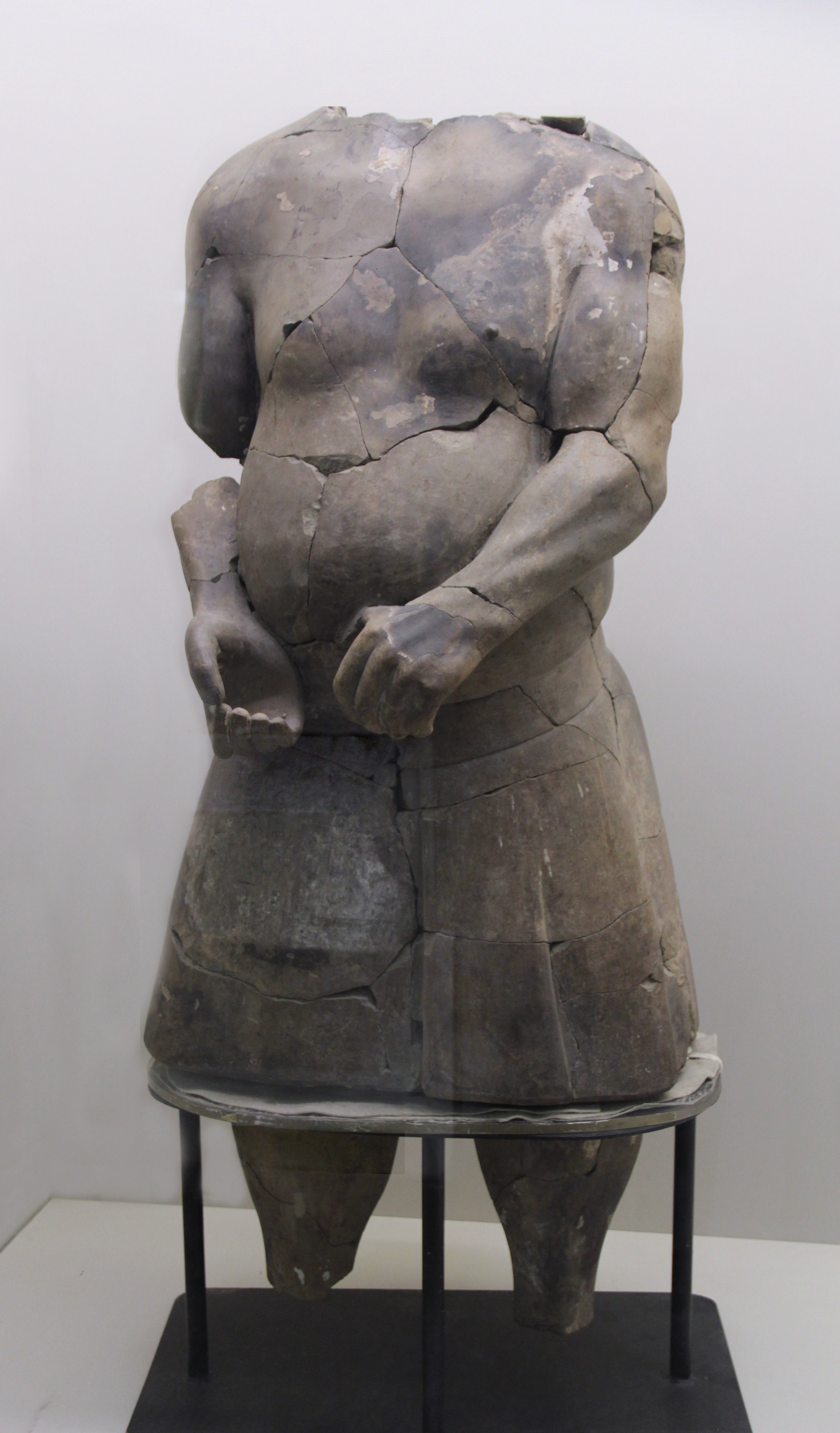
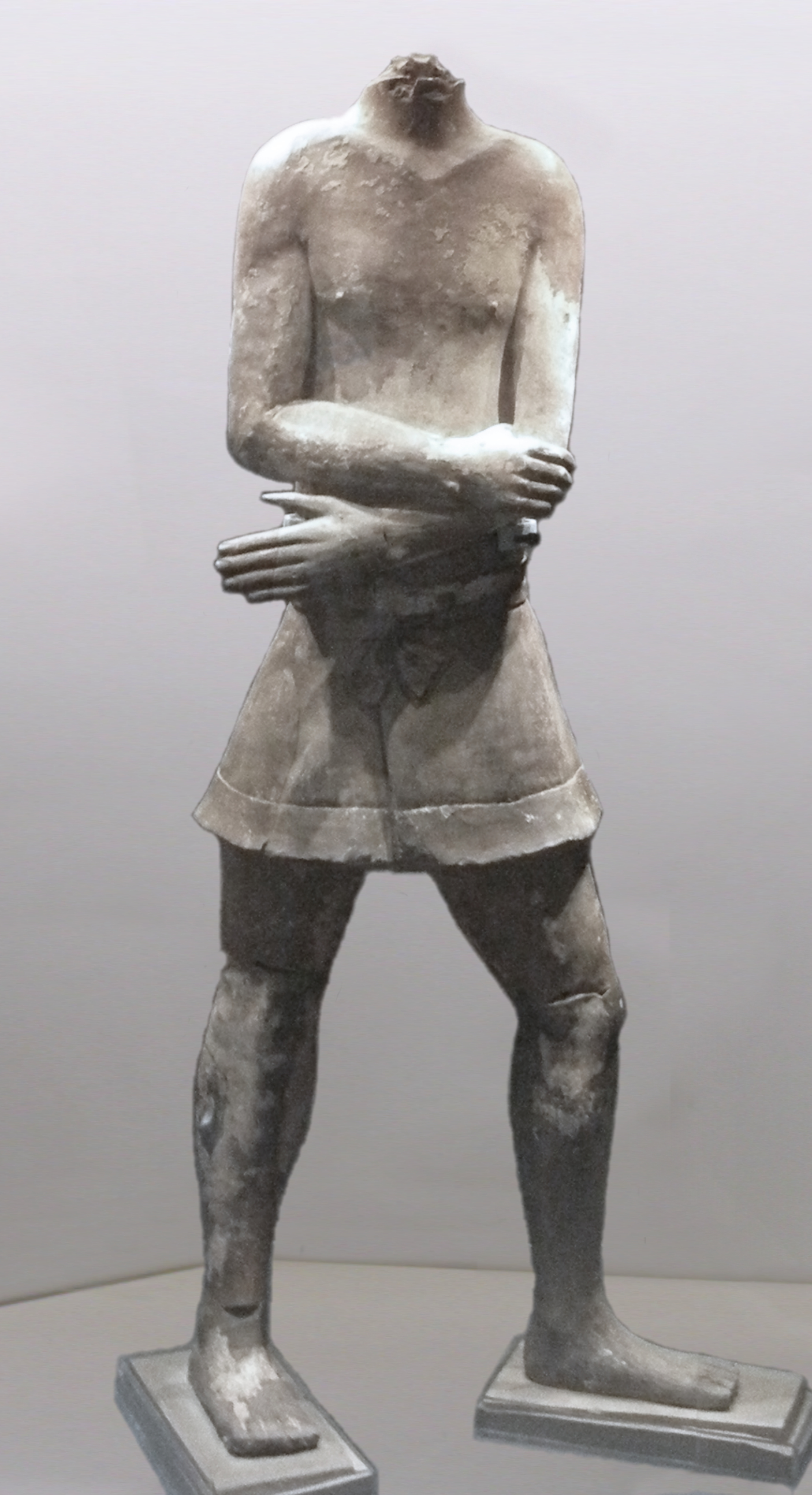
Two of the Acrobats, naturalistic terracotta statues ordered by the Qin Emperor for his mausoleum in 210 BCE

Due to the lack of direct evidence on their precise form, scholars have focused on "possible origins or inspirations of such giant statues, which were absent in pre-Qin China." Later, over the 600 years until their final destruction, numerous stories circulated about the subject of these monumental statues, some involving giant barbarians from the West, others involving the Qin giant hero Wengzhong, but a definite answer remains elusive in the absence of direct proof.

Lukas Nickel, Professor at SOAS, suggests that the monumental statues of Qin Shihuang represented 12 foreigners of large stature or "giants" (大人 daren) encountered at the western end of the country, in Lintao, Gansu, and that they might not have been giants but large statues of the twelve Olympian gods. Duan Qingbo, Chief Archaeologist and Director of excavations at the Mausoleum of the First Qin Emperor from 1998 to 2006, believes that the twelve "men of great stature" were unlikely to be East Asian and were possibly subjects of the Macedonian empire, such as the Greco-Bactrians (250-100 BCE). Although there is "no data... that can prove there was any direct contact between Eastern civilization and either Greek or Persian civilization" or "any concrete proof that the 'men of great stature'... were either Persians or Greeks", Duan believes that the exaggerated height of the giants was due to their non-East-Asian appearance. He thinks that this group of people may have been Greeks or Persians who reached the Qin and transmitted institutional culture and material technologies that were put into practice by the Qin emperor.

The Qin Emperor would thus have received from western regions a major impulse for the creation of monumental statuary, which would naturally have influenced as well the creation of the monumental statues in his mausoleum, namely the Terracotta Army. Up to his time, very few sculptures in human form had ever been created in China, and none were naturalistic. From the preceding Zhou dynasty period, only rare and very small figurines are known, such as the rather unnaturalistic Taerpo horserider, the first known representation of a cavalryman in China.

Coincidentally or not, the Greeks also had a practice of representing their twelve Olympian gods as sculpture in human form. Diodorus Siculus recounts how Alexander the Great, when he reached the easternmost point of his conquests in India about 325 BCE, established altars to the 12 Greek gods, his idea being to make "a camp of heroic proportions and then leave to the natives evidence of men of huge stature, displaying the strength of giants". Lukas believes the first Qin Emperor seems to have made monumental bronze statues on a western model for his palace, which provides an intriguing precedent for the Terracotta Army in his mausoleum. Highly realistic statues made by the Qin Emperor, such as the Acrobats, may have received Western influence through the intercultural exchange involved in the design of the Twelve Metal Colossi.

=== Criticism of the "Lintao statues" hypothesis ===
Frederick Shih-chung Chen disputes the analysis according to which great Hellenistic statues were discovered in Lintao. Chen does not dispute the possibility of Hellenistic influence on the Terracotta Army per se but Nickel's interpretation of the twelve daren that appeared in Lintao as Hellenistic statues. According to Chen, the twelve Big Men (大人 daren) were not statues but exceptionally tall visitors and an "omen related to human illness manifested in physical abnormality." The account of the twelve Big Men appears in the "Treatise on the Five Elements" (五行志 Wuxing zhi) in the Hanshu and was narrated as part of several physical abnormalities that portend imminent calamity caused by the usurpation of the ruler by their subjects. The twelve Big Men appeared alongside "three tall foreign brothers, a woman turning into a man, a man turning into a woman and giving birth to a child, a lady returning from the dead, a child being born with two heads and four arms, an old man with horns growing on his head, and so on." In this context, the term daren likely referred to an abnormal human physical condition rather than sculptures. These physical abnormalities were preceded by disasters accompanied by abnormalities in horses. This sequence of omens is illustrated in the "Commentary on the Five Elements in the Great Plan" (洪範五行傳 Hongfan wuxing zhuan): goblins that attack by shooting, plagues of dragons and snakes, disasters involving horses, human illnesses manifested in inferiors encroaching upon superiors, and "irregularities in the paths of the sun and the moon, and retrograde movements of planets and constellations." These omens occur when the ruler fails to live up to the six moral criteria of a ruler. Chen has difficulty understanding why these twelve Big Men would have appeared among the list of abnormalities and human illnesses if they had been sculptures, as Nickel suggests.

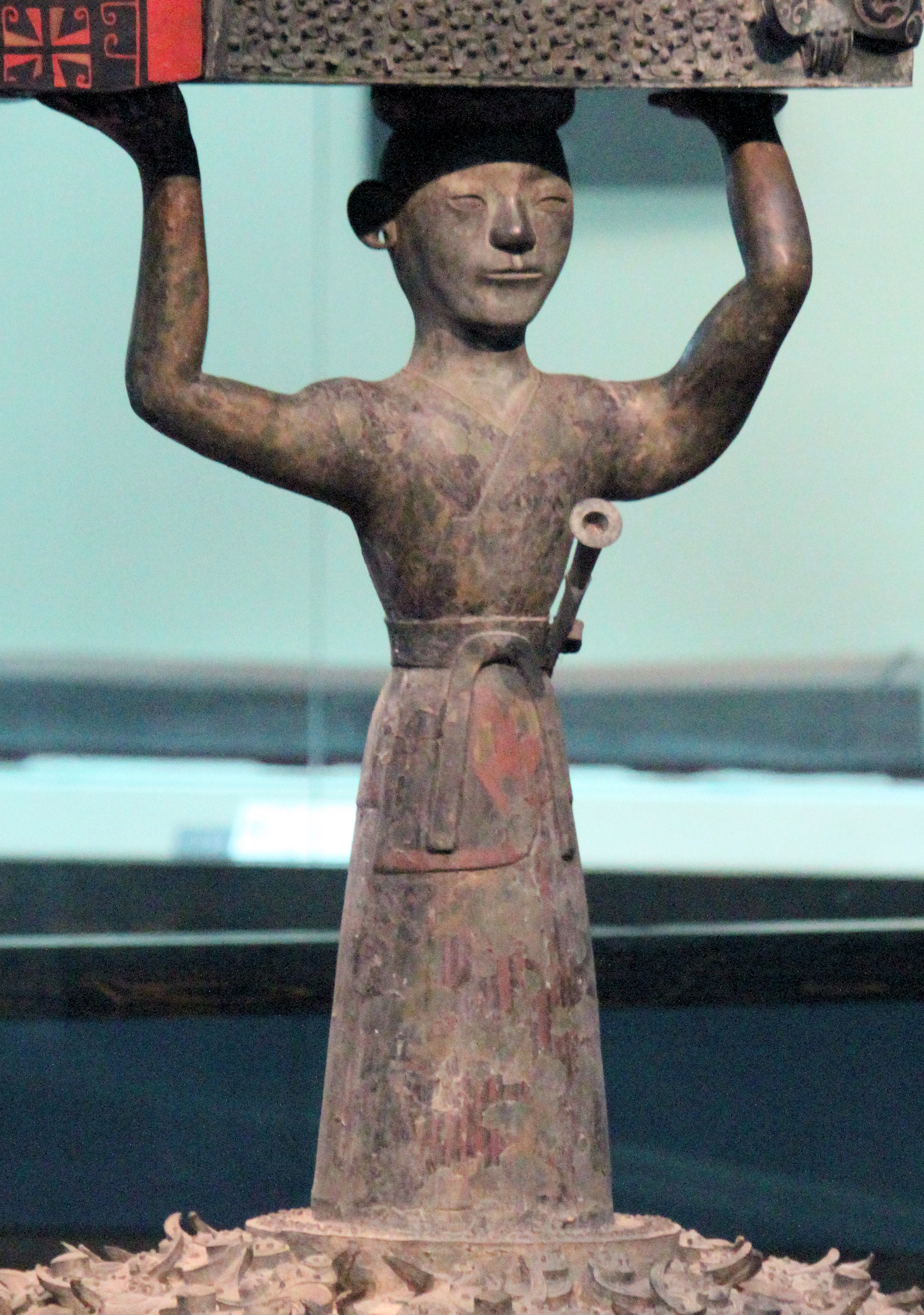
Naturalistic caryatids upholding bells from the Tomb of Marquis Yi of Zeng, about 80cm tall. 5th century BC. Suggested by some scholars to be predecessors of the Twelve Golden Men.

Chen points out that Nickel omitted part of the quotation in Gao You's commentary on the Huainanzi that he used as evidence that the First Emperor commissioned Golden Men sculptures that were inspired by the twelve Big Men. In the omitted section, the two characters referring to the Big Men are chang ren (長人), which means "tall men", and mentions the large footprints they left behind, in accordance with the omens of the "Treatise on the Five Elements". There is also no linguistic precedence for da ren (大人) denoting statues in ancient Chinese texts while the Treatise makes clear that they referred to exceptionally tall visitors that represented an omen of human illness. The place they appeared in, Lintao, had been under effective Qin administration since before the First Emperor's reign, and it would have been unlikely for twelve giant statues to be erected without the Qin state's prior knowledge.

Chen also questioned the connection between the twelve statues and the twelve Olympian gods. Lucas Christopoulo linked the Big Men to the Olympian gods based on a gilt-silver platter, found near Lintao, depicting the heads of the twelve Olympian gods surrounding Dionysus and a translation of the twelve daren in Lintao as twelve "chryselephantine statues". The platter's date of manufacture has been dated to no earlier than the 2nd or 3rd century CE, and probably did not enter China until the 7th or 8th century CE, while there are no credible sources to support the translation. Another issue is that half the Olympian gods are female. If the twelve Golden Men had been modeled after the Olympian gods, then surely the depiction of exotic females would have drawn the attention of historians, but no such description of female features exist.

=== Criticism of the Hellenistic hypothesis ===
Wu Hung describes six bronze sculptures found in the Tomb of Marquis Yi of Zeng, dated to the 5th century BC, as "naturalistic" and displaying an understanding of human anatomy. This led some scholars to identify them as possible predecessors to the Twelve Golden Men. Wu Hung says there may be some truth to this hypothesis, but notes that there is a temporal gap of 200 years between the Twelve Golden Men and the figures, which are "human-shaped components" (caryatids for bells) and fundamentally different works than free-standing sculptures. The lack of large free-standing sculptures led to Nickel's Hellenic hypothesis. Wu Hung believes Ban Gu and others' descriptions of the Twelve Golden Men lend support to the assumption that they were based on Hellenic statuary, but does not consider these records to be reliable historical information. He referred to descriptions of the Twelve Golden Men as ancient tales and Ban Gu's description to be a variation of a legend recorded by Sima Qian. Wu Hung concluded that to confirm any connection "between these vanished sculptural works and foreign models, we would need substantial new archaeological evidence".

== "Victory statues" hypotheses ==
The twelve colossi built by Qin Shihuang were imbued with a considerable political meaning: after unifying the country and bringing together the "Six countries", Qin Shihuang confiscated all bronze weapons and melted them to cast the statues, and installed the statues at his newly built personal palace. This can be considered as an important symbol of conquest, unification and peace. Howard suggested that the 12 monumental statues may have formed 6 pairs, each pair representing one of the conquered kingdoms. Wu Hung believes that the statues were meant to evoke the Nine Tripod Cauldrons created in Chinese antiquity. They were said to have been made of bronze collected from different regions and symbolized their assimilation into the Xia dynasty. The Nine Tripods were lost when the Qin emperor (then king of Qin) ordered for their transport to his capital, but the ship carrying them sank in the Si River. An attempted salvage mission by 1,000 men in 219 BCE failed.

== In popular culture ==
The Twelve Metal Colossi, as depicted in The First Emperor of China (1989). The monumental colossi are shown bordering the avenue leading to the main gate of the Palace.

The Twelve Metal Colossi have been depicted in numerous Chinese movie scenes, such as The First Emperor of China (1989). The monumental colossi are shown in two lines of six, bordering the avenue leading to the main gate of the Palace of the First Emperor, and dwarfing the multitude of visitors.

== See also ==
- Colossus of Rhodes

== Bibliography ==
- Chen, Frederick Shih-chung (2021), "Not That Kind of Big Men: A Response to Lukas Nickel's Interpretation of the Term da ren 大人 in Lintao 臨洮", Journal of the American Oriental Society
- Portal, Jane (2007). The First Emperor: China's Terracotta Army. Harvard University Press.
- Hung, Wu (2020), "Thinking Through Scale: The First Emperor's Sculptural Enterprise", Figurines: Figuration and the Sense of Scale, Oxford University Press, ISBN 978-0-19-886109-6
