= The Acrobats =

Chinese naturalistic statues of the 2nd century BCE

- 百戏俑
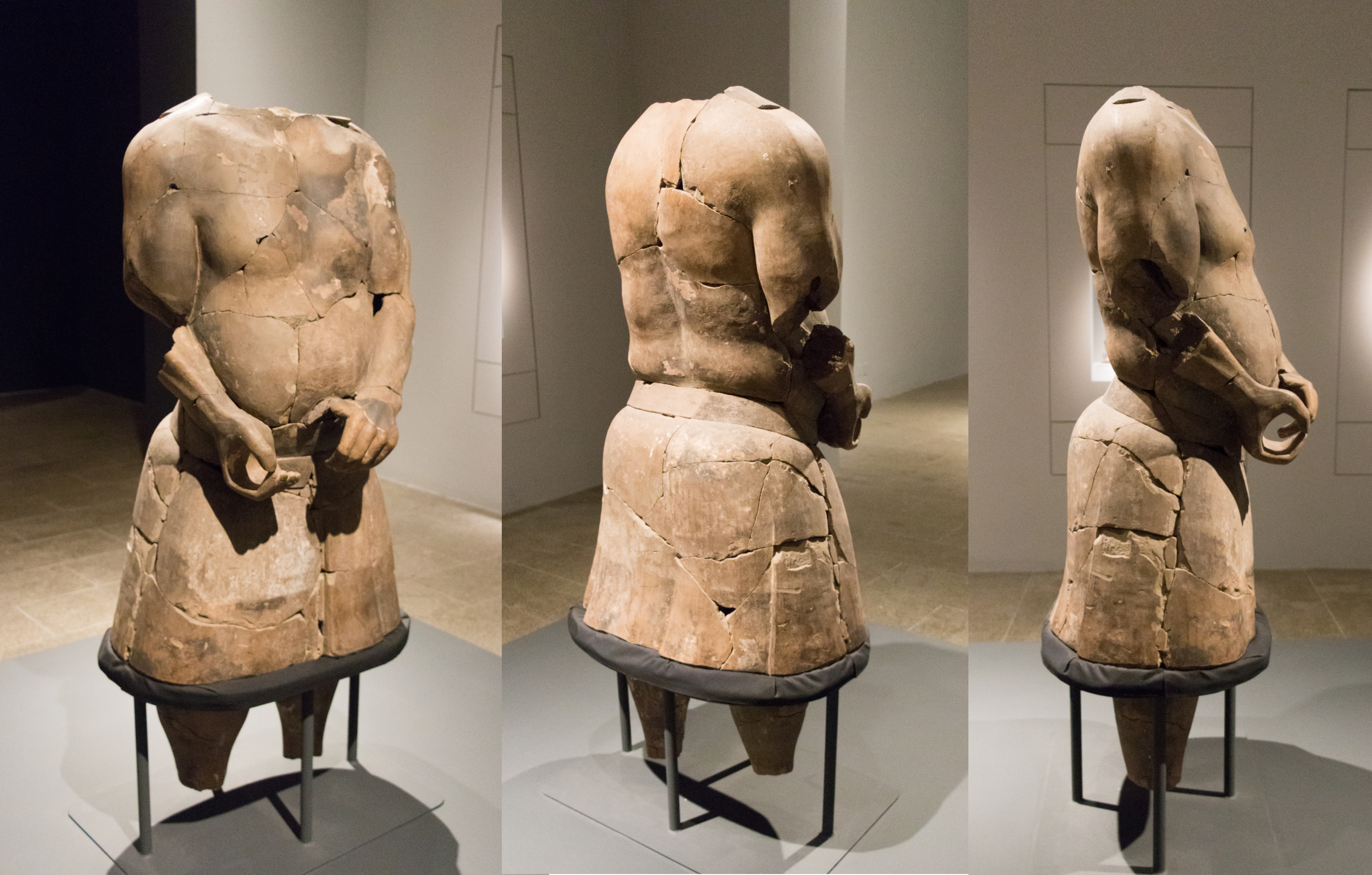
- "Strongman", from The Acrobats series, pit K9901. Mausoleum of the First Qin Emperor Qin Shihuang, 210 BCE.
- Material: Terracotta
- Size: c. 180 cm tall
- Created: 210 BCE
- Discovered: Mausoleum of the First Qin Emperor (Qin Shihuang)
- Present location: Museum of the Mausoleum of the First Qin Emperor

Location
- Excavation site of the Acrobats Xi'an (China)

The Acrobats (百戏俑) are a series of terracotta sculptures from pit K9901 of the Mausoleum of the First Qin Emperor Qin Shihuang (dated to 210-209 BCE). They are notable for their display of sculptural naturalism, and the artistic understanding of human anatomy that they represent. Particularly, they have been seen as artistically exceptional through their depiction of semi-nudity, which has amended a traditional view that only clothed figures were depicted in ancient Chinese sculpture of the period. The sculptures were uncovered in two series of excavations, the initial 1999 discovery and a second dig in June 2013.

Alongside these acrobat sculptures, figures which depict court officials and stablehand grooms have also been uncovered in pit K9901, with sculptures depicting other roles found in various other pits, such as court scribes (pit K0006) and musicians (pit K0007).

== Characteristics ==
The acrobats were discovered in 1999 inside a pit right inside of the Mausoleum walls.

The sculptures display an advanced understanding of human anatomy. Wheareas the anatomy of the terracotta warriors is rather uncertain under their bulky uniforms, the acrobats on the contrary display many details of human anatomy which had never been shown in Far Eastern art traditions: the proportions of the body are accurate, the musculature appears bulging under the skin, the ribs appear along the flanks and the emergence of the spinal vertebrae is precisely shaped in the back of the athletes. The kinetic laws of body movement are also mastered, as shown by the variable bulging of the belly in response to specific postures or movements.

The original function of these statues remains unclear, but they are described as either acrobats or dancers. Their number was relatively few compared to the warriors in uniform, probably about a few dozens. The figures are essentially naked, except for a loincloth. These figures are very vivid and less stereotypical than the soldiers Terracotta Army, especially through the dynamic treatment of the musculature and bone joints. Some of the men are very lean, while others have massive bodies. Several of them are shown in the process of moving or making gestures. These terracotta statues demonstrate an advanced mastery of the depiction of the shapes and proportions of the human body.

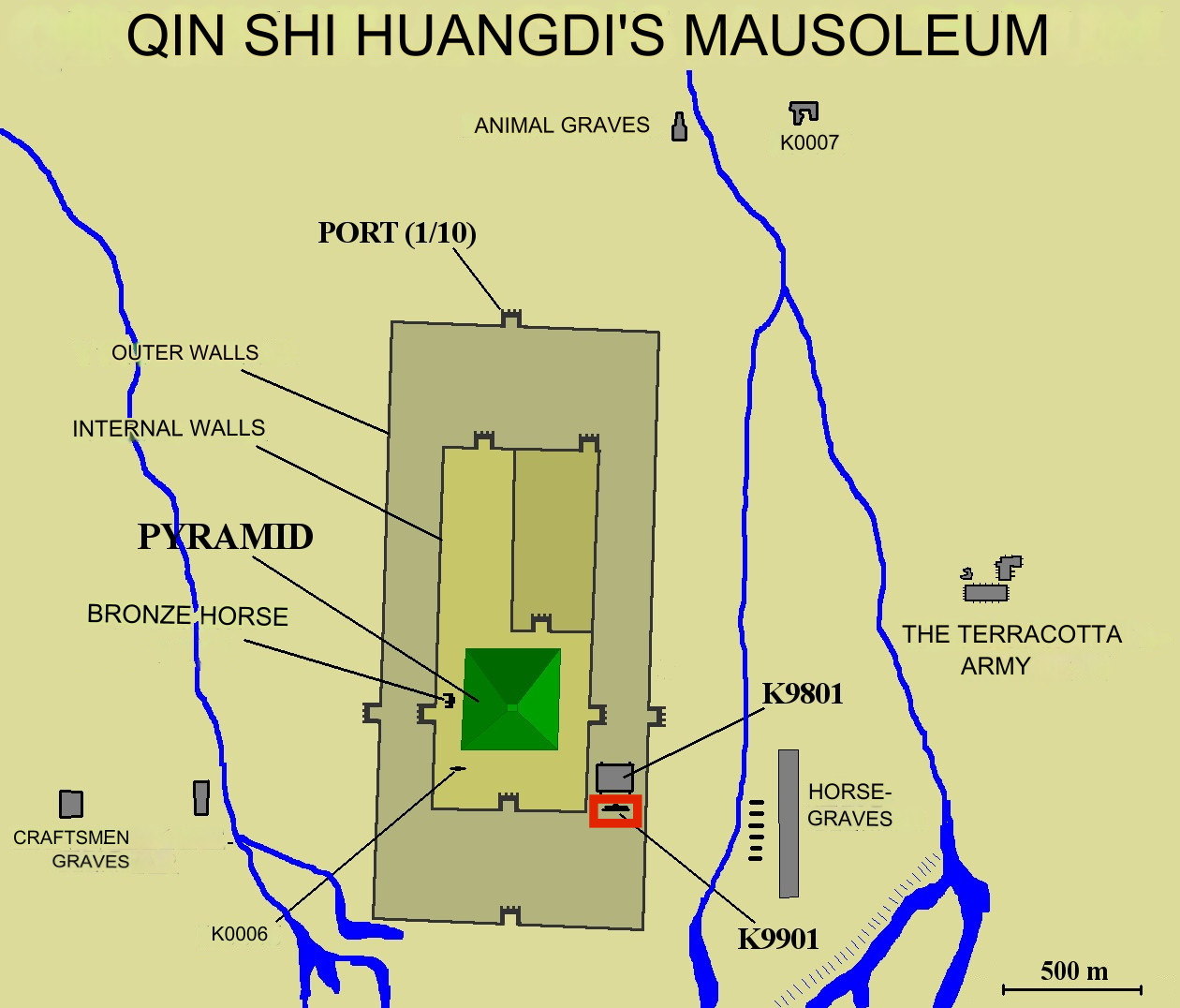
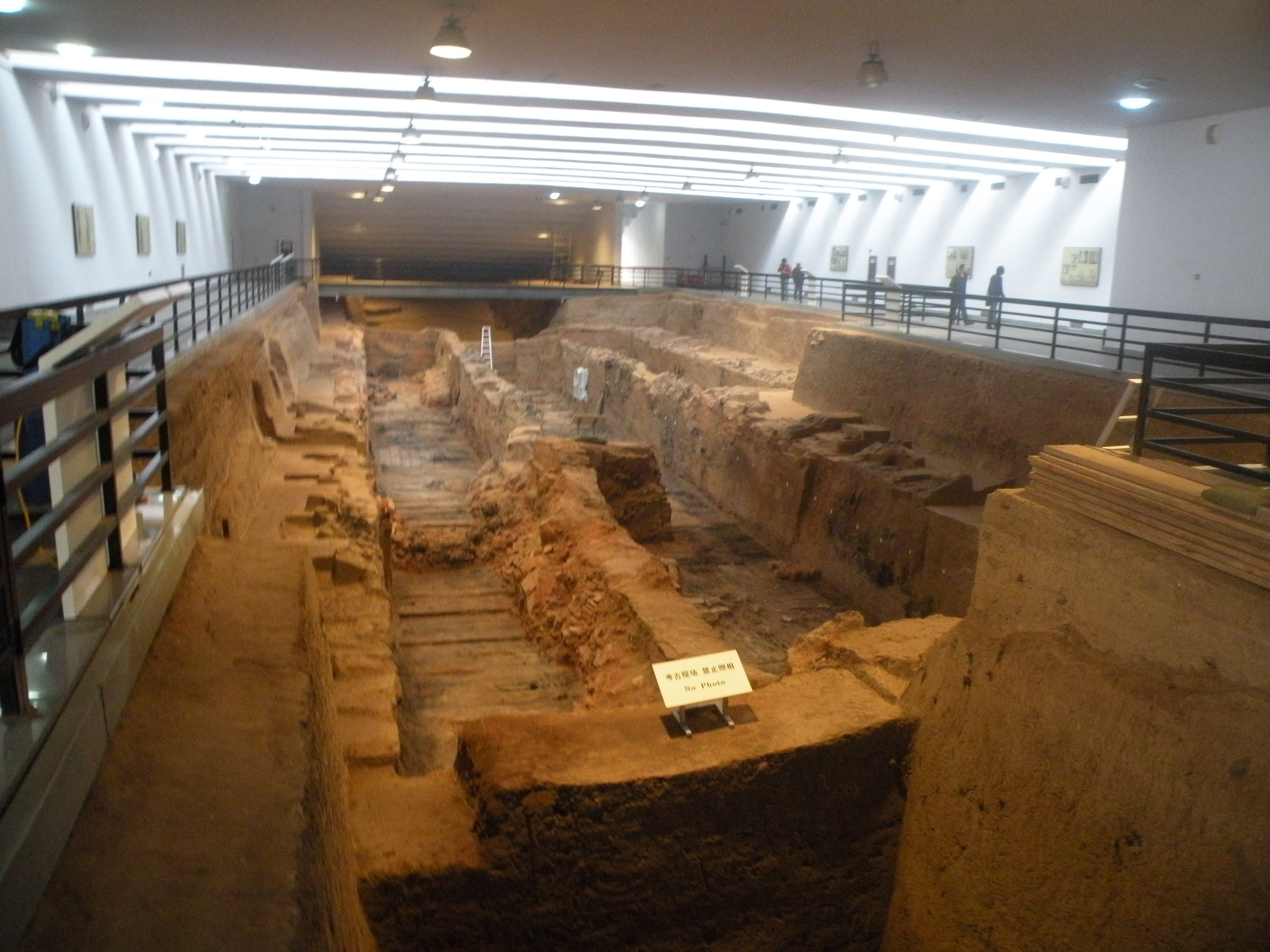
Plan of the Qin Shihuang Mausoleum and location of the Acrobats pit K9901 (in red), and the pit itself under excavation. The central tomb itself has yet to be excavated.

== Chinese precedents ==
Before the Terracotta Army, very few sculptures had ever been created, and none were naturalistic. Among the very few such depictions known in China before that date: four wooden figurines from Liangdaicun (梁帶村) in Hancheng (韓城), Shaanxi, possibly dating to the 9th century BCE; two wooden human figurines of foreigners possibly representing sedan chair bearers from a Qin state tomb in Longxian (隴縣), Shaanxi, from about 700 BCE; and more numerous statuettes from around 5th century bronze musicians in a miniature house from Shaoxing (紹興) in Zhejiang; a 4th-century human-shaped lamp stand from Pingshan (平山) county royal tomb, Hebei.

The Taerpo horserider is a Chinese Zhou dynasty period Warrior-State Qin terracotta figurine from a tomb in the Taerpo cemetery (塔兒坡墓) near Xianyang in Shaanxi Province, dated to the 4th-3rd century BCE. Another nearly-identical statuette is known, from the same tomb. Small holes in his hands suggest that he was originally holding reins in one hand, and a weapon in the other. This is the earliest known representation of a cavalryman in China.

According to Duan Qingbo, there is a possibility that these miniature human and horse shapes were already inspired by the Art of the steppes, as seen in objects such as the figurines of the Saka incense burners.

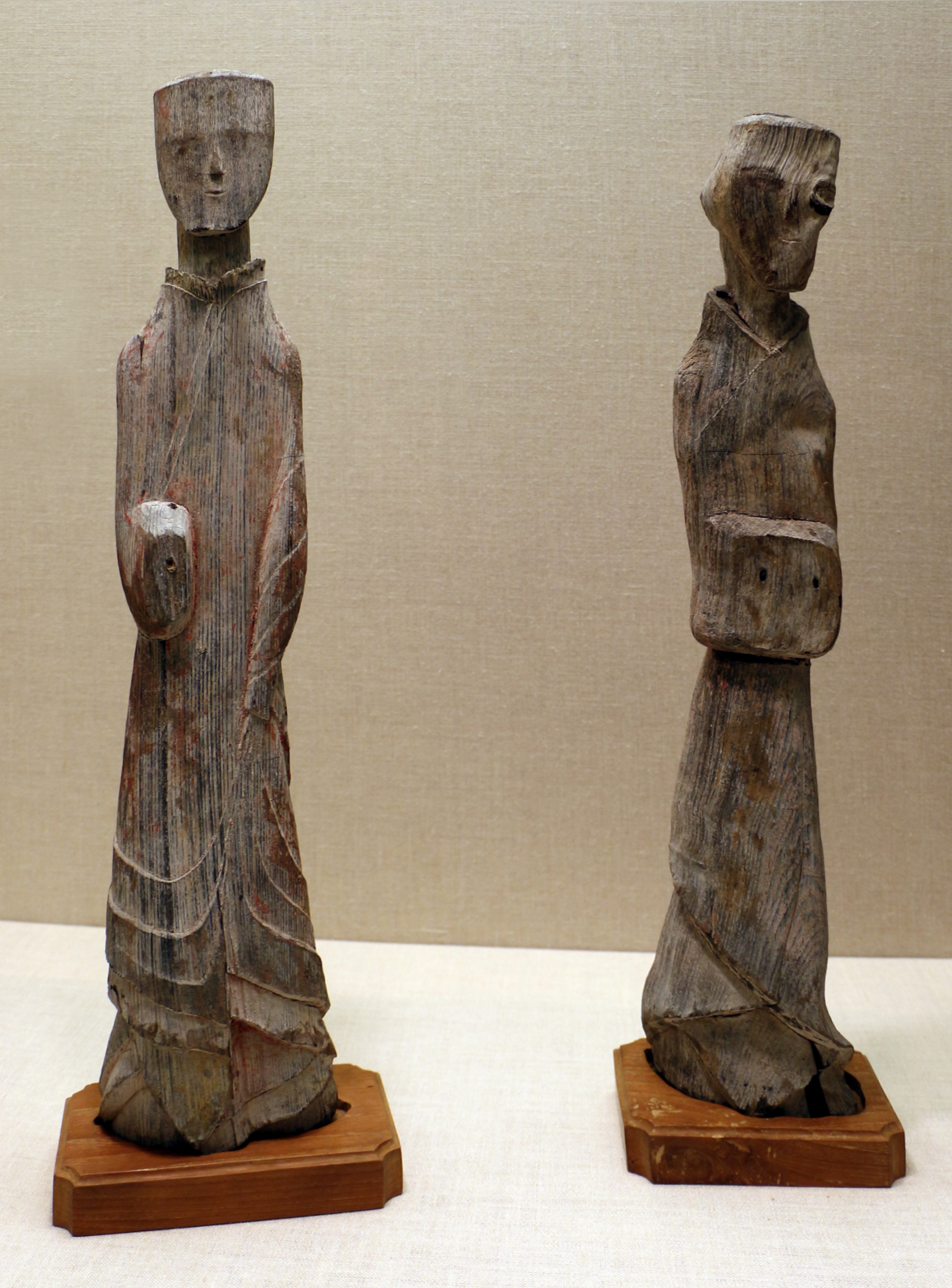
Chu state statuettes, Zhou dynasty-era, 4th-3rd century BCE

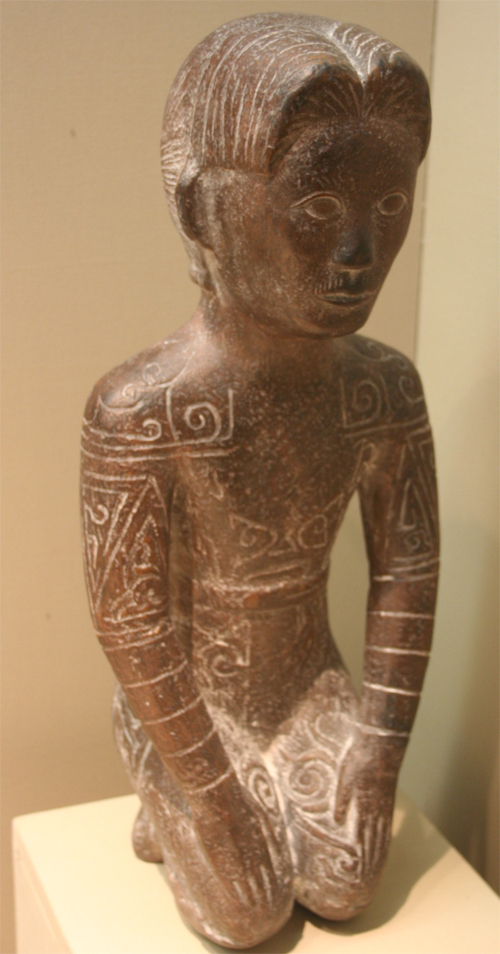
A statue of a man from the State of Yue

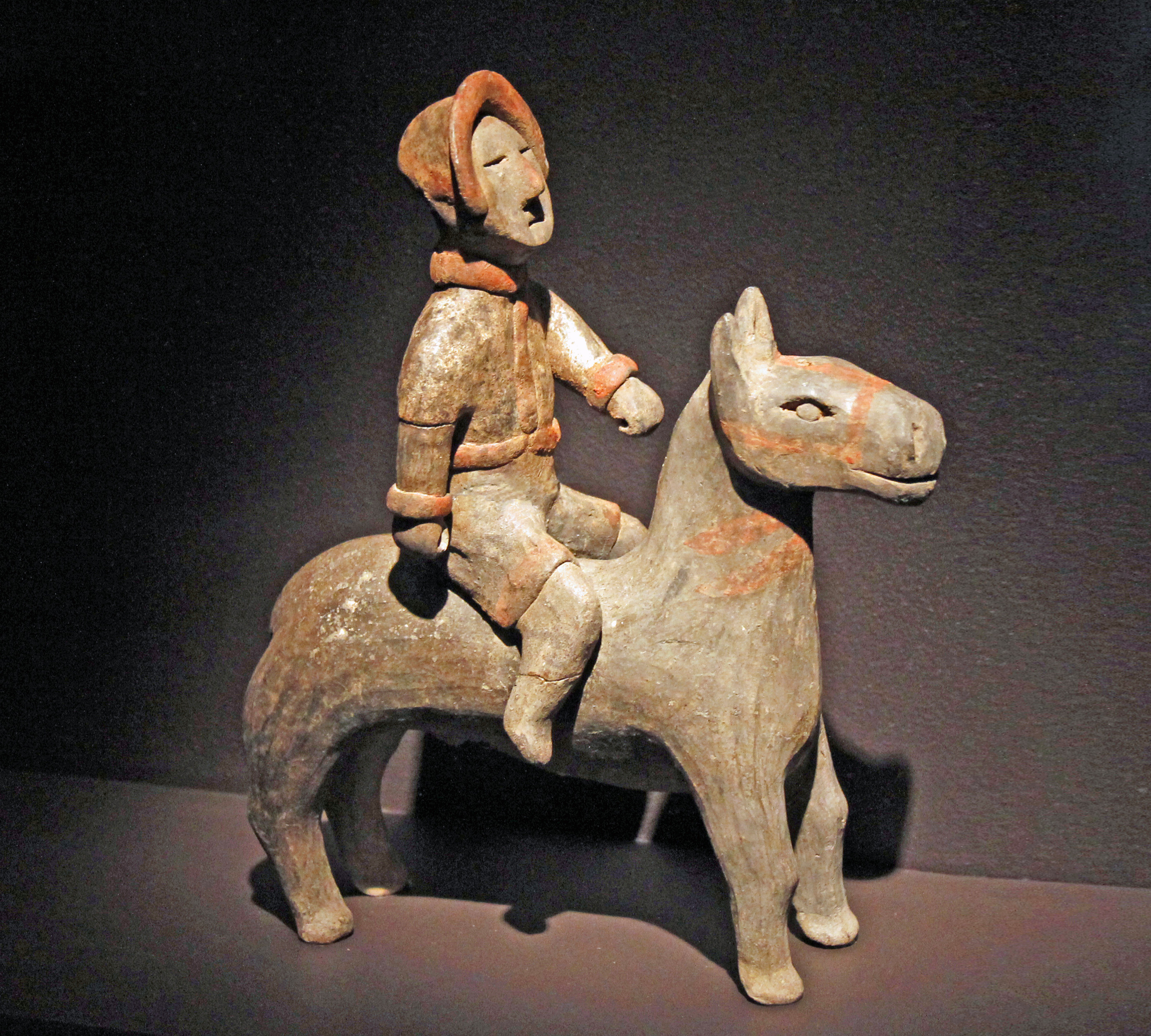
The Taerpo horserider, Qin state, 4th-3rd century BCE

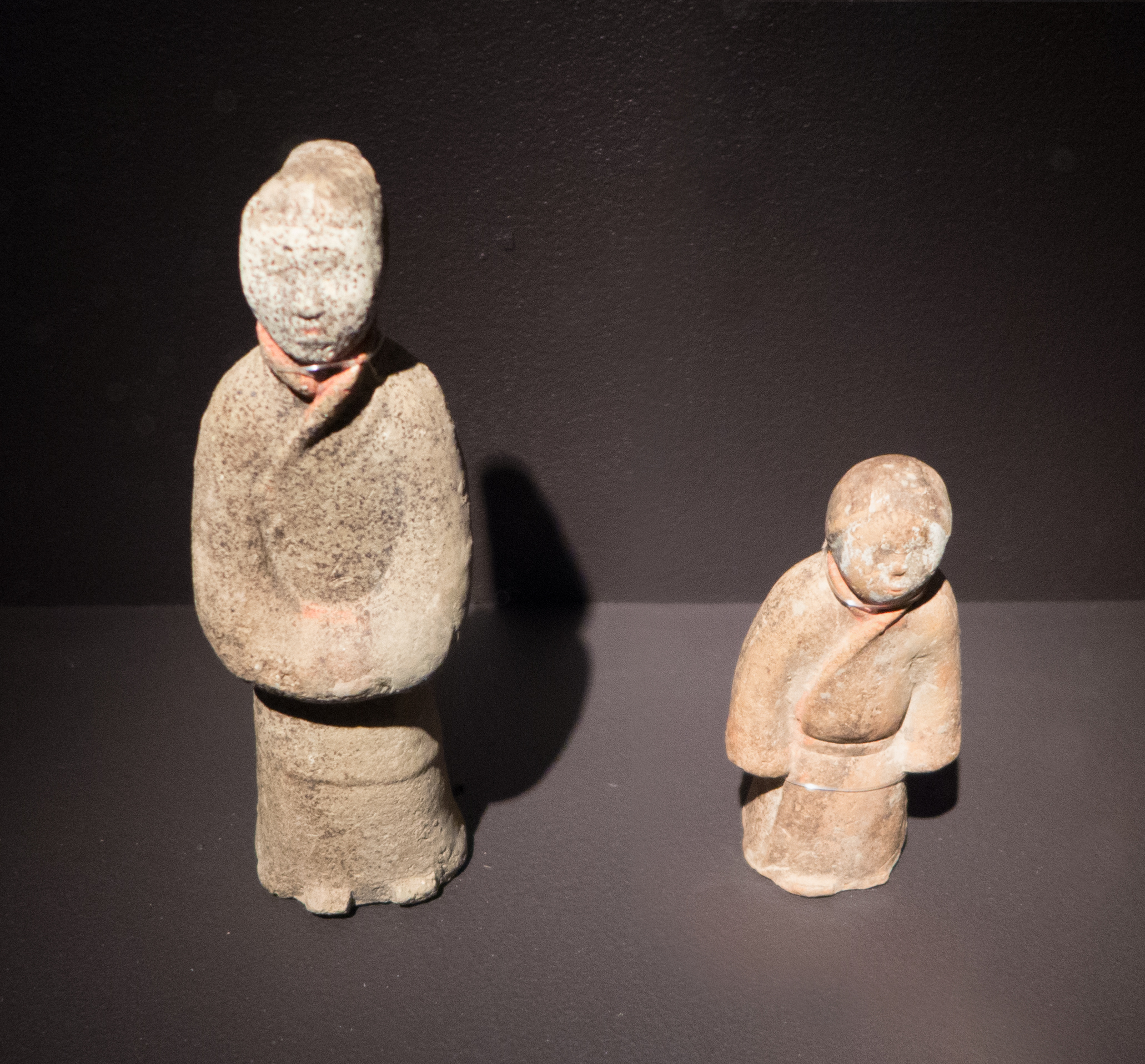
Funerary statuettes, Warring States period

== Theories of possible influences ==
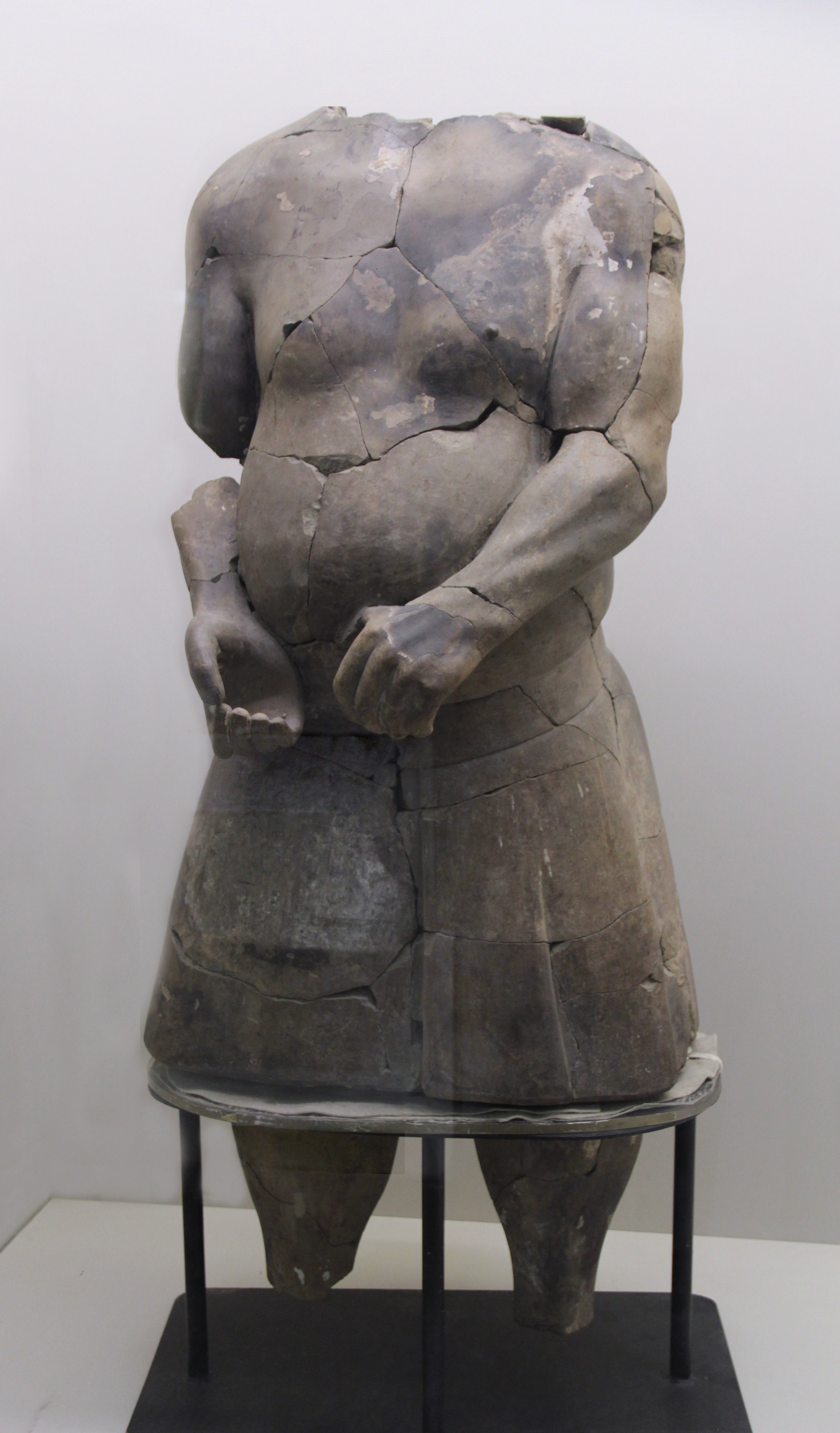
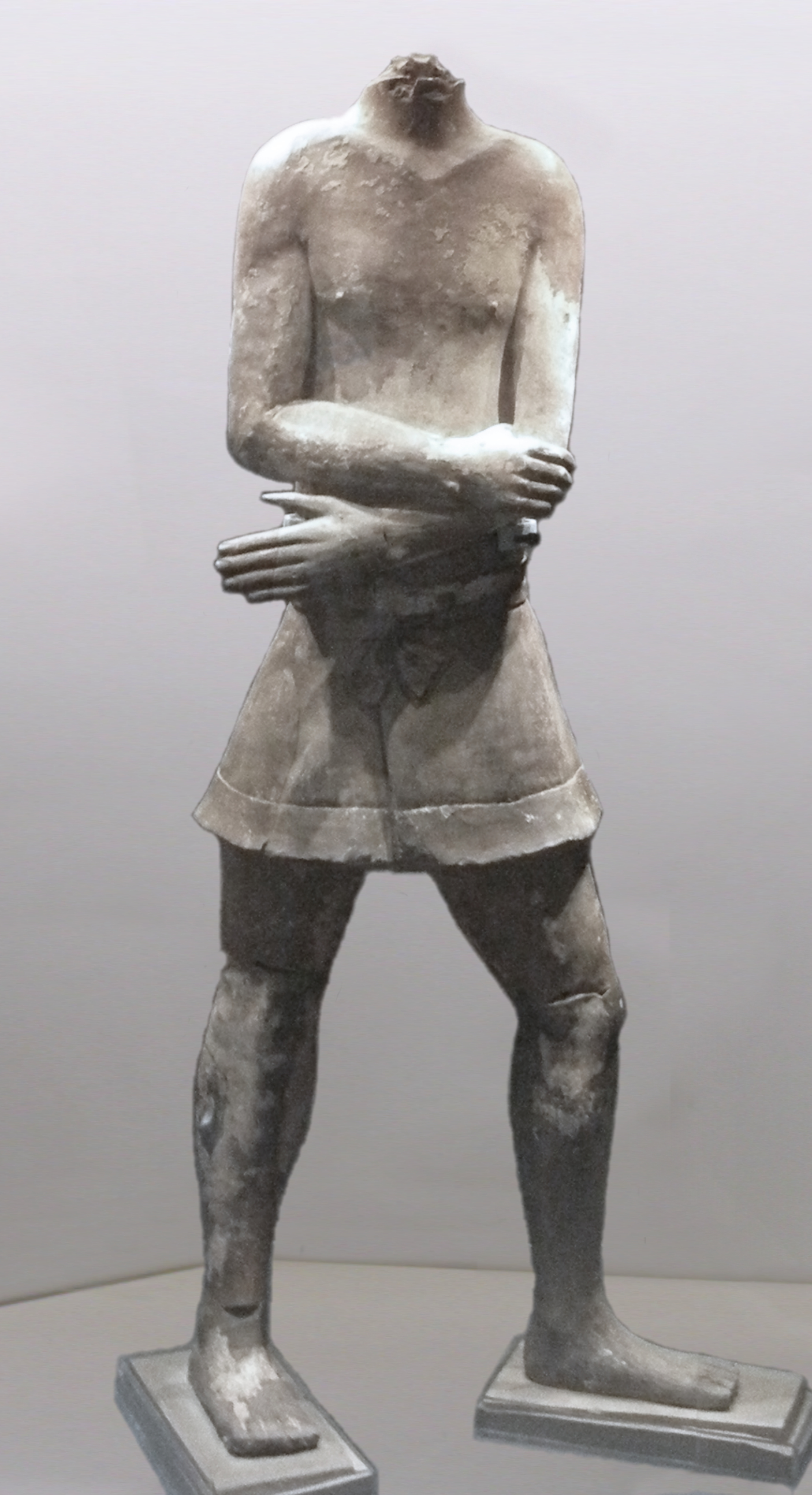
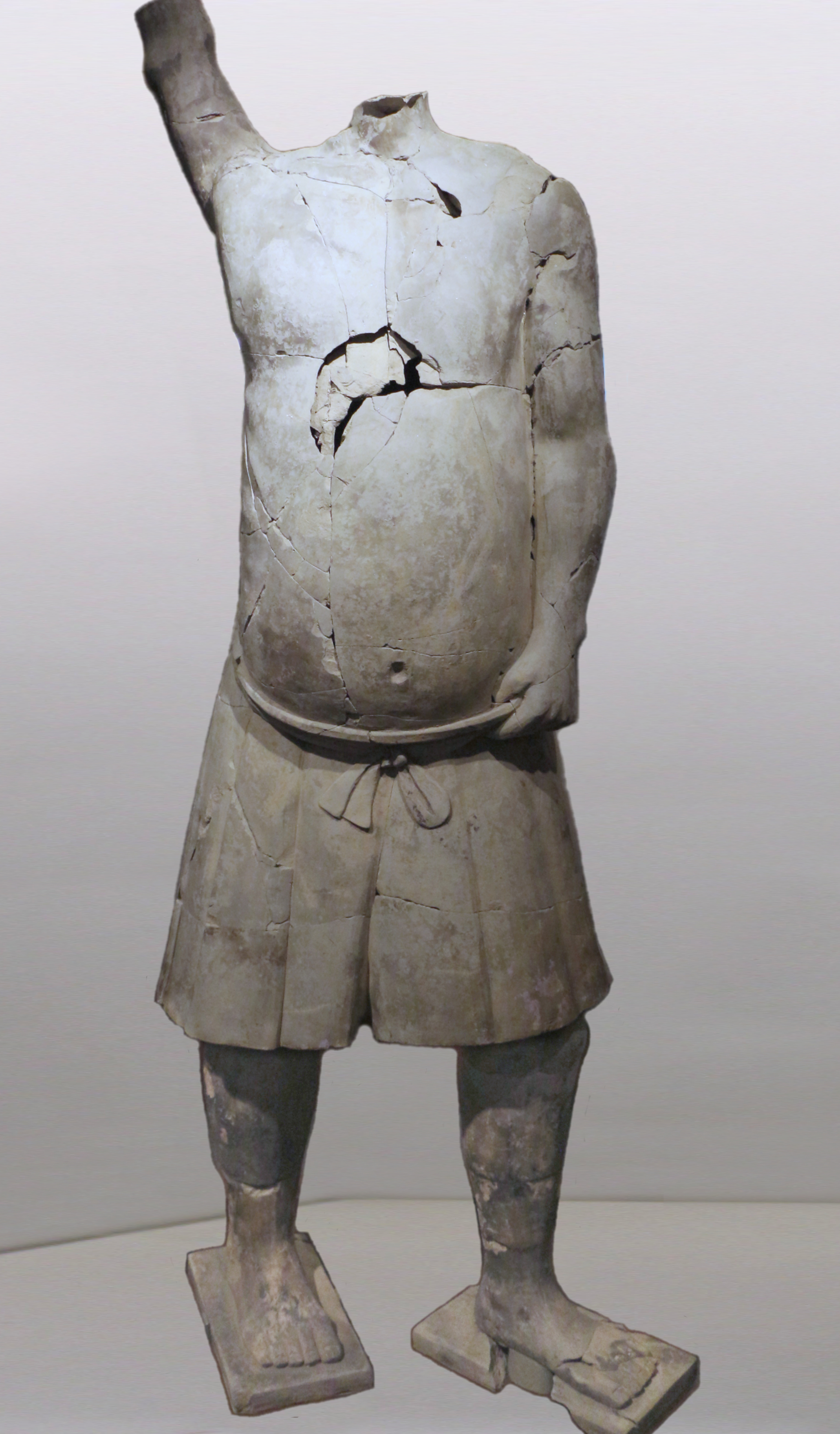
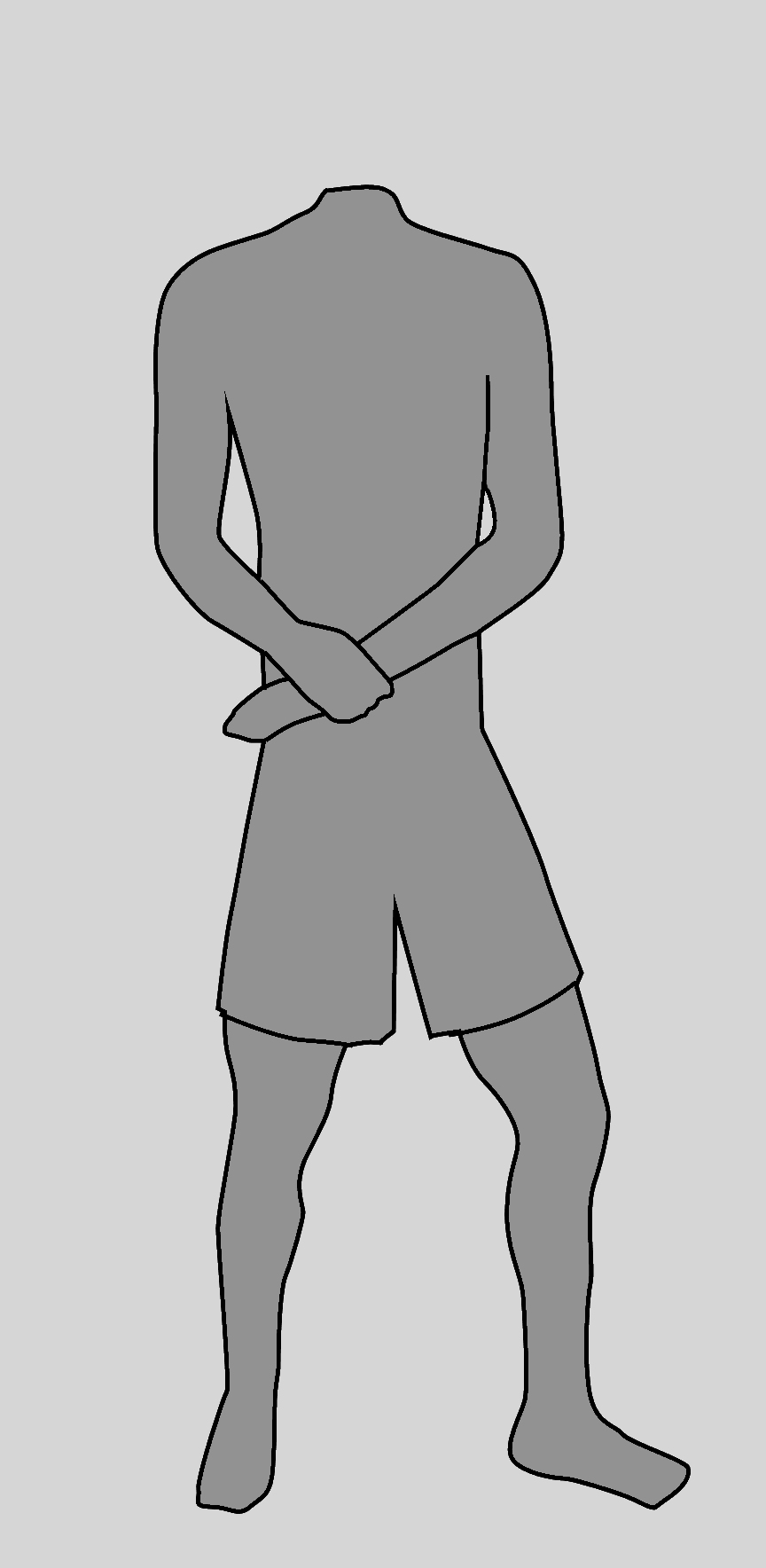
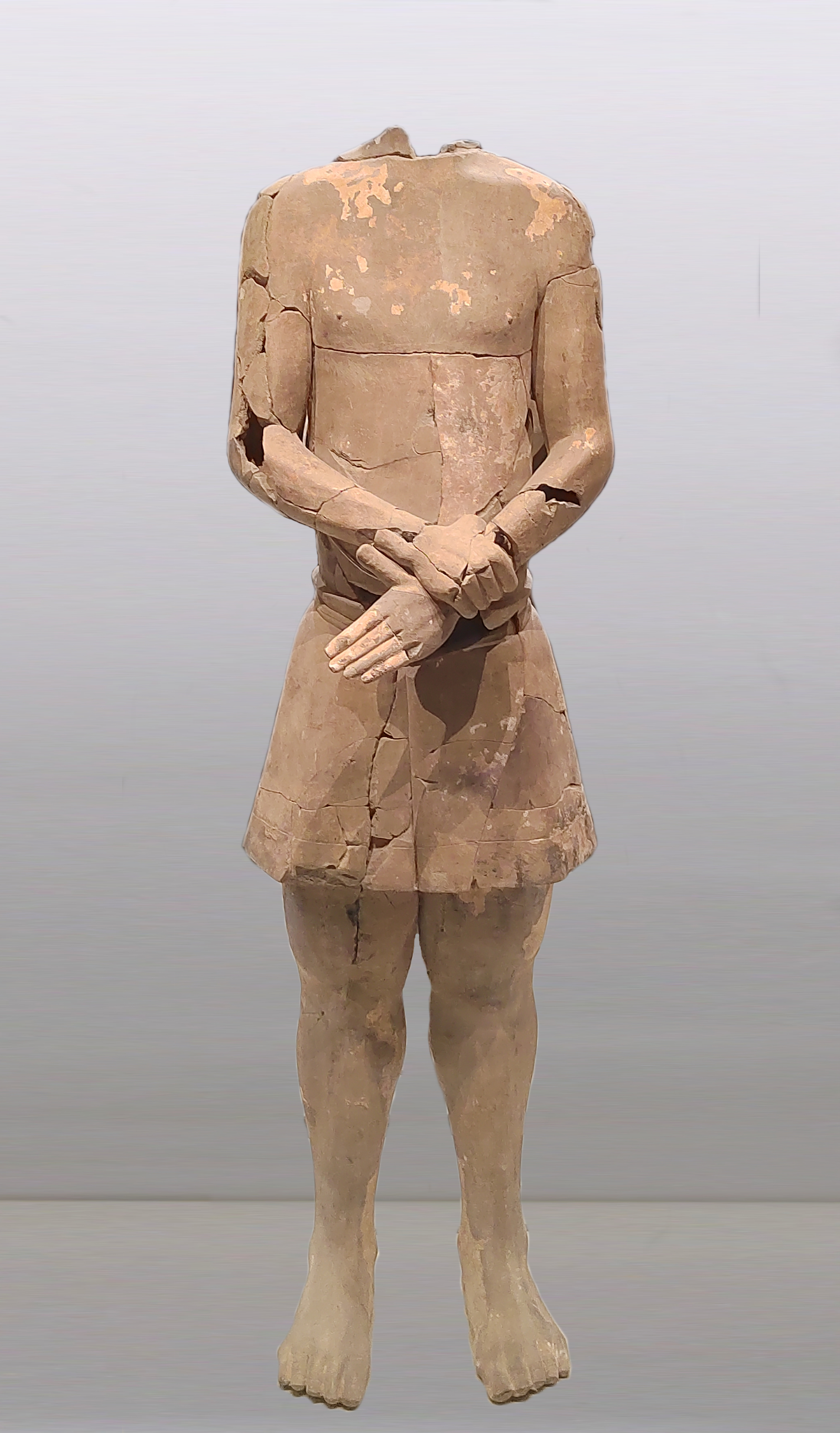
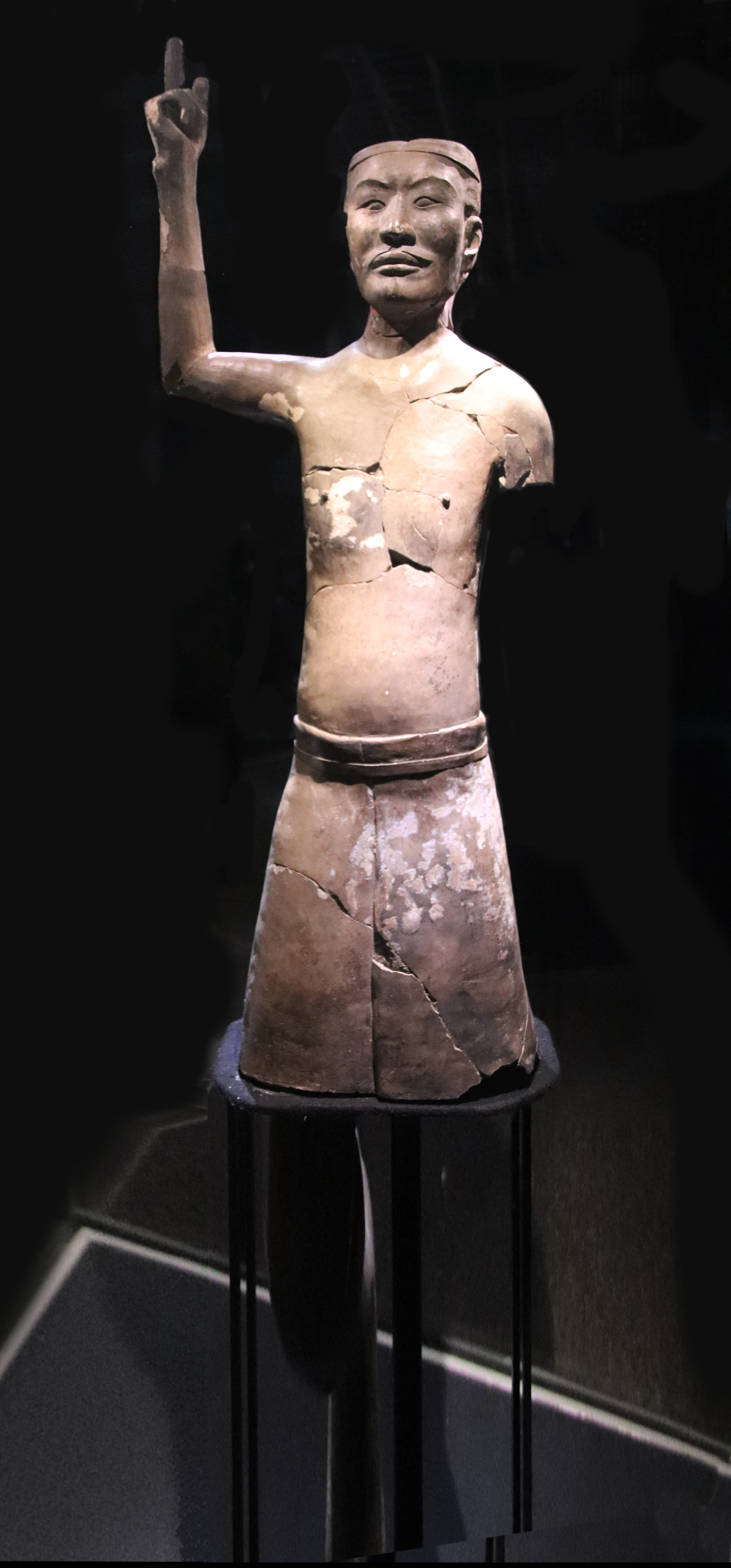
The "Strongman" and another acrobat (top). Bottom: an acrobat raising his arm; silhouette of an acrobat under restoration as of 2016; and two more acrobats, including a slender one with head. Mausoleum of the First Qin Emperor Qin Shihuang, 210 BCE.

The acrobats have been at the center of the research trying to establish the origin of the Qin statues. Since the time of their discovery, the figures have been noted for their exceptional stylistic realism and individualism, with assessments having found that no two figures share the exact same features. The naturalism of the statues has encouraged claims of Hellenistic art influence.

The earliest note on this aspect was that of 20th century art historian German Hafner who, in 1986, was the first to speculate on a possible Hellenistic link to these sculptures due to the unusual display of naturalism relative to general Qin era sculpture: "the art of the terracotta army originated from Western contact, originated from knowledge of Alexander the Great and the splendor of Greek art". This idea was also generally supported by Duan Qingbo, Director of the excavation team at the First Emperor's necropolis from 1998 to 2008, or by Professor Lukas Nickel of SOAS. Duan Qingbo also noted the close similarity of the Terracotta Army with the Central Asian Khalchayan statuary, in style as well as in technique. Li Xiuzhen, senior archaeologist from the Mausoleum Site Museum, acknowledged Western influence but insisted on Chinese authorship: "We now think the Terracotta Army, the acrobats and the bronze sculptures found on site were inspired by ancient Greek sculptures and art", but although "the terracotta warriors may be inspired by Western culture, they were uniquely made by the Chinese" and "we found no Greek names on the backs of Terracotta Warriors, which supports my idea that there was no Greek artisan training the local sculptors".

Others have argued that such speculations rest on flawed and old "Eurocentric" ideas that assumed other civilizations were incapable of sophisticated artistry and thus foreign artistry must be seen through Western traditions. Darryl Wilkinson of Dartmouth College has instead argued that the Qin era display of sculptural naturalism, alongside that of the pre-Columbian Moche culture in Peru, indicate that "the Greeks did not invent naturalism" and that "naturalism is not the product of any one culture's civilizational 'genius.'" Dr. Raoul McLaughlin, an independent researcher on Roman trade, said there is no Greek influence on the Terracotta Army and emphasized the differences in artisanship, construction material, and symbology.

=== Possibles foreign sources of inspiration ===
Various Hellenistic sources from Central Asia, more or less contemporary with the Qin Mausoleum have been suggested. In the 4th and 3rd century BCE, Alexander the Great and its successors state the Seleucid Empire and the Greco-Bactrian kingdom are known to have ruled over large part of Central Asia as far as Sogdiana, at the doorstep of the Tarim Basin and China beyond. Alexander is known to have brought artists with him in his expeditions, such as Lysippos and Apelles. In the centuries after him, major Hellenistics cities developed in Central Asia, such as Ai-Khanoum and Takht-i Sangin. These cities, thriving with Hellenistic, could well have been the source of artistic influence over China, until the fall of Ai-Khanoum circa 135 BCE, to Saka and Yuezhi nomads. Some of the Helenistic art of Central Asia persisted in the 1st century BCE, as seen in the statuary of Khalchayan, using clay-molding techniques and human-sized realism similar to those of the Qin Terracotta Army.

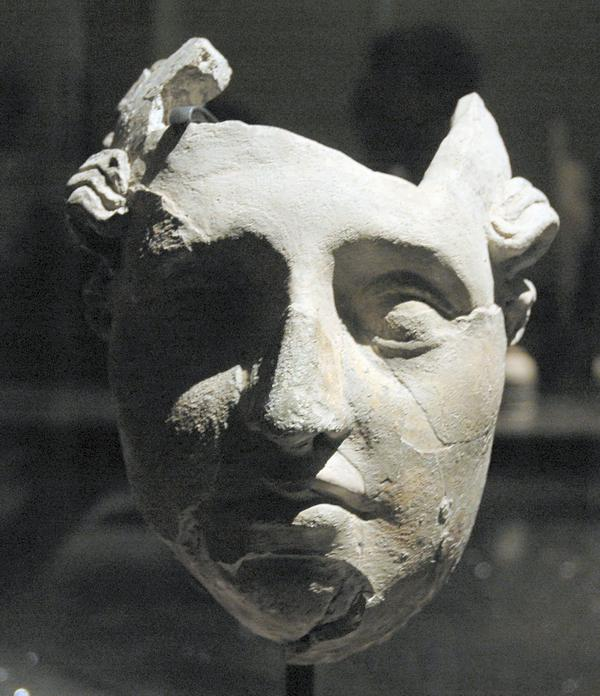
Portrait of a man, Ai-Khanoum, 3rd-2nd century BC.

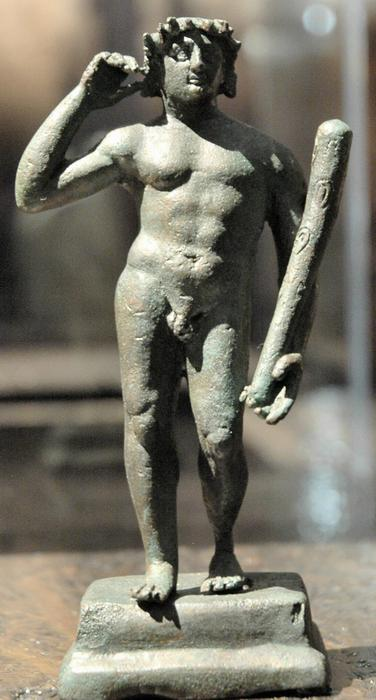
Statue of Herakles from Ai-Khanoum, 3rd-2nd century BC.

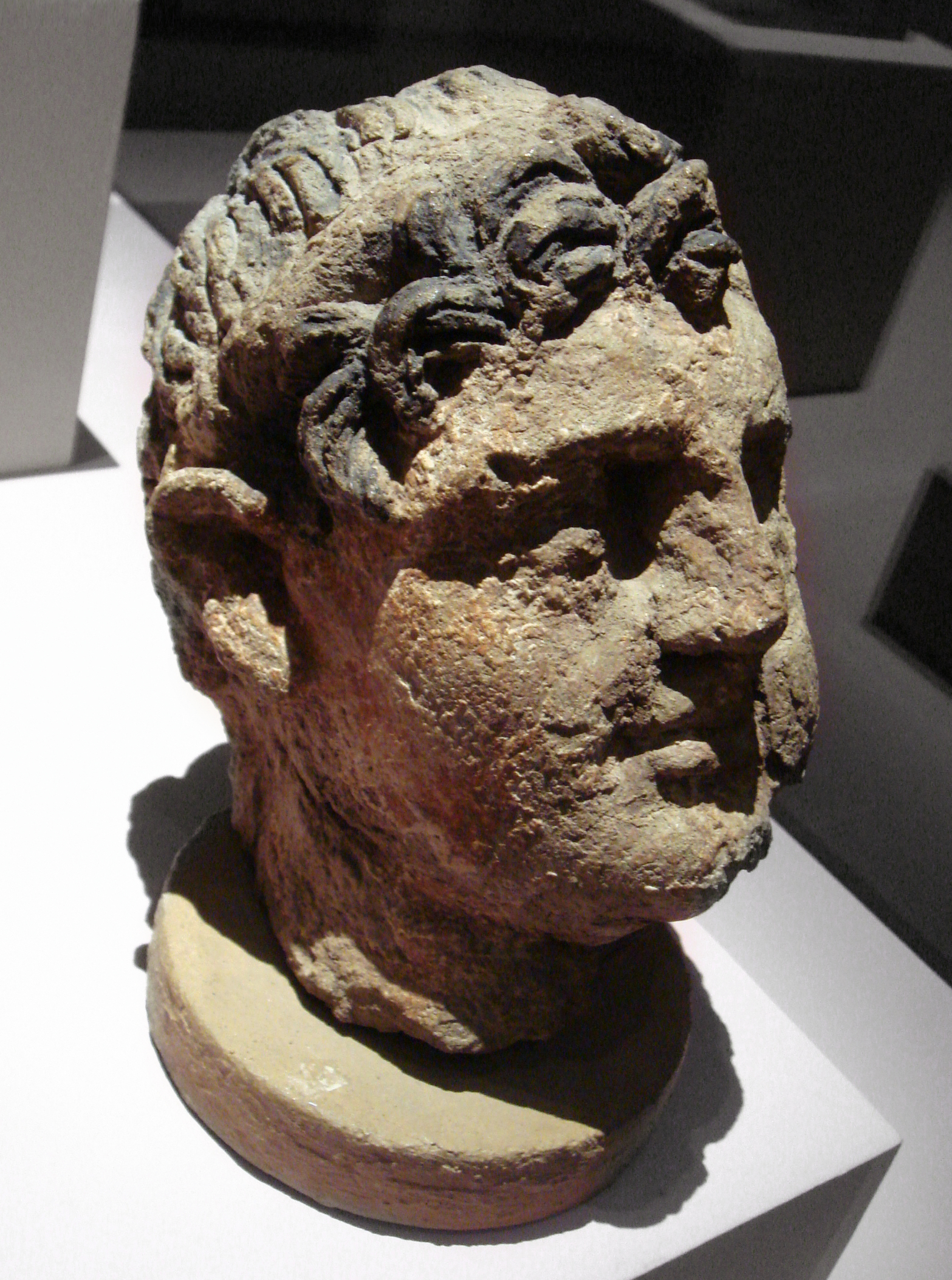
Clay and pigment head of a Greco-Bactrian ruler with diadem, Temple of the Oxus, Takht-i Sangin, 3rd-2nd century BC.

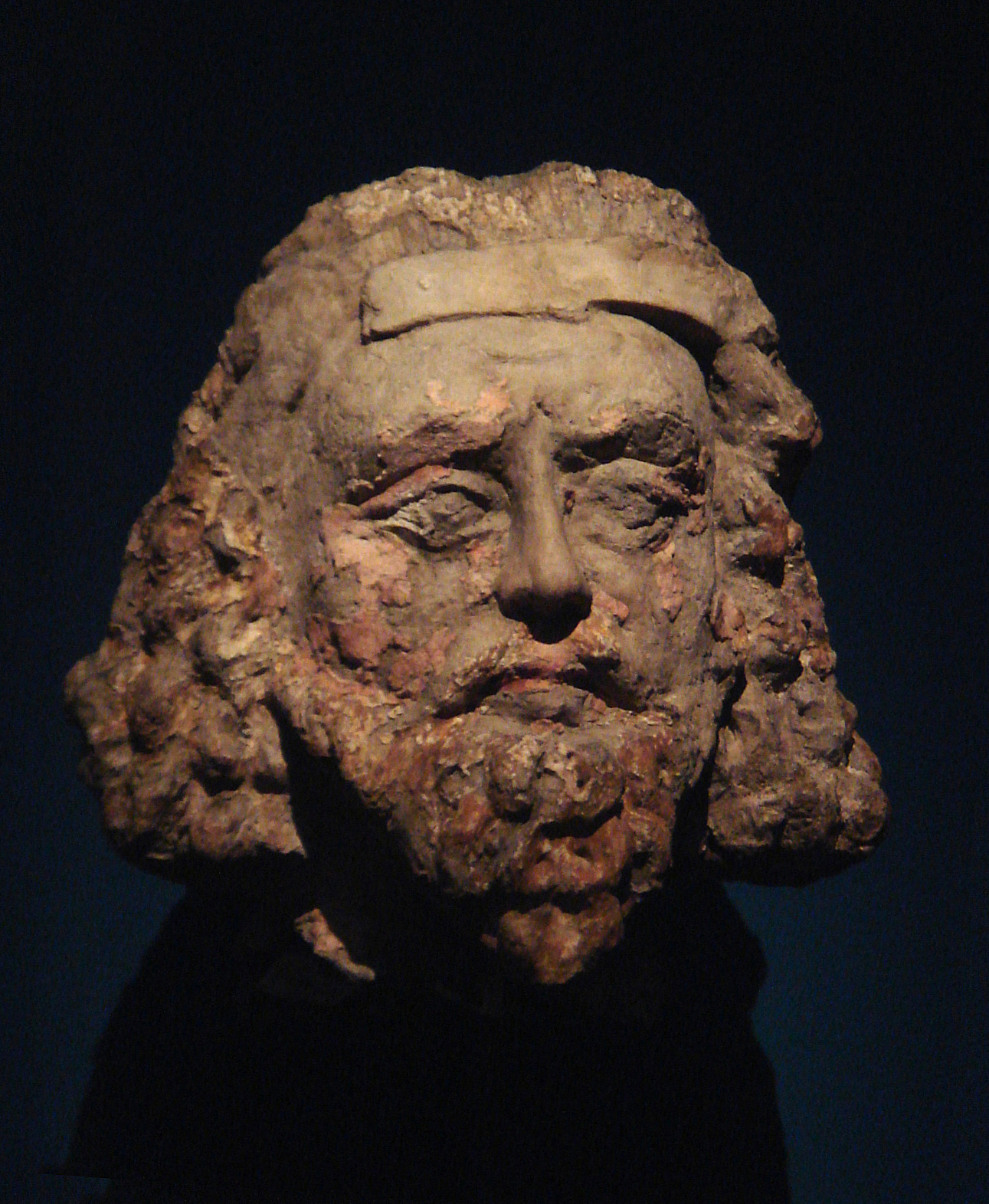
Human-sized realistic clay and pigment terracotta statuary from Khalchayan, 1st century BCE.

The Sakas (8th-2nd century BCE), are known to have been in contact with China and contributed to the transfer of horseriding and metal technologies. They also may have contributed to the transfer of artistic realism from Central Asia. A naturalistic bronze statuette of a warrior was excavated north of the Tian Shan, which shows how far and wide Hellenistic styles travelled. Could alternatively be a Greek hoplite.

== Chinese records of transmission ==
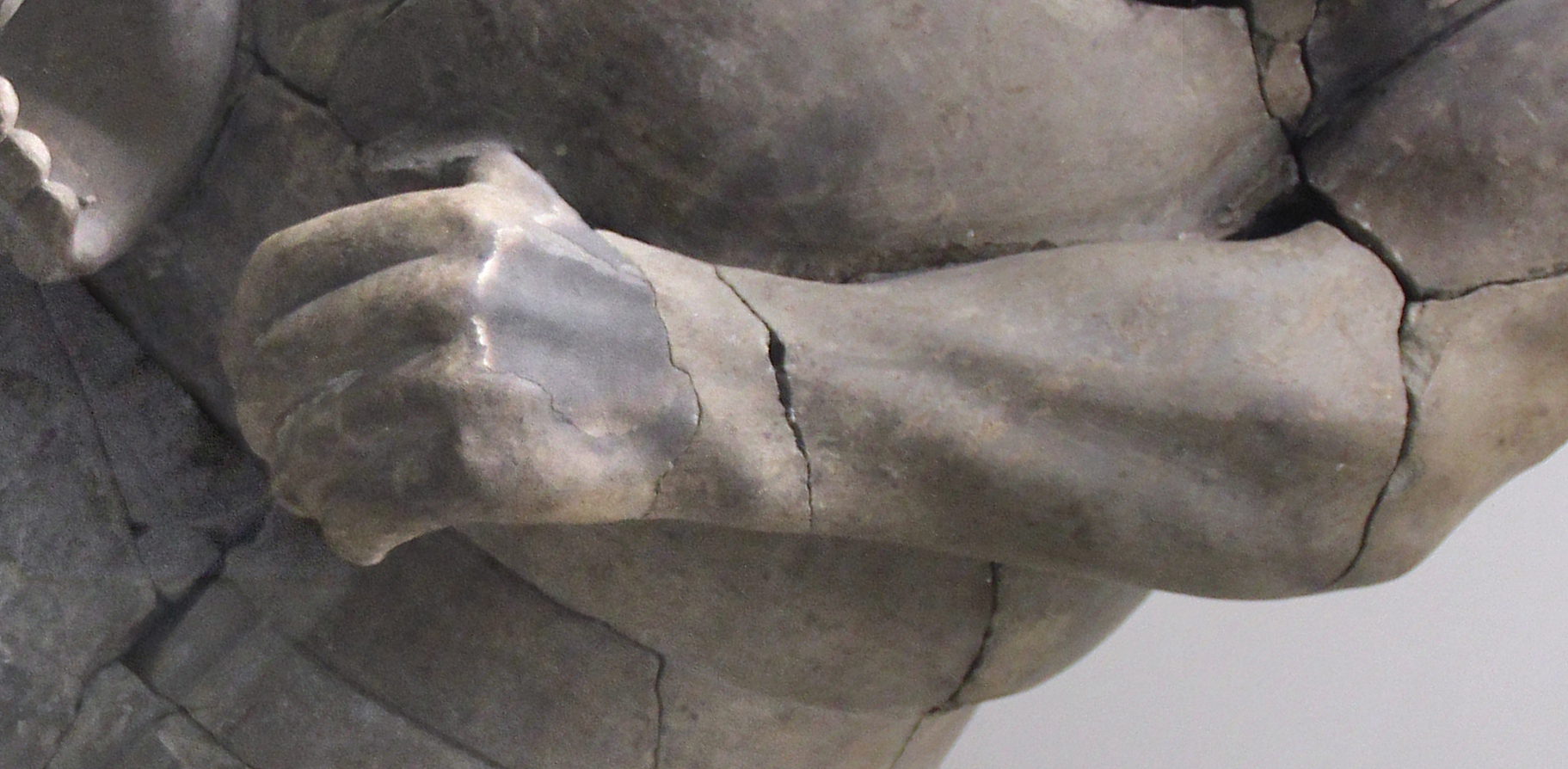
Detail of the left forearm of the "Strongman" of the Acrobats.

Chinese records seem to suggest to that the Qin Emperor built monumental bronze statues for his Palace, that replicated some large foreign statues or giants (大人 daren) encountered at the western end of the country, in Lintao, Gansu. These bronze statues, known as the Twelve Metal Colossi, remained very famous in ancient China and were the object of numerous commentaries, until they were lost around the 4th century CE. These records indicate that the Qin Emperor received from western regions a major impulse for the creation of monumental statuary, which may naturally have influenced the creation of the monumental statues of his Mausoleum. Lukas Nickel believes the first Qin Emperor seems to have made monumental statues on the western model for his Palace, which provides an intriguing precedent for the monumental naturalistic statuary of his Mausoleum. However Frederick Shih-chung Chen disputes that foreign statues at the western border may have been the model for the Twelve Metal Colossi of the First Emperor. Based on narrative context in the records, the mention of twelve giants represented a sign of ill omen represented by human abnormalities. Wu Hung says that the records present some support for the theory of foreign influence, but considers the descriptions of the twelve statues to be tales and legends requiring "substantial new archaeological evidence" to substantiate.

== Bibliography ==
- Chen, Frederick Shih-chung (2021), "Not That Kind of Big Men: A Response to Lukas Nickel's Interpretation of the Term da ren 大人 in Lintao 臨洮", Journal of the American Oriental Society
- Hung, Wu (2020), "Thinking Through Scale: The First Emperor's Sculptural Enterprise", Figurines: Figuration and the Sense of Scale, Oxford University Press, ISBN 978-0-19-886109-6
