= Ruan Wengzhong =

Chinese hero of the Qin dynasty

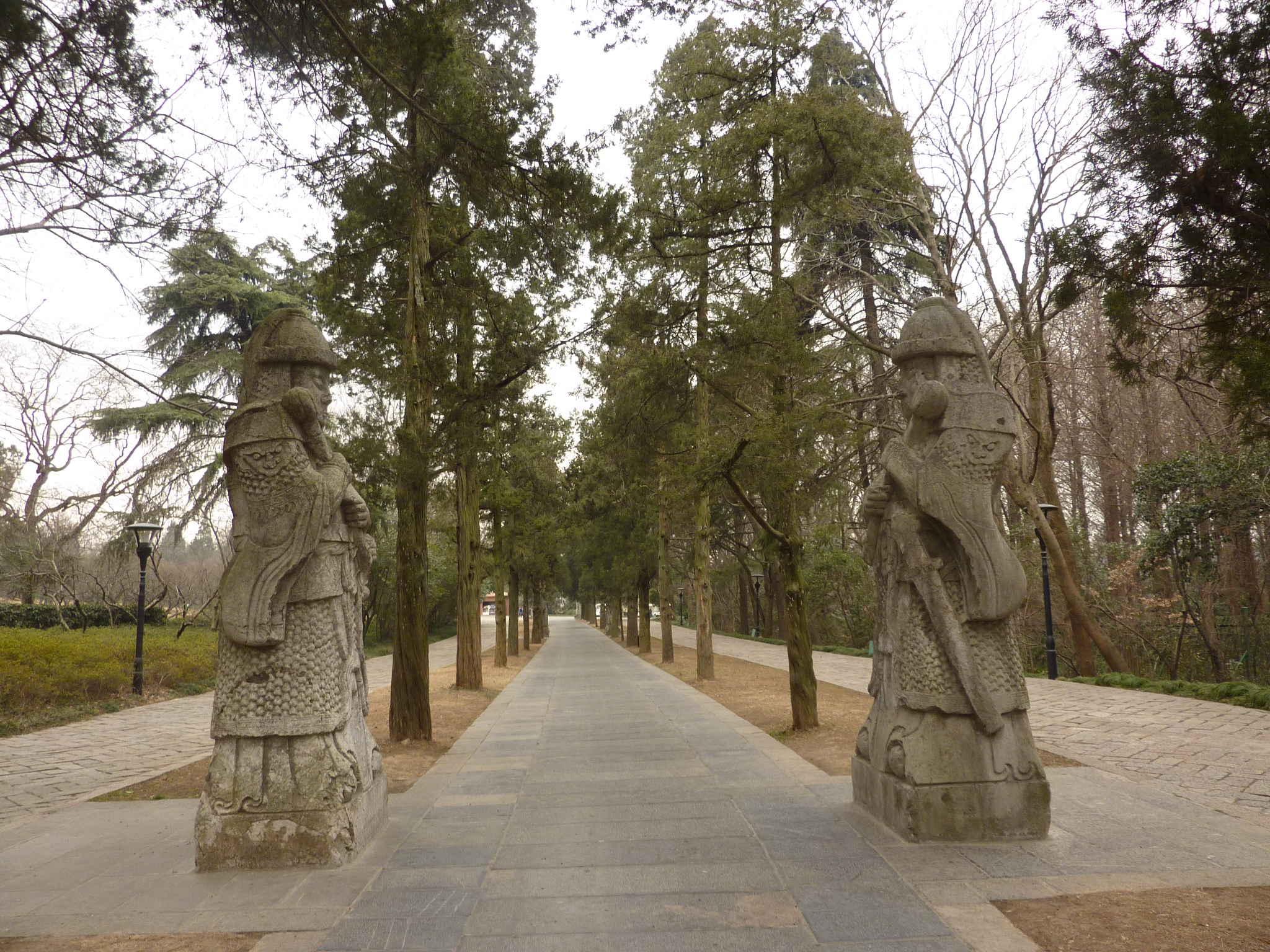
The 250-m long Wengzhong Road is the second section of the Spirit Way (Shendao) of the Ming Xiaoling Mausoleum. It is lined with the statues of civil and military officials, two pairs of each.

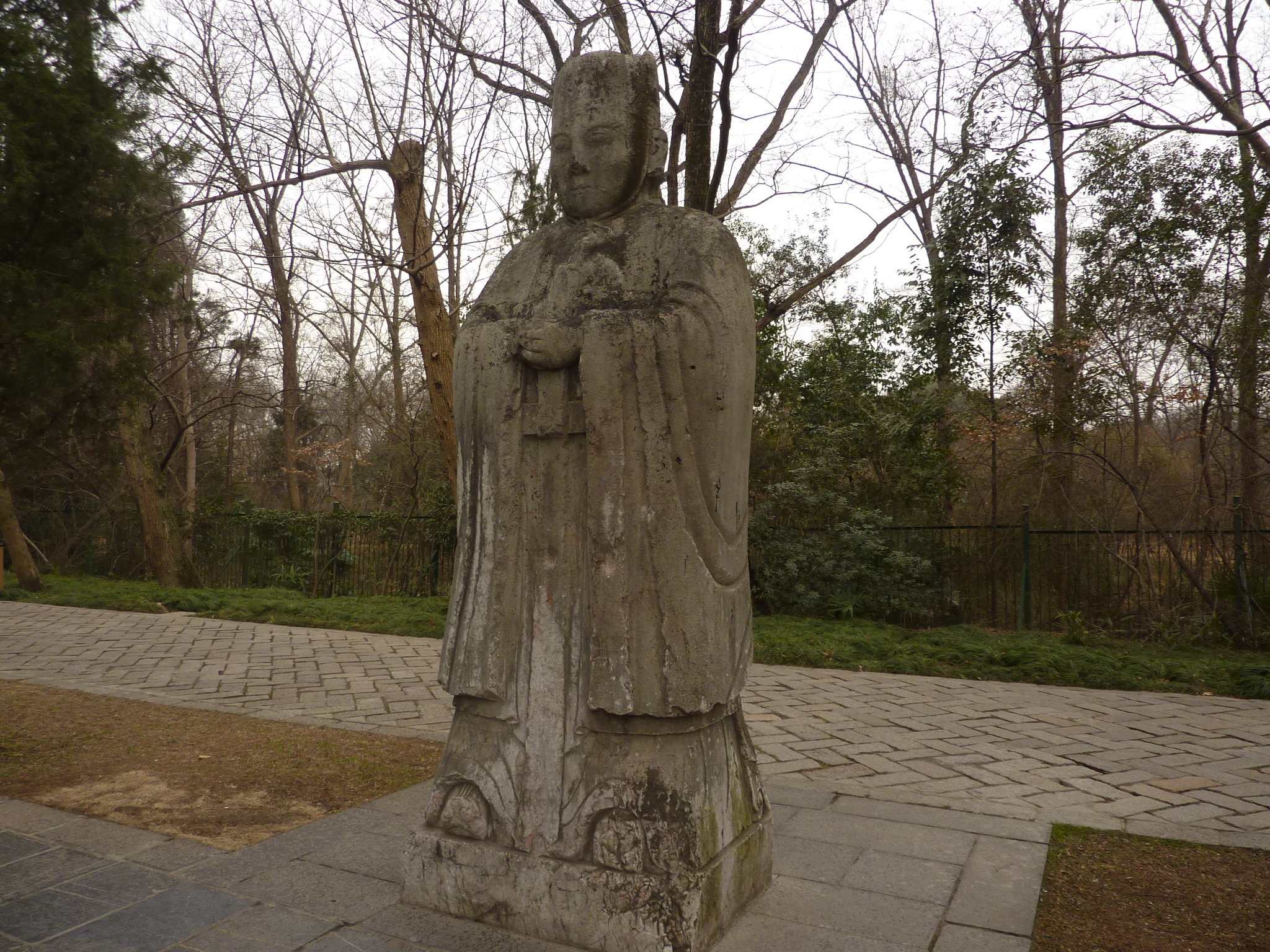
Monumantal statue at Wengzhong Road

Ruan Wengzhong (Chinese: 阮翁仲) was a historical person during the Qin dynasty, who was recorded to have fought against the Xiongnu on the Great Wall at the border city of Lintao. He was allegedly a 3 meters tall giant. His story was first mentioned by the 3rd century CE writer Gao You in his commentary of the Huainanzi, and later developed in the 6th century Commentary on the Water Classic:

In the 26th year of the First Emperor of Qin's reign, with all under heaven having just been annexed, there was a giant who appeared in Lintao. He was 5 zhang and his footprint was 8 chi long. So an image was drawn of him, and a metal statue was cast of his likeness. This was Wengzhong Junhe

— Gao You in his commentary of the Huainanzi

Qin Shi Huang, the first Emperor of China, built a giant bronze statue of his likeness, in addition to his more famous Twelve Metal Colossi, by melting the bronze weapons captured in his victory over the Six Kingdoms. The statue was placed outside the Epang Palace at Xianyang, in modern-day Shaanxi Province.

"Wengzhong" has become a generic term for large scale statues of bronze and stone, and for jade statuettes (玉翁仲) placed within the coffin of the dead.

== In Vietnamese legends ==
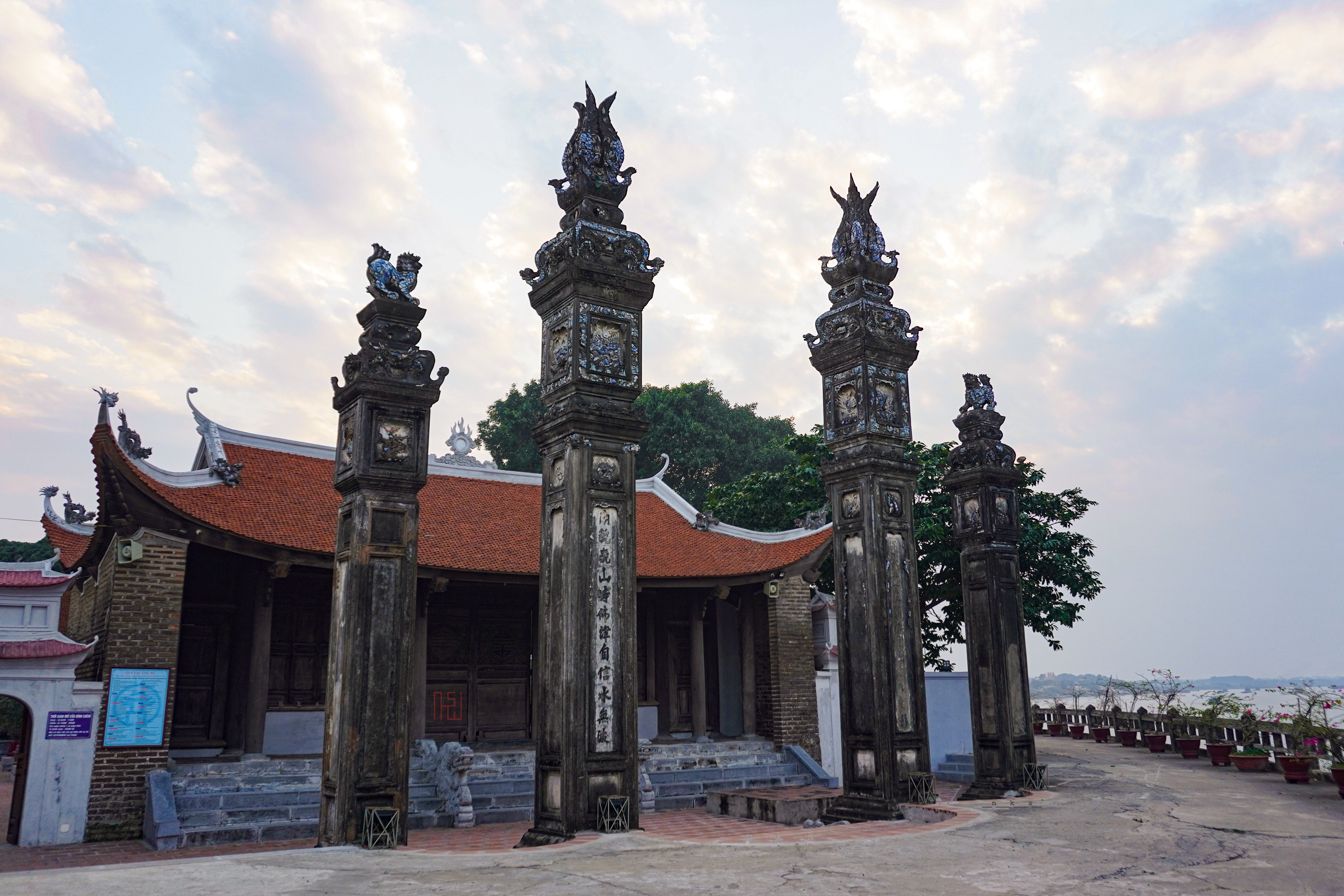
Chèm temple where Lý Ông Trọng is the main village god.

According to Việt Điện U Linh Tập, a 14th-century collection of Vietnamese history and mythologies, Ruan Wengzhong was called Lý Ông Trọng (李翁仲) and was a native of Từ Liêm district of Jiaozhi before becoming a Qin official. Lý Ông Trọng is still being worshipped in the Chèm Temple in his native hometown in today's Bắc Từ Liêm district of Hanoi.
