= Duan Qingbo =

Chinese archaeologist (1964–2019)

- 段清波
- Born: February 1964; Ruicheng County, Shanxi, China
- Died: October 13, 2019 (aged 55); Xi'an, Shaanxi, China
- Occupations: Archaeologist, professor, cultural heritage manager

Academic background
- Education: Northwest University

Academic work
- Discipline: Archaeology, cultural heritage management
- Sub-discipline: Archaeology of China
- Institutions: Shaanxi Provincial Institute of Archaeology; Mausoleum of the First Qin Emperor; Northwest University
- Main interests: Qin dynasty, Han dynasty, Sui dynasty, Tang dynasty
- Notable works: Qin Mausoleum: A Dust-Laden Empire (2018)

Duan Qingbo (Chinese: 段清波; February 1964 – 13 October 2019) was a Chinese archaeologist. He served as the chief archaeologist of the Mausoleum of the First Qin Emperor and Dean of the School of Cultural Heritage of Northwest University in Xi'an. He discovered the large-scale drainage system of Qin Shi Huang's mausoleum and a high-ranking noble tomb in the mausoleum precinct. He also spent over two years surveying more than 1,900 kilometres (1,200 mi) of the Great Wall on foot.

== Life and career ==
Duan was born in February 1964 in Ruicheng County, Shanxi, China. He graduated from Northwest University in Xi'an with a bachelor's degree in archaeology in 1985. He later earned a Ph.D. in archaeology in 2008.

He began working at the Shaanxi Provincial Institute of Archaeology in 1988, where he served as deputy director of the Qin–Han Archaeological Research Office and director of the Sui–Tang Archaeological Research Office.

In 1998, Duan was appointed chief archaeologist of the Mausoleum of the First Qin Emperor. In the following decade, he led the excavation of the 3-square-kilometre (1.2 sq mi) mausoleum precinct. His team discovered the ruins of China's three oldest and largest que towers, the mausoleum's large-scale underground dam and drainage system, and a large double-ramped noble tomb that ranks only below Qin Shi Huang's own mausoleum in importance. He oversaw the publication of three excavation reports, in 1999, 2000, and 2002.

Duan's excavations led him to the conclusion that the underground realm of the mausoleum imitated the real organization of the court in the emperor's lifetime, with terracotta officials, musicians, even acrobats and realistic bronze waterfowl, in addition to the famous Terracotta Army. He also found that the emperor might have employed people from west Eurasia, as the structure of the mausoleum bore similarities to the Mausoleum at Halicarnassus, which had been built a century earlier in today's Turkey. In his long article Sino-Western Cultural Exchange as Seen through the Archaeology of the First Emperor's Necropolis Duan Qingbo generally supported the idea that the Terracotta Army and the Qin Shihuang Mausoleum were influenced by Hellenistic art. In 2018, he also held a conferences at UCLA entitled Persian and Greek Participation in the making of China’s First Empire.

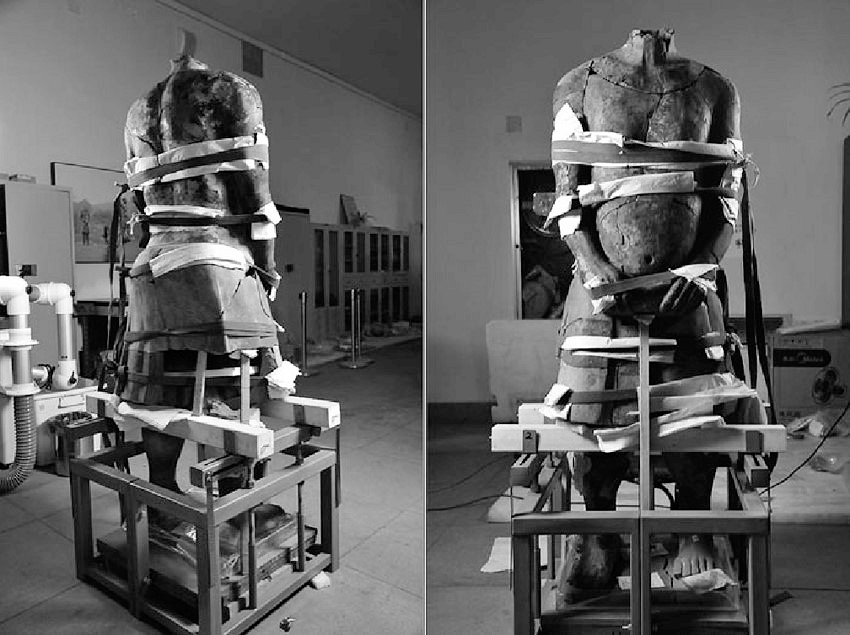
The discovery of The Acrobats in the Mausoleum of the First Qin Emperor by Duan Qingbo in 1999, led to his proposal that Hellenistic art influenced the works of the first Qin Emperor in 210 BCE.

Duan found that the Epang Palace, recorded in histories as a luxurious palace which symbolized Qin Shi Huang's tyranny and greed, was actually never built except for its foundation. In his 2018 book, Qin Mausoleum: A Dust-Laden Empire, he argues that Qin Shi Huang had been vilified by Han dynasty historians such as Sima Qian, who have cemented the emperor's reputation as a cruel and tyrannical ruler.

In 2006, he was appointed leader of the Shaanxi Great Wall Survey Team and spent the next two years surveying 1,900 kilometres (1,200 mi) of the Great Wall in Shaanxi on foot. He subsequently surveyed parts of the Great Wall in neighbouring Gansu province.

In 2009, Duan returned to his alma mater to teach at the School of Cultural Heritage of Northwest University. He served as deputy dean of the school from 2010 to 2014 and as dean from 2017 until his death. He advised 48 graduate students at the university.

Duan authored more than 10 books and about 100 research papers. He received over 10 national, provincial, and ministerial awards.

== Death ==
Duan was diagnosed with kidney cancer and had one of his kidneys surgically removed in 2016. In May 2019, it was discovered that his cancer had metastasized to his lung. He underwent another surgery in July 2019, but died on 13 October 2019 in Xi'an, aged 55. He was survived by his wife Wu Chun (吴春).
