= Taerpo Horserider =

Chinese horserider statuette

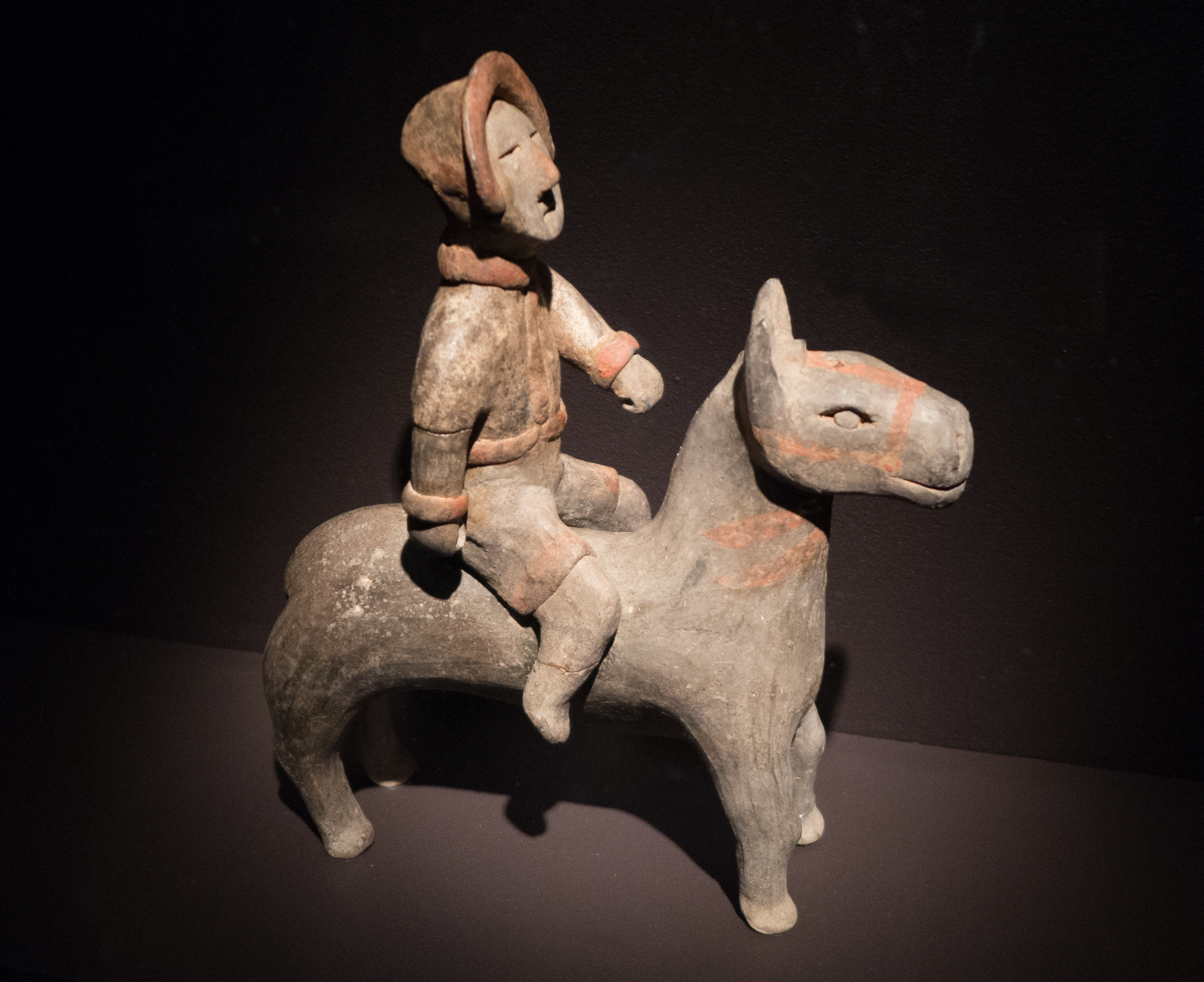
- Material: Terracotta
- Size: 23 cm tall
- Created: 4th–3rd century BCE
- Discovered: Taerpo cemetery, near Xianyang 34.361309°N 108.743223°E
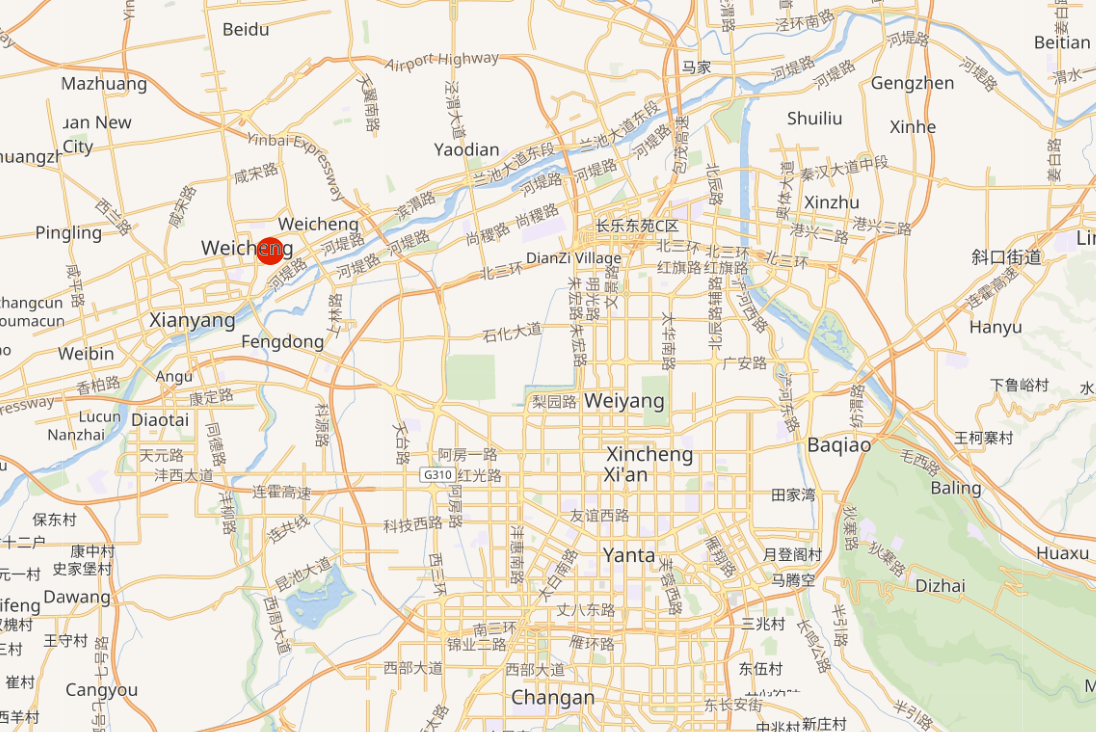
- Present location: Xianyang Museum Taerpo (Continental Asia) Location of Taerpo cemetery (塔兒坡墓) in Xianyang, in the periphery of Xi'an

The Taerpo Horserider is a terracotta figurine dated to the 4th–3rd century BCE from a Qin tomb in the Taerpo cemetery (塔兒坡墓), near Xianyang in Shaanxi. Another nearly-identical statuette is known, from the same tomb. Small holes in his hands suggest that he was originally holding reins in one hand, and a weapon in the other.

This is the earliest known representation of a cavalryman in China. King Zheng of Qin (246–221 BCE) is also known to have employed steppe cavalry men in his army, as seen in the Terracotta Army.

Only red and white are used as colors, as most terracotta statuettes known from the Qin state period.

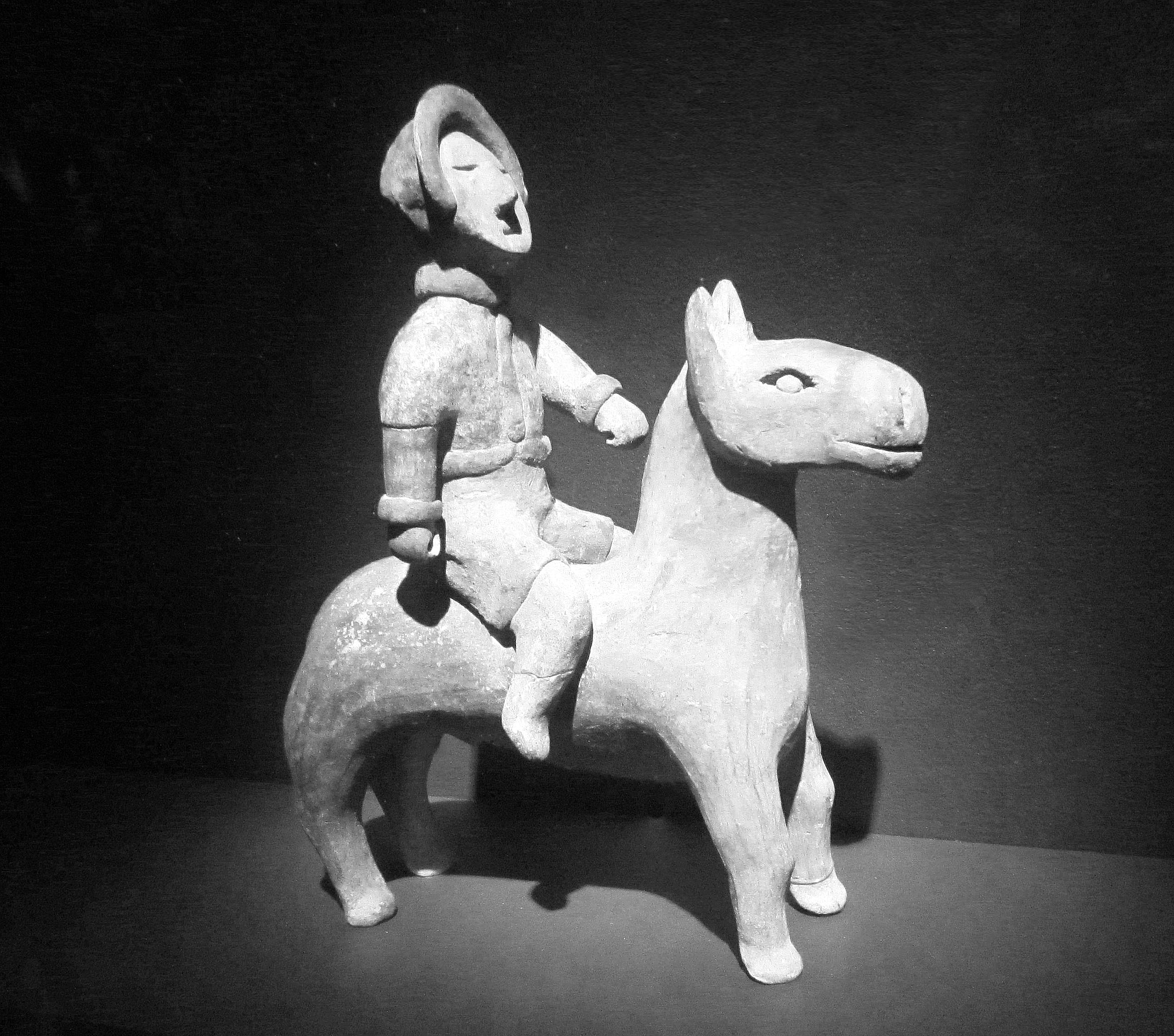
Another view of the statuette

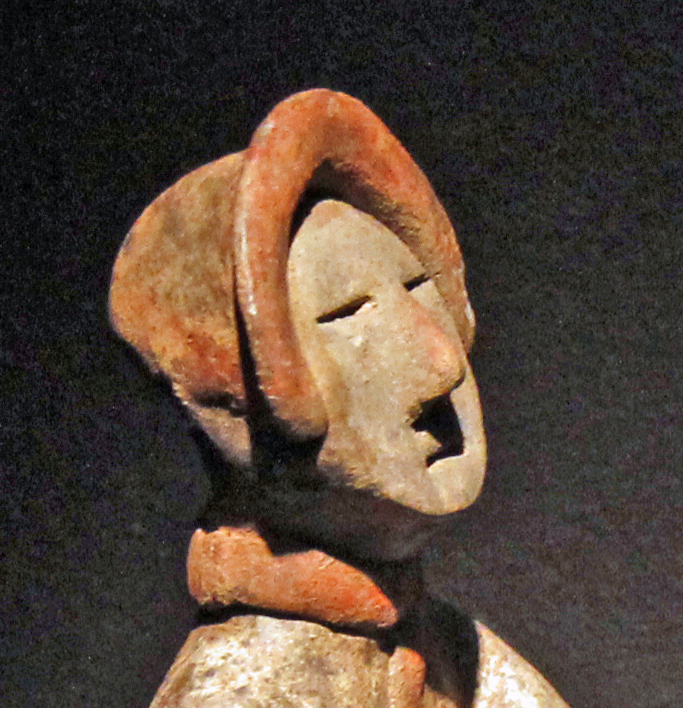
Taerpo horserider (face detail)

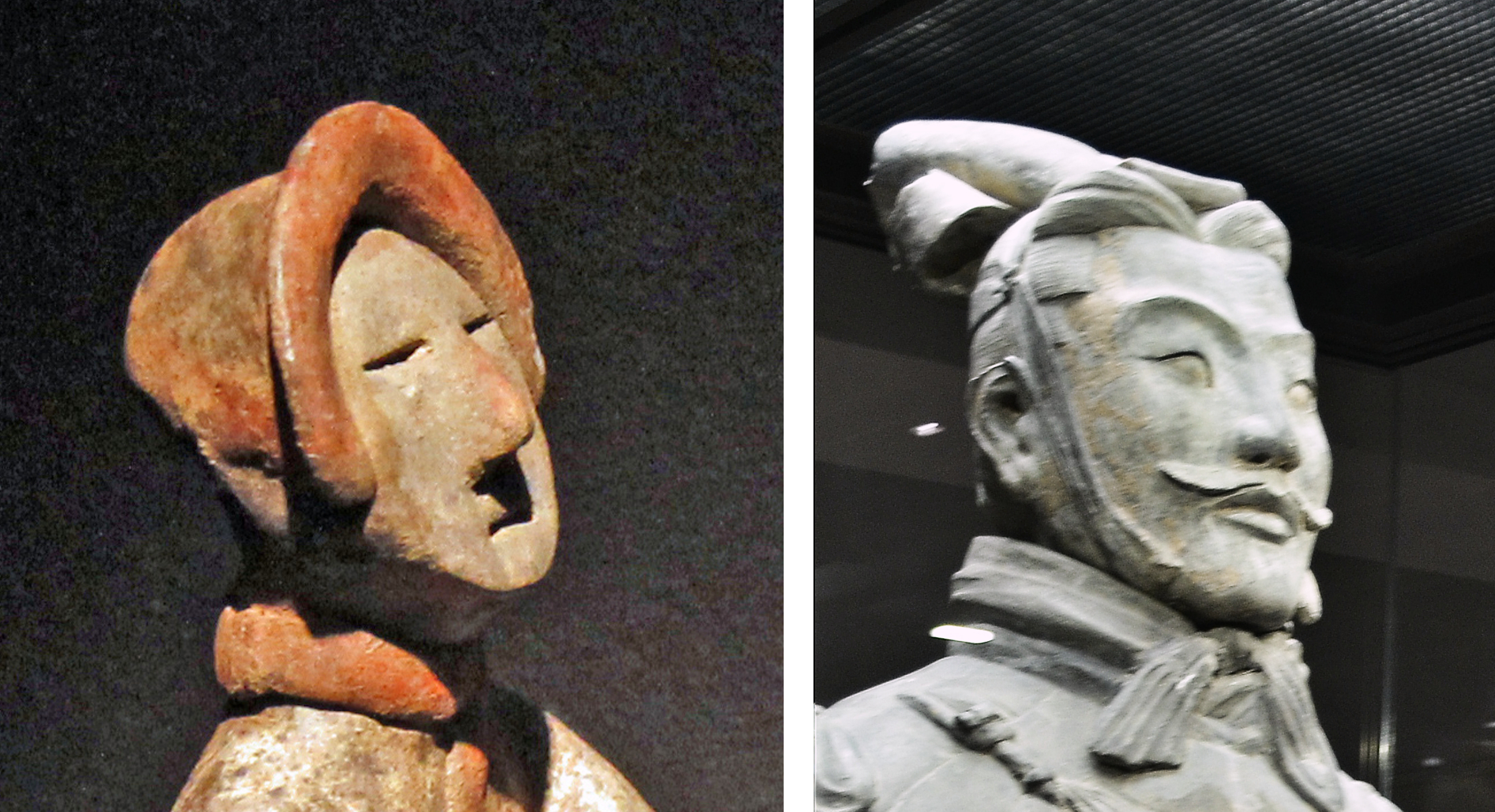
Difference in realism between the Taerpo statuette (4th-3rd century BCE) and the Terracotta Army (210 BCE).

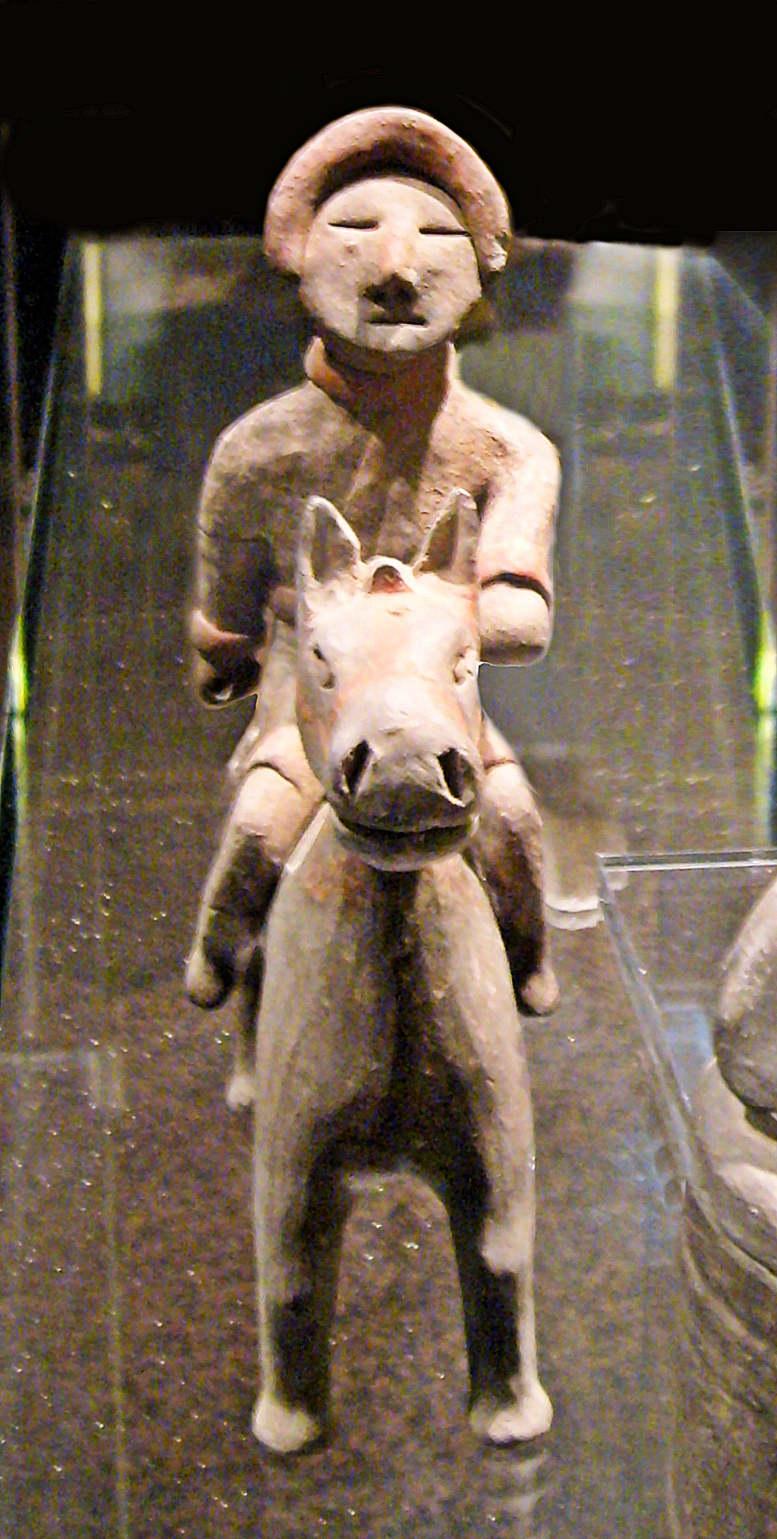
Front view
