= Jingyuan =

Jingyuan may refer to:

- Jingyuan County, Gansu (靖远县)
- Jingyuan County, Ningxia (泾源县)
- Jingyuan mutiny, 783 AD mutiny in Jingyuan during the Tang dynasty
- Chinese cruiser Jingyuan (1886), protected cruiser in the late Qing Dynasty Beiyang Fleet
- Chinese cruiser Jingyuan (1887), armored cruiser in the late Qing Dynasty Beiyang Fleet
