= History of Xi'an =

Xi'an has a rich history dating back to more than 6000 years ago. The below is a detailed discussion on the city's history. See also Xi'an.

== Timeline ==
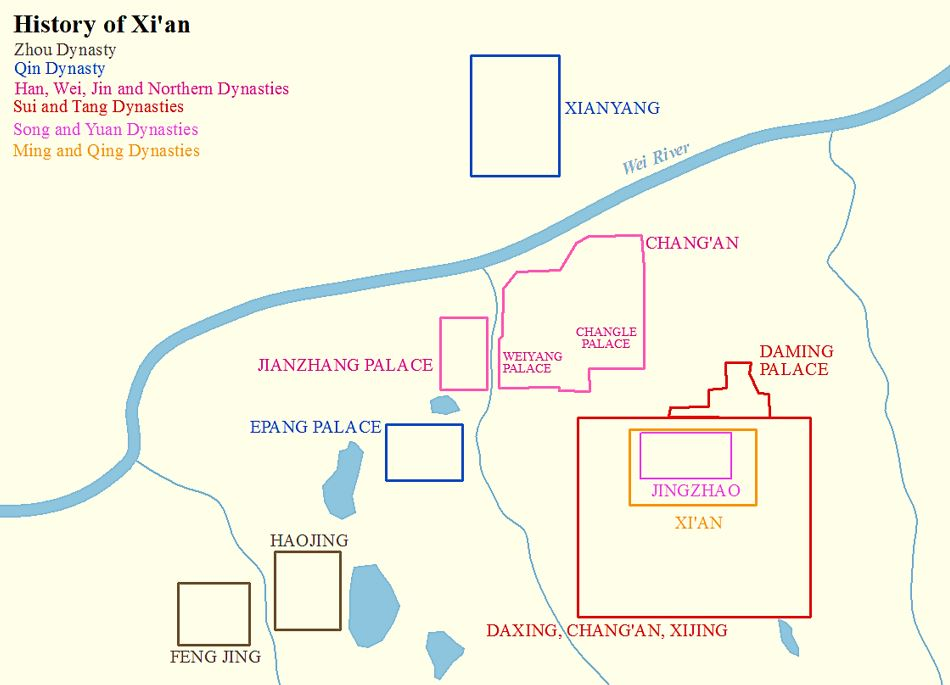
The walls of cities within modern Xi'an from the Zhou to Qing dynasties.

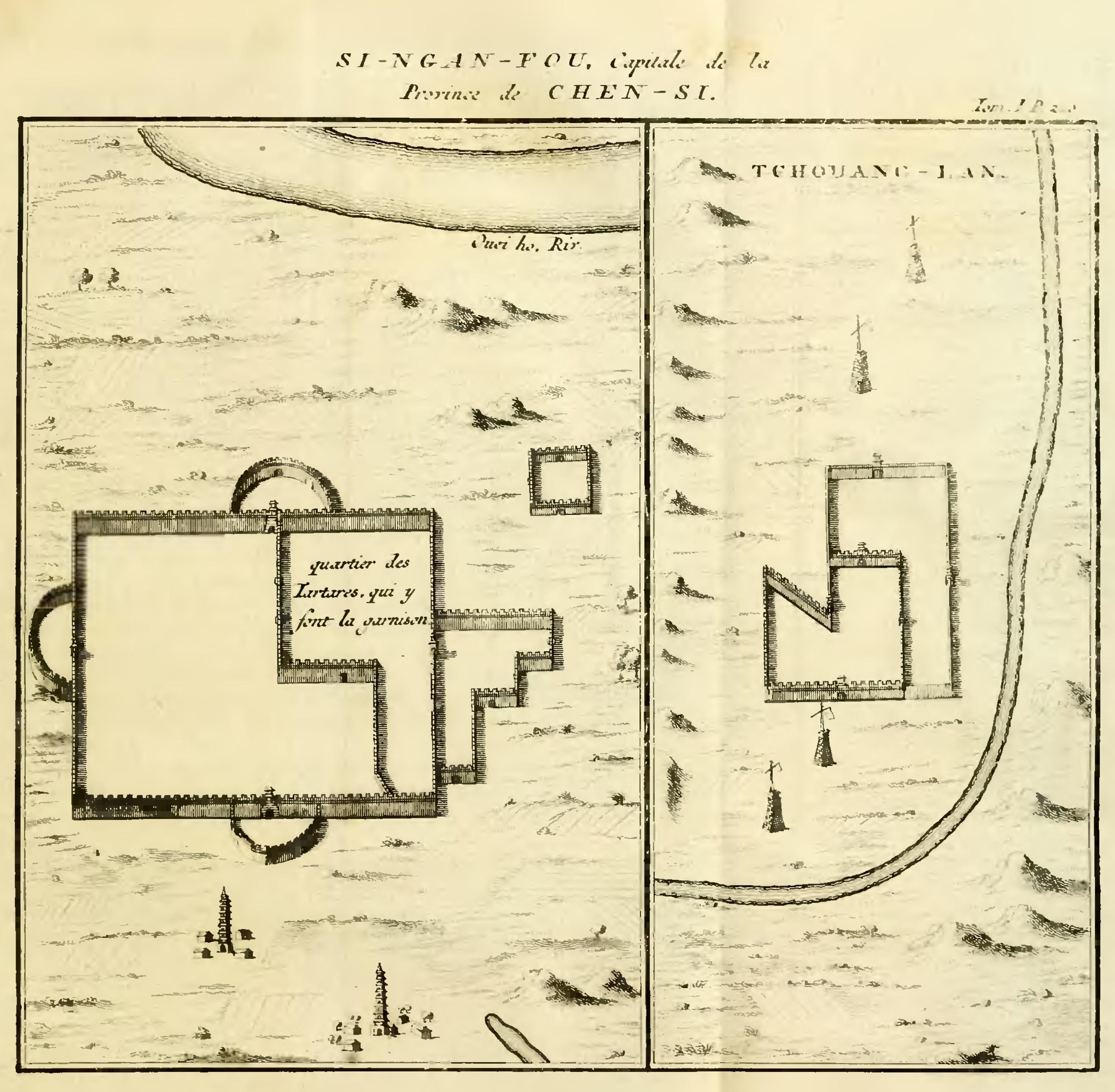
Maps of "Si-ngan-fu" and "Tchouang-lan" from Du Halde's 1736 Description of China, based on Jesuit reports

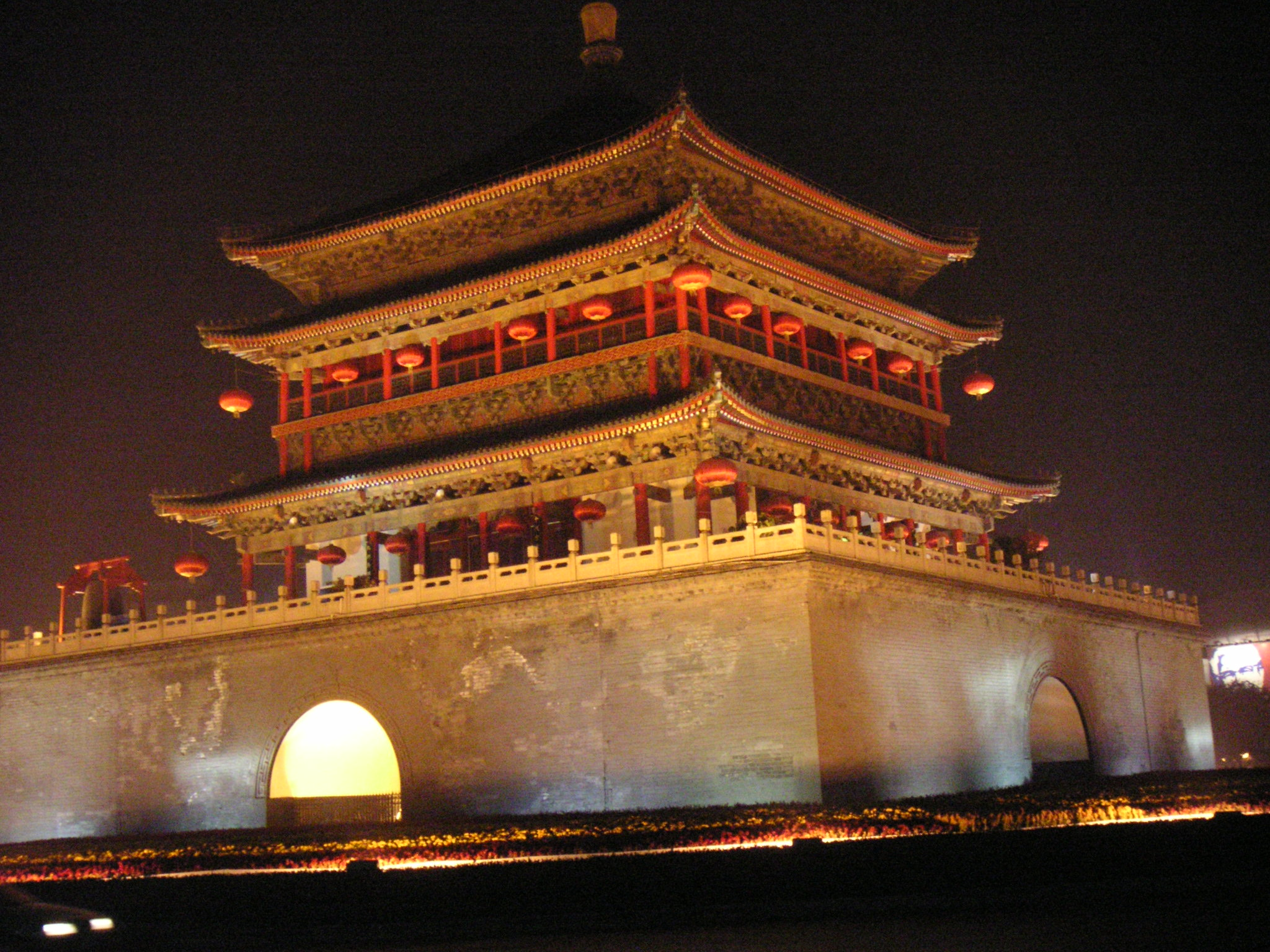
Bell Tower

- Zhou dynasty established its capital in Feng (灃/沣) and Hao (鎬/镐) between the late 11th century BC and 770 BC, both located west of contemporary Xi'an. In 770 BC, the capital was moved to Luoyang due to political unrest.
- The state Qin moved its capital to Xianyang in 350 BC just north of today's Xi'an on the north shore of Wei River.
- Qin dynasty (221–206 BC) constructed its capital in Xianyang. It was burned by Xiang Yu at the end of the dynasty.
- 202 BC: Liu Bang, the founding emperor of the Han dynasty, established Chang'an province as his capital; his first palace Changle Palace (長樂宮/长乐宫) was built across the river from the ruin of the Qin capital. This is traditionally regarded as the founding date of Chang'an and Xi'an.
- 200 BC: Emperor Liu Bang built Weiyang Palace in Chang'an.
- 194 BC: Construction of the first city wall of Chang'an began, which was not finished until 190. The wall measured 25.7 km in length, 12–16 m in thickness at the base. The area within the wall was ca. 36 km^{2}.
- AD 190: The most powerful tyrant of the time, Dong Zhuo, moved his court from Luoyang to Chang'an in a bid to avoid a coalition of powerful warlords going against him.
- 582: Emperor of Sui dynasty ordered a new capital to be built southeast of the Han capital, called Daxing (大興, great excitement). It consisted of three sections: the palace, the imperial city, and the civilian section. The total area within the wall was 84 km^{2}, The main street Zhuque Avenue measured 155 m in width. It was at the time the largest city in the world. The city was renamed Chang'an (長安, Perpetual Peace or Eternal Peace) by the Tang dynasty.
- 7th century: Buddhist monk Xuanzang established a sizeable translation centre after returning from India with Sanskrit scriptures.
- 652: Construction of Great Wild Goose Pagoda began. It measured 64 m in height. This pagoda was constructed for the storage of the translations of Buddhist sutras obtained from India by the monk Xuanzang.
- 707: Construction of Small Wild Goose Pagoda began. It measured 45 m in height. After the earthquake of 1556, its height was reduced to 43.4 m.
- 781: The Nestorian Stele, also known as the Nestorian Stone, Nestorian Monument or Nestorian Tablet, is a stele erected during the Tang dynasty documenting 150 years of early Christianity in China.
- 904: The end of the Tang dynasty brought destruction to Chang'an. Residents were forced to move to Luoyang, the new capital. Only a small area continued to be occupied after the destruction.
- 13th century: Marco Polo said that the people of Xi'an were all idolaters.
- 1370: The Ming dynasty built a new wall to protect a much smaller city of 12 km^{2}. The wall measured 11.9 km in circumference, 12 m in height, and 15–18 m in thickness at the base.
- 1936: Xi'an was the site of the Xi'an Incident during the Second Sino-Japanese War. The Xi'an Incident brought the Chinese Communist Party and Kuomintang into the Second United Front so the two forces could concentrate on fighting against Japan.
- 1949: May 20, 1949: The People's Liberation Army captured the city of Xi'an from the Kuomintang.
