= Mausoleum of Qin Shi Huang =

3rd-century BC site in Shaanxi, China

The Mausoleum of Qin Shi Huang
- 秦始皇陵
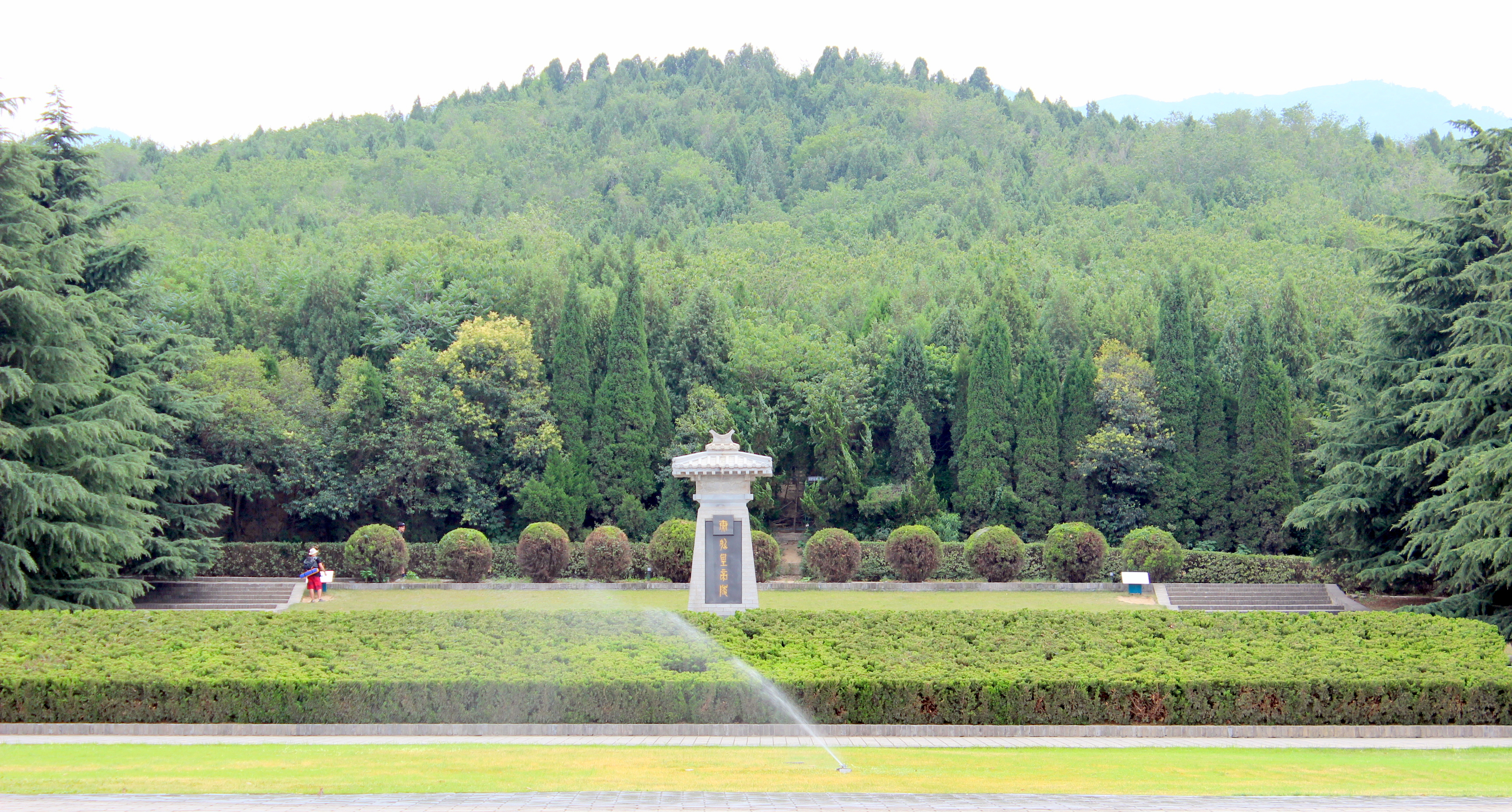

- Location within China

General information
- Location: Lintong District, Xi'an, Shaanxi, China
- Coordinates: 34°22′54″N 109°15′14″E

Website
- bmy.com.cn

UNESCO World Heritage Site
- Official name: Mausoleum of the First Qin Emperor
- Type: Cultural
- Criteria: i, iii, iv, vi
- Designated: 1987 (11th session)
- Reference no.: 441
- Region: Asia-Pacific

The Mausoleum of Qin Shi Huang (Chinese: 秦始皇陵; pinyin: Qínshǐhuáng Líng) is a tomb complex constructed for Qin Shi Huang, the first emperor of the Chinese Qin dynasty. It is located in modern-day Lintong District in Xi'an, Shaanxi. It was constructed over 38 years from 246 to 208 BC, and is situated underneath a 76-metre-tall (249 ft) tomb mound shaped like a truncated pyramid. The layout of the mausoleum is modeled on the layout of Xianyang, the capital of the Qin dynasty, which was divided into inner and outer cities. The circumference of the inner city is 2.5 km (1.6 mi) and the outer is 6.3 km (3.9 mi). The tomb is located in the southwest of the inner city and faces east. The main tomb chamber housing the coffin and burial artifacts is the core of the architectural complex of the mausoleum.

The tomb itself has not yet been excavated. Archaeological explorations currently concentrate on various sites of the extensive necropolis surrounding the tomb, including the Terracotta Army to the east of the tomb mound. The Terracotta Army served as a garrison to the mausoleum and has yet to be completely excavated.

== History ==
=== Historical records ===
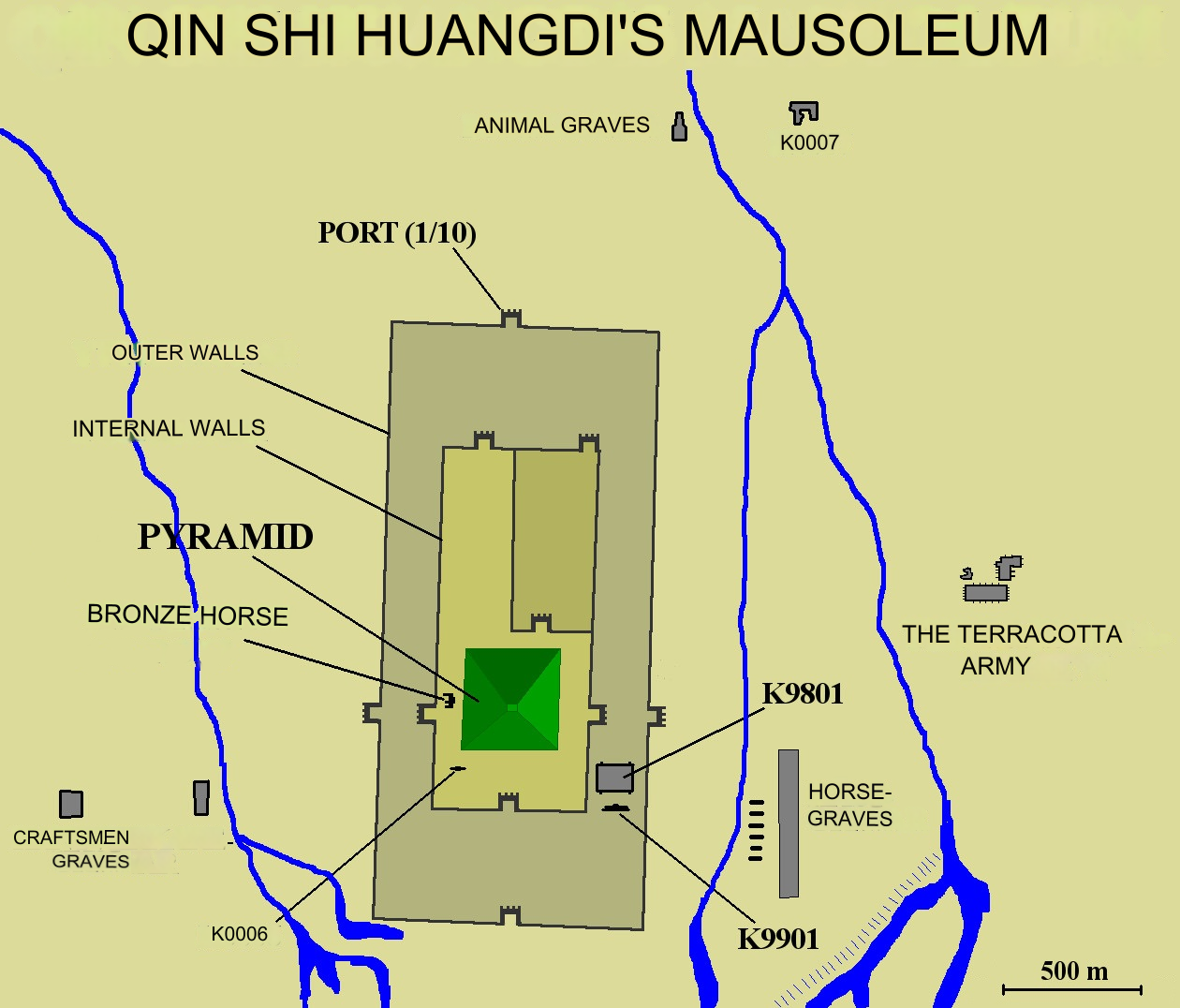
Plan of the Qin Shi Huang Mausoleum. The central tomb itself has yet to be excavated. The Terracotta Army guards the eastern side, about one kilometer from the Mausoleum itself.

Work on the mausoleum began soon after Emperor Qin ascended the throne in 246 BCE when he was still aged 13, although its full-scale construction only started after he had conquered the six other major states and unified China in 221 BCE. It was completed 208 BCE, around 39 years after work started. Geographer Li Daoyuan, writing six centuries after the first emperor's death, recorded in Shui Jing Zhu that Mount Li was chosen as the location for his burial ground due to its auspicious geology: "famed for its jade mines, its northern side was rich in gold, and its southern side rich in beautiful jade; the first emperor, covetous of its fine reputation, therefore chose to be buried there".

An account of the construction of the mausoleum including descriptions of the tomb was given by Sima Qian in chapter six of his Records of the Grand Historian, which was written in first century BCE and contains the biography of Qin Shi Huang:

In the ninth month, the First Emperor was interred at Mount Li. Digging and preparation work at Mount Li began when the First Emperor first came to the throne. Later, after he had unified his empire, 700,000 men were sent there from all over his empire. They dug through three layers of groundwater, and poured in bronze for the outer coffin. Palaces and scenic towers for a hundred officials were constructed, and the tomb was filled with rare artifacts and wonderful treasure. Craftsmen were ordered to make crossbows and arrows primed to shoot at anyone entering the tomb. Mercury was used to simulate the hundred rivers, the Yangtze, Yellow River, and the great sea, and set to flow mechanically. Above were representation of the heavenly constellations, below, the features of the land. Candles were made from fat of "man-fish", which is calculated to burn and not extinguish for a long time. The Second Emperor said: "It would be inappropriate for the concubines of the late emperor who have no sons to be out free", ordered that they should accompany the dead, and a great many died. After the burial, it was suggested that it would be a serious breach if the craftsmen who constructed the mechanical devices and knew of its treasures were to divulge those secrets. Therefore after the funeral ceremonies had completed and the treasures hidden away, the inner passageway was blocked, and the outer gate lowered, immediately trapping all the workers and craftsmen inside. None could escape. Trees and vegetations were then planted on the tomb mound such that it resembled a hill.

— Sima Qian, Shiji, Chapter 6.

Some scholars believe that the claim of having "dug through three layers of groundwater" to be figurative. It is also uncertain what the "man-fish" in the text refers to originally (in modern Chinese it means "mermaid"), interpretation of the term varies from whale to walrus and other aquatic animals.

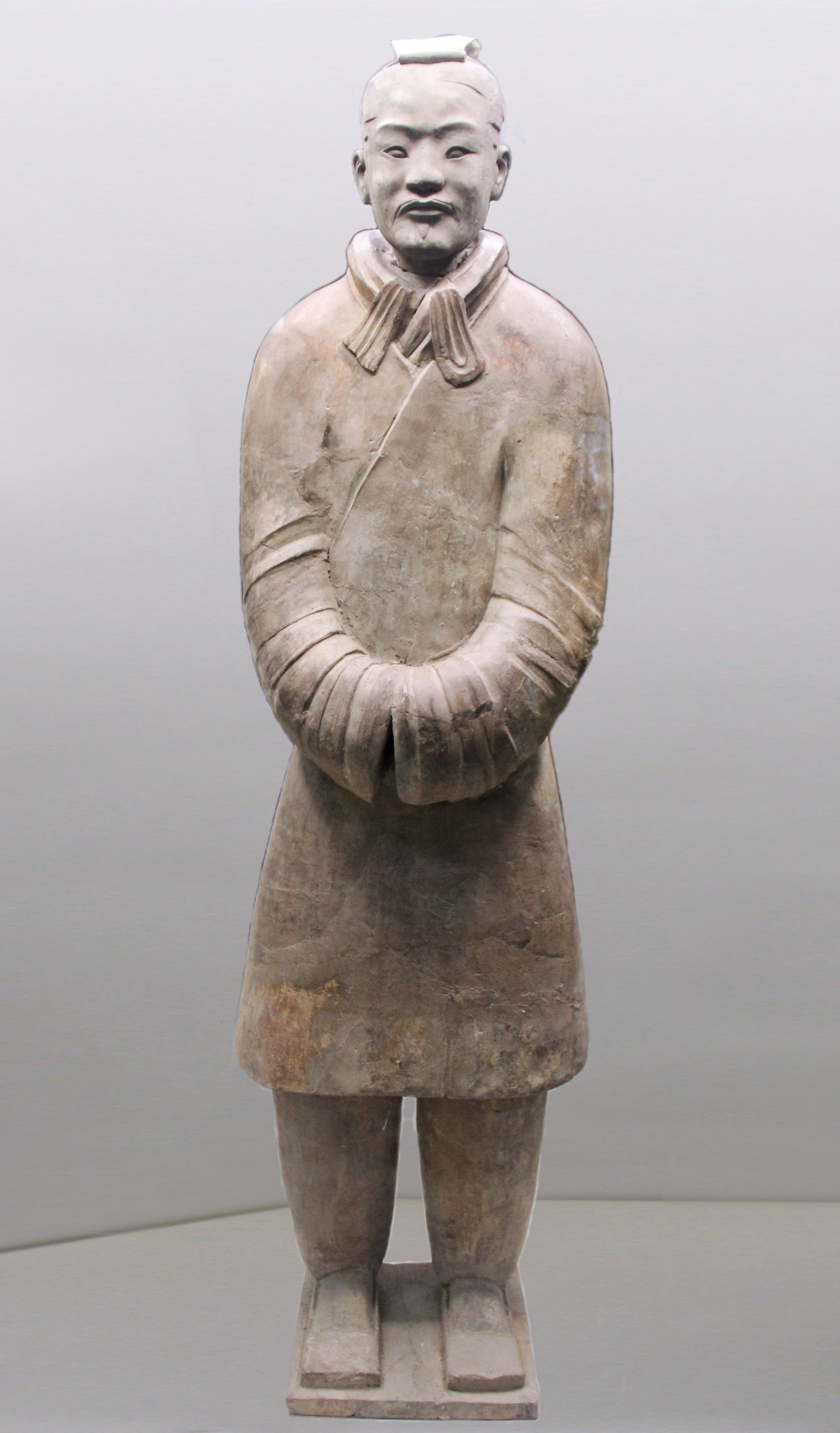
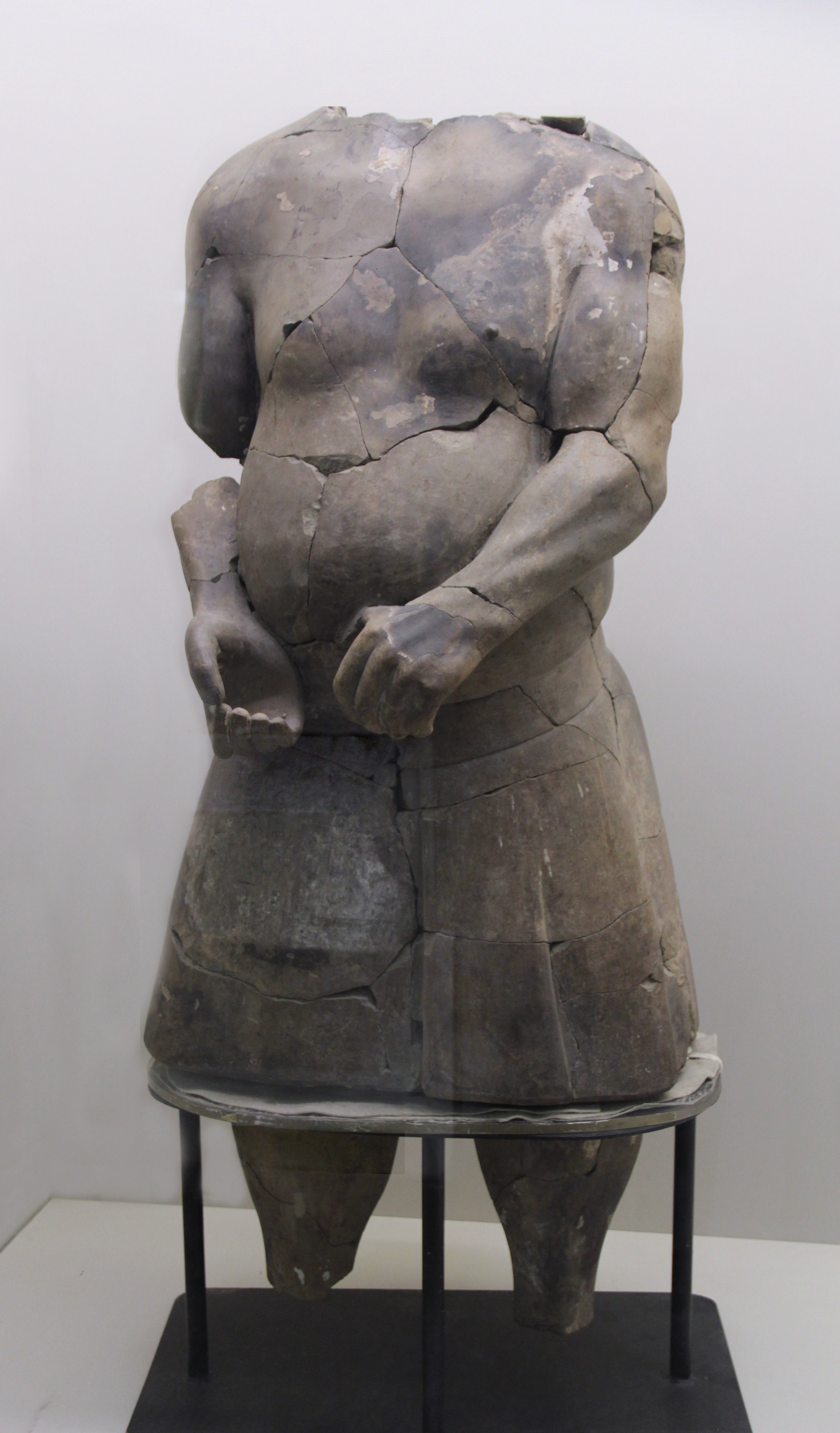
A Terracotta Army attendant, and one of the Acrobats

Before the Mausoleum of the First Qin Emperor was completed, a peasant rebellion broke out during the late Qin dynasty. Zhang Han redeployed all the 700,000 people building the mausoleum to suppress the rebellion, so construction of the mausoleum ceased. After Xiang Yu entered Xianyang, he was said to have looted the tomb. Afterwards, it is said that a shepherd unintentionally burnt down the tomb. The story goes that he went into the dug pit of the mausoleum, dug by Xiang Yu, to look for his sheep with a torch in his hand, and a fire was started, burning away the tomb structures. No solid evidence of the destruction of the tomb has been found, although evidence of fire damage has been found in the pits housing the Terracotta Army. Some scholars think that the mausoleum did not suffer any large-scale destruction.

Some have questioned the veracity of Sima Qian's account. Professor Duan Qingbo, who was the archaeological team leader of the Mausoleum of the First Emperor for more than ten years, stated his belief that Sima Qian's account is fictional and written to persuade Emperor Wu of the Han Dynasty to overhaul the tomb. He believed the project started after the emperor unified the country, and that the construction time lasted from the 28th to the 34th year of the First Emperor reign (219–213 BCE), with the project completed in about seven years. Documents record that the presiding builder was Li Si, who held the office of Prime Minister for a few years before and after the unification of China.

In 1987, the mausoleum, including the Terracotta Army, was listed as a World Heritage Site.

== Discovery of the Terracotta Army ==
General view of the pit No. 1 in the museum of Xi'an.

The first fragments of warriors and bronze arrowheads were discovered by Yang Zhifa, his five brothers, and Wang Puzhi who were digging a well in March 1974 in Xiyang, a village of the Lintong county. At a depth of around two meters, they found hardened dirt, then red earthenware, fragments of terracotta, bronze arrowheads, and terracotta bricks. Yang Zhifa threw the fragments of terracotta in the corner of the field, and collected the arrowheads to sell them to a commercial agency. Other villagers took terracotta bricks to make pillows. A manager in charge of the hydraulic works, Fang Shumiao, saw the objects found and suggested to the villagers that they sell them to the cultural centre of the district. Yang Zhifa received, for two carts of fragments of what would turn out to be terracotta warriors, the amount of 10 yuan. Zhao Kangmin, responsible for the cultural centre, then came to the village and bought everything that the villagers uncovered, as well as re-purchasing the arrowheads sold to the commercial agency. Judging from scientific exploration and local excavations, there are many metal substances in the underground palace, and there is also a good drainage system. As for how deep the underground palace is, there is a lot of controversy in academic circles, with opinions differing from 20 meters to 50 meters. Some scholars believe that the so-called "crossing three springs" is a false figure.

Visual tour of the three main Terracotta Army pits (no audio).

In May 1974, a team of archaeologists from Shaanxi went to the site to undertake the first excavations of what would later be designated Pit 1. In May 1976, Pit 2 was discovered by drilling and in July, Pit 3 was discovered. The excavations over an area of 20,000 square meters produced about 7,000 statues of terracotta warriors and horses, and about a hundred wooden battle chariots and numerous weapons. Large structures have been erected to protect the pits — the first was finished in 1979. A larger necropolis of six hundred pits was uncovered by 2008. Some pits were found a few kilometers away from the mound of the tomb of Emperor Qin Shi Huang.

== Archaeological studies ==
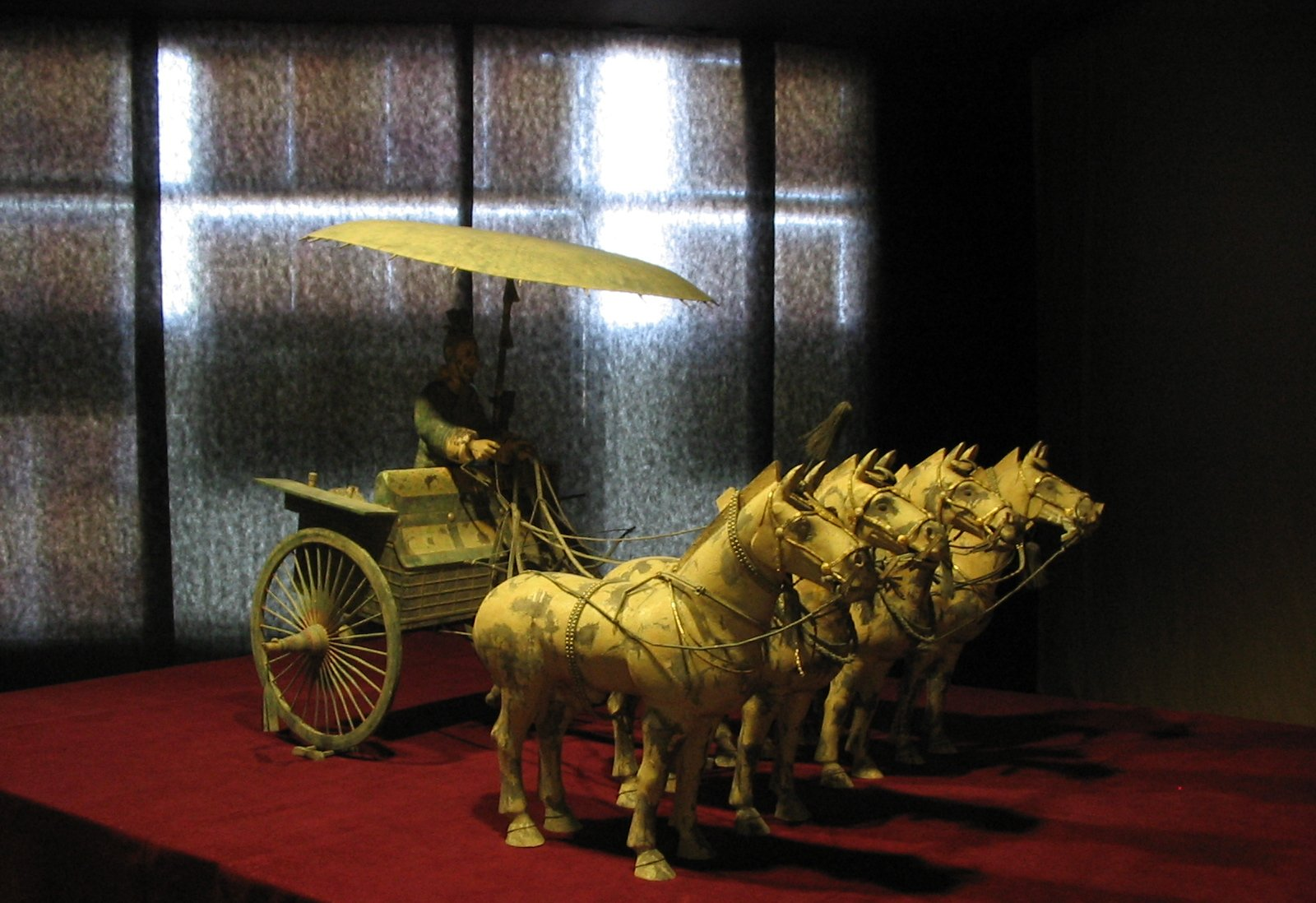
Chariot found outside of the tomb mound.

The necropolis complex of Qin Shi Huang is a microcosm of the Emperor's empire and palace, with the tomb mound at the center. There are two walls, the inner and outer walls, surrounding the tomb mound, and a number of pits containing figures and artifacts were found inside and outside the walls. To the west inside the inner wall were found bronze chariots and horses. Inside the inner wall were also found terracotta figures of courtiers and bureaucrats who served the Emperor. Outside of the inner wall but inside the outer wall, pits with terracotta figures of entertainers and strongmen, as well as a pit containing a stone suit of armour were found. To the north of the outer wall were found the imperial park with bronze cranes, swan, and ducks with groups of musicians. Outside the outer walls were also found imperial stables where real horses were buried with terracotta figures of grooms kneeling beside them. To the west were found mass burial grounds for the labourers forced to build the complex. The Terracotta Army is about 1.5 km east of the tomb mound.

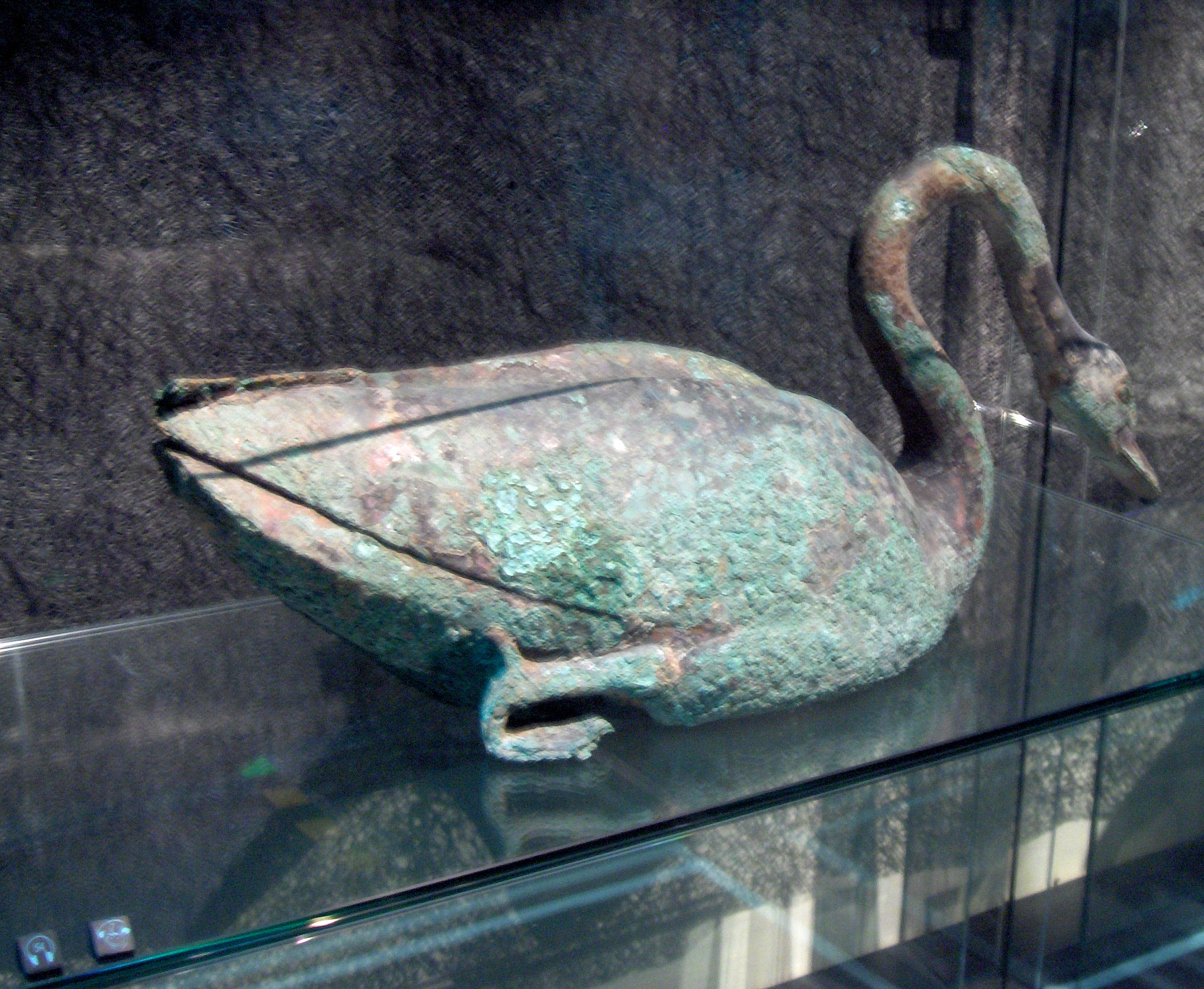
Bronze swan.

The tomb mound itself at present remains largely unexcavated, but a number of techniques were used to explore the site. The underground palace has been located at the center of the mound. Archaeological survey and magnetic anomaly studies indicate a 4-meter high perimeter wall, measuring 460 meters north to south and 390 meters east to west, which is made of bricks and serves as the wall of the underground palace. On top is an enclosing wall made of rammed earth of 30–40 meters in height. There are sloping passageways leading to the four walls. The west tomb passage is linked to a pit where the bronze chariots and horses were found. The tomb chamber itself is 80 meters long east to west, 50 meters north to south, and is about 15 meters high. There are, however, disagreements among the academic community about the depth at which the palace lies, with estimates ranging from 20 meters to 50 meters.

According to the scientific exploration and partial excavation, a significant amount of metal is present in the underground palace which has a very good drainage system. Sima Qian's text indicates that during its construction the tomb may have reached groundwater, and the water table is estimated to be at a depth of 30 meters. An underground dam and drainage system was discovered in 2000 and the tomb appeared not to have been flooded by the groundwater. Anomalously high levels of mercury in the area of the tomb mound have been detected, which gives credence to the Sima Qian's account that mercury was used to simulate waterways and the seas in the Mausoleum of the First Qin Emperor. However, some scholars believe that if the underground palace is excavated, the mercury would quickly volatilize. "A Preliminary Study of Mercury Buried in the Mausoleum of the First Qin Emperor", an article published in Archaeology magazine, Volume 7, says that during the measuring of soil mercury content, one measured point reached 1440 parts per billion; the rest of 53 points reached an average content of around 205 ppb. There is also a claim that the mercury content is actually a result of local industrial pollution. It is reported in "Lintong County Annals" that from 1978 to 1980, according to general investigation on workers involved with benzene, mercury and lead, 1193 people from 21 factories were found poisoned."

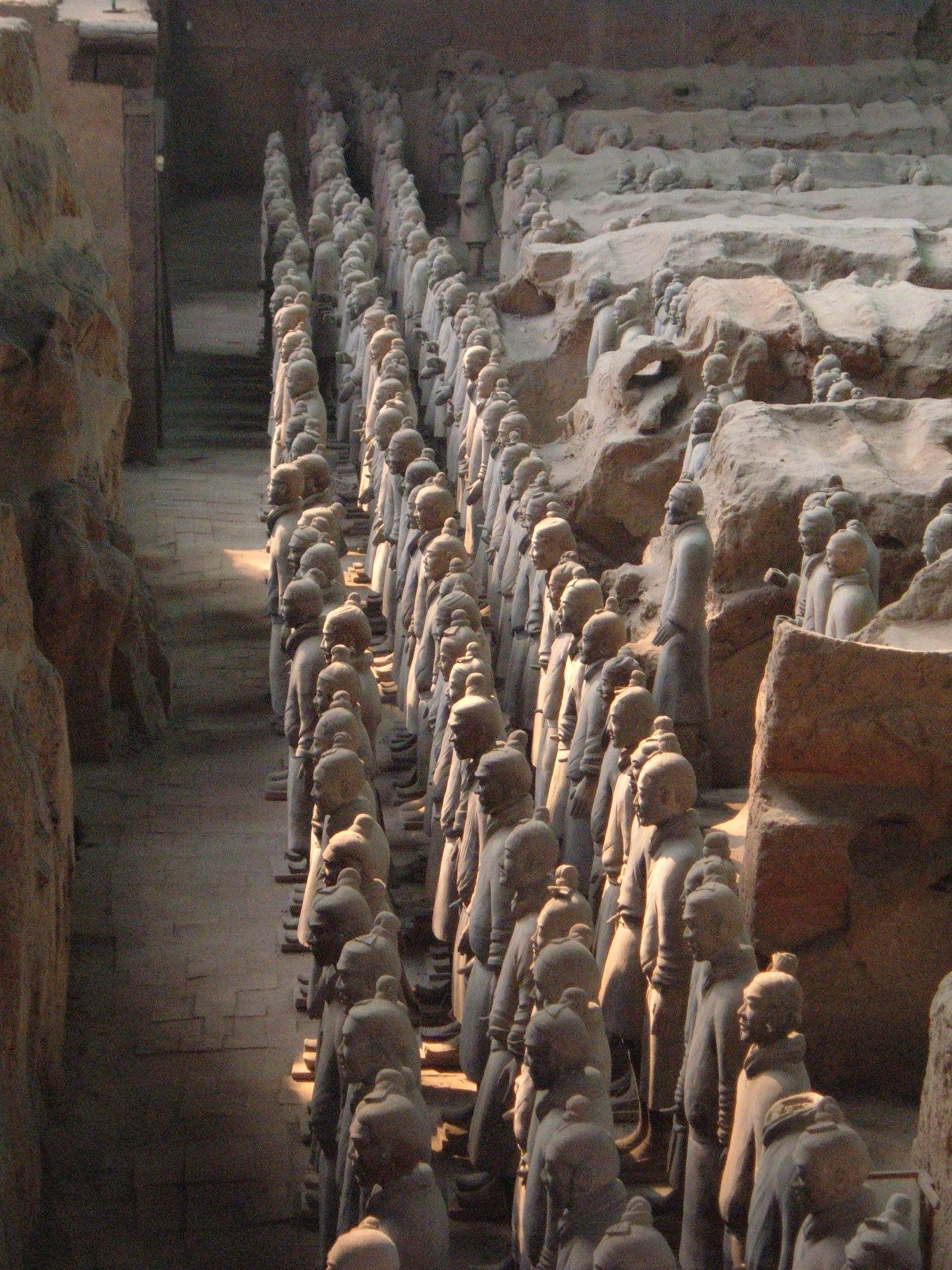
The Terracotta Warriors

Recent studies on the excavated bronze weapons have shown that traces of chromium found on the weapons' surfaces most likely originated from nearby lacquer layers, rather than intentional coating meant as an anti-corrosion treatment. An investigation of hundreds of weapons found that chromium traces were associated with nearby lacquered organic materials such as sword grips and lance shafts, rather than with deliberate metallic coatings. The preservation of many bronzes can be better explained by soil chemistry and alloy composition. Studies done on the microbial community within the protective structures of Pit 1 have identified a significant number of bacteria and fungi that are associated with the deterioration of terracotta surfaces. These findings help create environmental regulations and long-term preservation policies.

In December 2012, it was announced that the remains of an "imperial palace" of great size had been found at the site. Based on its foundations, the courtyard-style palace was estimated to be 690 meters long and 250 meters wide, covering an area of 170,000 square meters, which is nearly a quarter of the size of the Forbidden City in Beijing. The palace included 18 courtyard houses and a main building that overlooked the houses. The archaeologists have been excavating the foundations since 2010 and have found walls, gates, stone roads, pottery shards, and some brickwork.

== Opinions on possible excavation ==
Comparison of approximate profiles of the Mausoleum of Qin Shi Huang with some notable pyramidal or near-pyramidal buildings. Dotted lines indicate original heights, where data is available. In its SVG file, hover over a pyramid to highlight and click for its article.

Beginning in 1976, various scholars proposed to explore the underground palace, citing the following main reasons:

- The Mausoleum of the First Qin Emperor is in a seismic zone, so underground cultural relics need to be unearthed for protection;
- to develop tourism; and
- to prevent grave robbery.

However, opponents of such excavations hold that China's current technology is not able to deal with the large scale of the underground palace yet. For example, in the case of the Terracotta Army, the archaeologists were initially unable to preserve the coat of paint on the surface of terracotta figures, which resulted in the rapid shedding of their painted decoration when exposed to air. The State Administration of Cultural Heritage (SACH) indicated that research and evaluations should be conducted first so as to develop a protection plan for the underground palace, and rejected a proposal by archaeologists to excavate another tomb close by thought to belong to the Emperor's grandson over fears of possible damage to the main mausoleum itself.

== See also ==
- Early and simple domes
