= Jingyuan mutiny =

In 783, Yáo Lìngyán (姚令言), jiedushi of Jingyuan, and his 5,000 troops arrived in Chang'an (Xi'an, Shaanxi) on their way to fight Lǐ Xīliè (李希烈) in Henan. The troops mutinied in reaction to the poor treatment they had received, forcing Tang Dezong to flee Chang'an. After installing Zhu Ci (朱泚), an ousted general, as emperor, the rebels were defeated by Lǐ Shèng (李晟) in 784.
