= Weiyang Palace =

UNESCO World Heritage Site
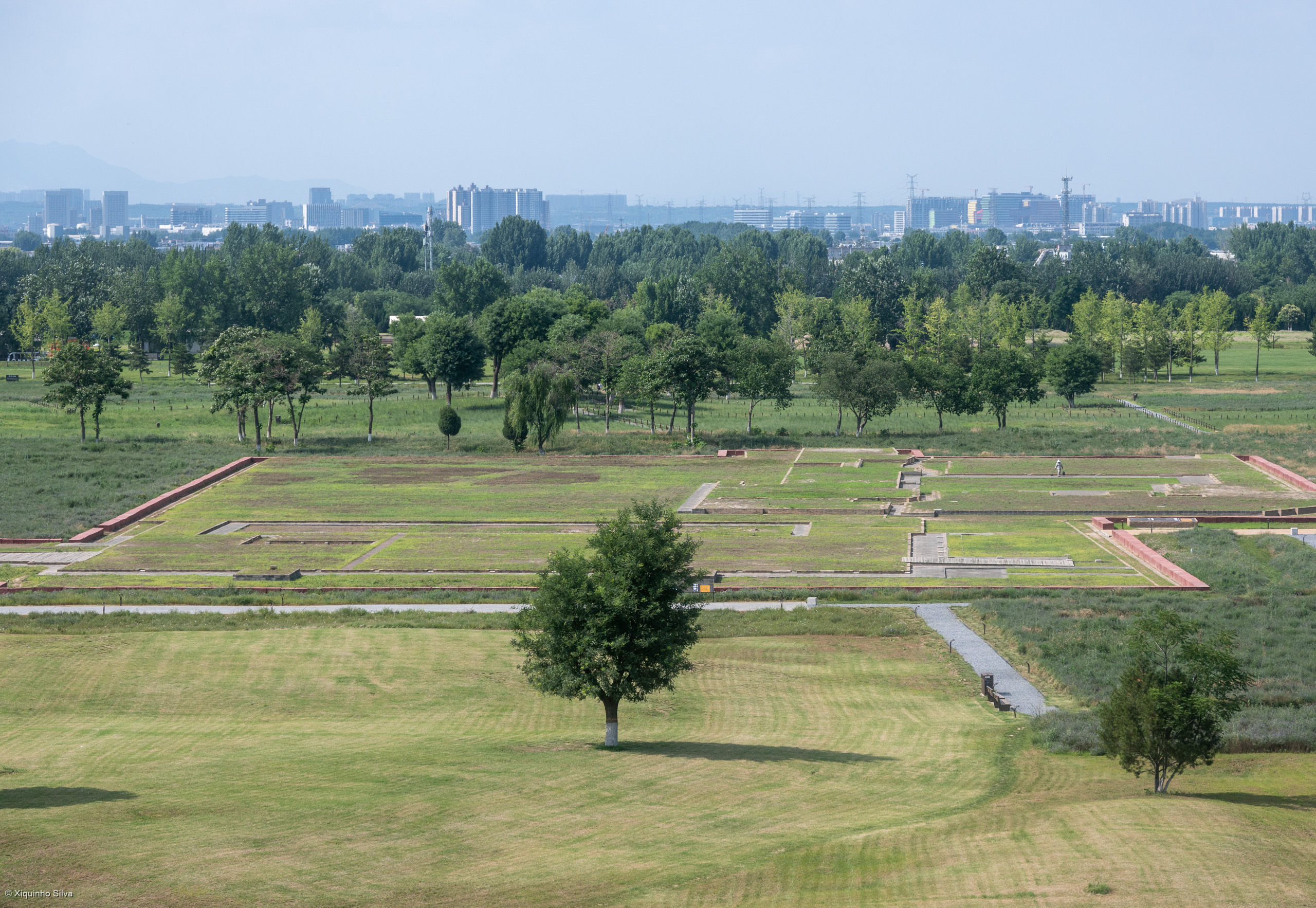
- Historic site of Weiyang Palace

- Location within China
- Official name: Site of Weiyang Palace in Chang'an City of the Western Han dynasty
- Location: Xi'an, Shaanxi, China
- Part of: Silk Roads: the Routes Network of Chang'an-Tianshan Corridor
- Criteria: Cultural: ii, iii, iv, vi
- Reference: 1442-001
- Inscription: 2014 (38th Session)
- Area: 611.09 ha (2.3594 sq mi)
- Buffer zone: 5,422.02 ha (20.9345 sq mi)
- Coordinates: 34°18′16″N 108°51′26″E

Weiyang Palace
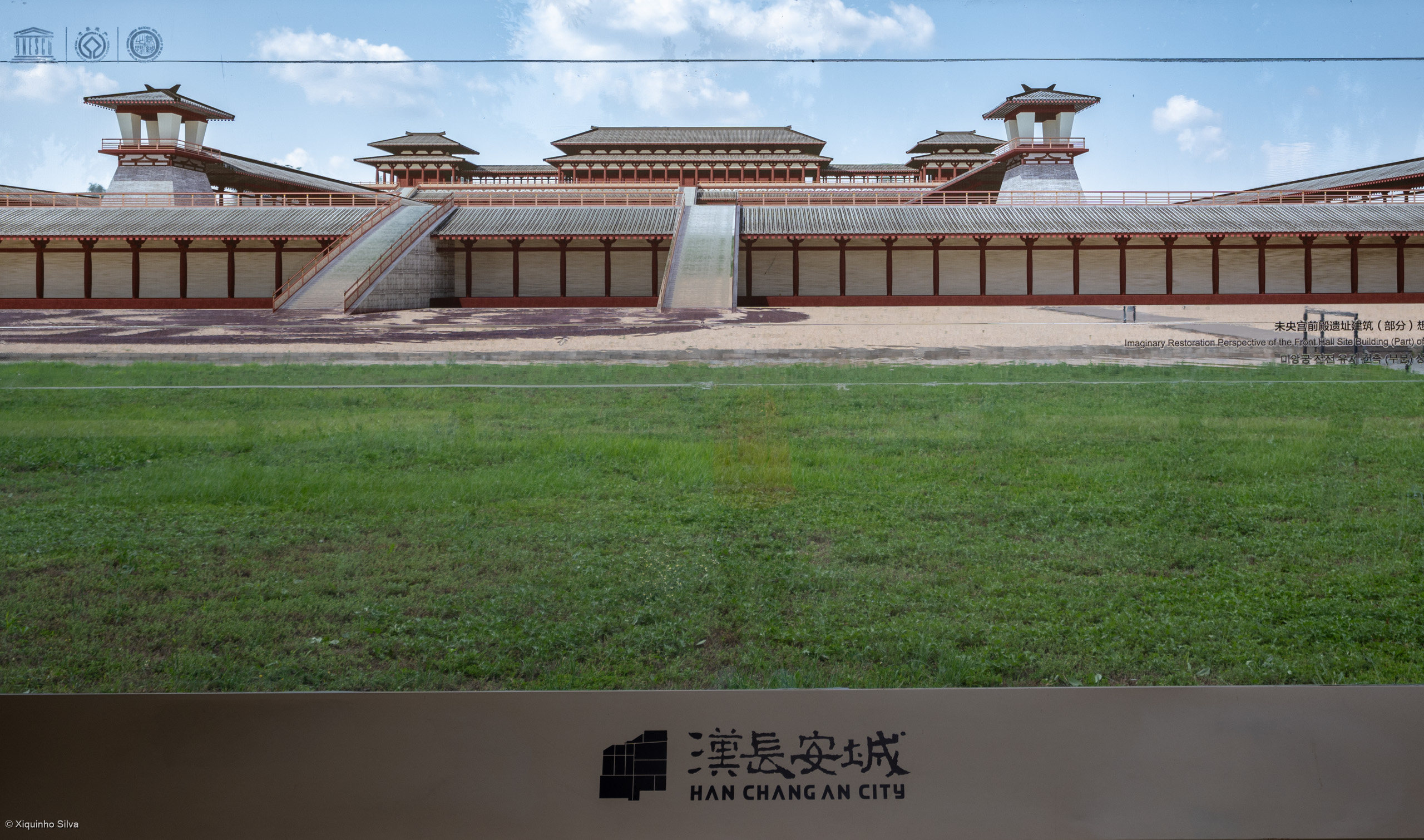
- Visual recreation of Weiyang Palace.
- Chinese: 未央宮
- Literal meaning: The Endless Palace
Transcriptions
Standard Mandarin
- Hanyu Pinyin: Wèiyānggōng
- Bopomofo: ㄨㄟˋ ㄧㄤ ㄍㄨㄥ
- Wade–Giles: Wei^{4}-yang^{1}-kung^{1}
- IPA: [wêɪ.jáŋ.kʊ́ŋ]
Yue: Cantonese
- Yale Romanization: Meihyēunggūng
- Jyutping: mei6 joeng1 gung1
- IPA: [mej˨.jœŋ˥.kʊŋ˥]

The Weiyang Palace (Chinese: 未央宮) was the principal imperial palace of the Western Han dynasty in Chang'an, now Xi'an, China. Emperor Gaozu of Han ordered its construction in 200 BC under the supervision of chancellor Xiao He. The complex contained audience halls, government offices, residential quarters, gardens, and ritual spaces, and served as the political centre of the Western Han empire.

Later dynasties continued to use or rebuild parts of the palace, including the Xin, Eastern Han, Western Jin, Former Zhao, Former Qin, Later Qin, Western Wei, Northern Zhou, and early Sui. The walled compound covered about 4.8 km^{2} (1.9 sq mi). This made it one of the largest palace complexes known from ancient China. Its scale and long administrative use preserve evidence for the development of imperial capitals and court government from the Han period onward.

The surviving site consists mainly of rammed-earth foundations, including the remains of the Front Hall, government offices, gates, and palace walls. It is protected within the Han Chang'an City archaeological park and was inscribed in 2014 as a component of the UNESCO World Heritage Site Silk Roads: the Routes Network of Chang'an-Tianshan Corridor. The archaeological park allows visitors to see the palace platforms and the relationship between Weiyang Palace and the wider Han capital.

== Name ==
"Weiyang" (未央) literally means "(something) hasn't reached its midpoint", "has more than a half to go", but colloquially it can be translated as "endless", which is probably what the name is actually alluding to. Together with the name of Changle Palace (長樂宮, perpetual happiness), which was built 2 years before, it can be interpreted to mean, "The perpetual happiness hasn't reached its midpoint yet."

== Description ==
Weiyang palace was sited to the southwest of Han dynasty Chang'an and is therefore also called the Western Palace (西宫). Surrounded by walls, the palace complex was rectangular, with a length of 2,150 metres east–west and 2,250 metres north–south. Each side of the walls had a single main gate, with the eastern and northern gates (facing Chang'an city) built with gate towers.

Major architectures within the palace include:

- Front Hall (前殿)
- Xuanshi Hall (宣室殿)
- Wenshi Hall (温室殿)
- Qingliang Hall (清凉殿)
- Jinhua Hall (金华殿)
- Chengming Hall (承明殿)
- Gaomen Hall (高门殿)
- Baihu Hall (白虎殿)
- Yutang Hall (玉堂殿)
- Xuande Hall (宣德殿)
- Jiaofang Hall (椒房殿)
- Zhaoyang Hall (昭阳殿)
- Bailiang Platform (柏梁台)
- Qilin Pavilion (麒麟阁)
- Tianlu Pavilion (天禄阁)
- Shiqu Pavilion (石渠阁)
