= Yang Zhifa =

Discoverer of the Terracotta Army statues

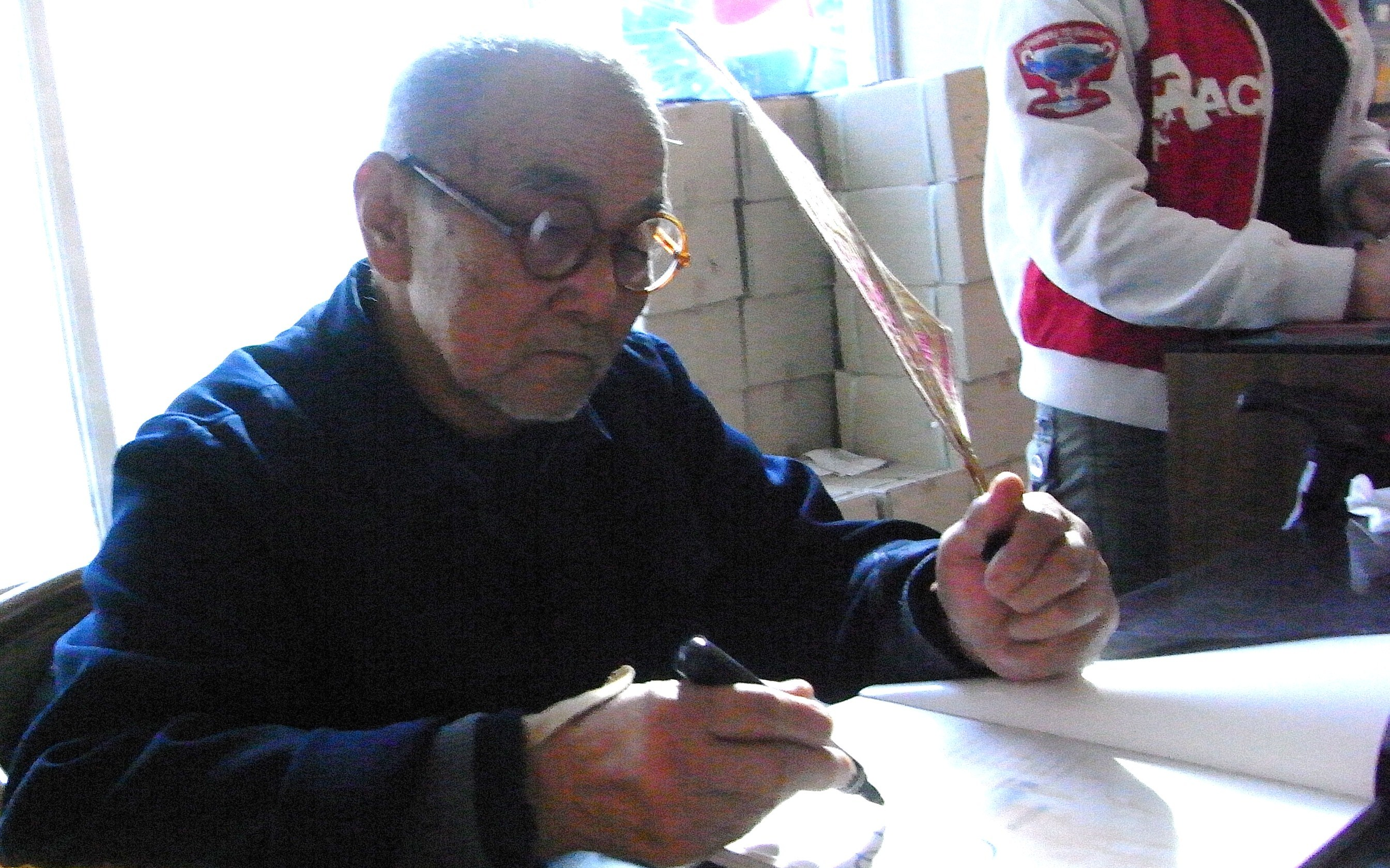
Yang Zhifa in 2008

Yang Zhifa (杨志发, born 1933) is one of the discoverers of the Terracotta Army. For many years, he worked in a small souvenir shop within the museum of the Mausoleum of the First Qin Emperor, where he was signing books sold to the tourists.

== Biography ==
=== Discovery ===
On 23 March 1974, Yang Zhifa, 41 years old, living in Xiyang, a village of the Lintong county 35 kilometers (22 miles) east from the city of Xi'an, decided, in the middle of a drought, to dig a well with his five brothers — Yang Wenhai, Yang Yanxin, Yang Quanyi, Yang Peiyan and Yang Xinman — and Wang Puzhi to water their crops. They chose a small wooded area south of their village; five days later, the well reached 15 metres (49 ft) in depth and, bringing up dirt, Zhifa found a terracotta head and a bronze arrowhead.

=== Rewards ===
Immediately, he informed authorities of his discovery; they dispatched a team of archeologists to the site. The government offered him 300 yuan as a reward, equivalent to his annual salary. He was then evicted from his 167 square meters (1800 sq. ft.) of property with the other villagers for archeologic and touristic needs, but was granted land in Qinyong, a neighboring village. When the site became accessible to the public, he was hired by the museum, in which he signed books in a souvenir shop, six days a week, from 9 am to 5 pm, for a salary of CNY 300 per month, which increased to CNY 1000 after retirement.

- Asteroid 267017 Yangzhifa, discovered by Italian amateur astronomer Silvano Casulli in 1995, was named in his honor. The official naming citation was published by the Minor Planet Center on 5 October 2017 (M.P.C. 106504).
