= List of minor planets: 267001–268000 =

The following is a partial list of minor planets, running from minor-planet number 267001 through 268000, inclusive. The primary data for this and other partial lists is based on JPL's "Small-Body Orbital Elements" and data available from the Minor Planet Center. Critical list information is also provided by the MPC, unless otherwise specified from Lowell Observatory. A detailed description of the table's columns and additional sources are given on the main page including a complete list of every page in this series, and a statistical break-up on the dynamical classification of minor planets.

Also see the summary list of all named bodies in numerical and alphabetical order, and the corresponding naming citations for the number range of this particular list. New namings may only be added to this list after official publication, as the preannouncement of names is condemned by the Working Group for Small Bodies Nomenclature of the International Astronomical Union.

Near-Earth obj.	MBA (inner)	MBA (outer)	Centaur
Mars-crosser	MBA (middle)	Jupiter trojan	Trans-Neptunian obj.
Unclassified

== 267001–267100 ==
Designation			Discovery			Properties		Ref
Permanent	Provisional	Named after	Date	Site	Discoverer(s)	Category	Diam.	Ref
267001	1094 T-3	—	October 17, 1977	Palomar	C. J. van Houten, I. van Houten-Groeneveld, T. Gehrels	·	3.7 km	MPC · JPL
267002	3807 T-3	—	October 16, 1977	Palomar	C. J. van Houten, I. van Houten-Groeneveld, T. Gehrels	·	1.5 km	MPC · JPL
267003 Burkert	1978 PF	Burkert	August 10, 1978	La Silla	L. D. Schmadel	T_{j} (2.97)	4.0 km	MPC · JPL
267004	1981 UA	—	October 21, 1981	Palomar	R. S. Dunbar	·	2.3 km	MPC · JPL
267005	1992 RN_{5}	—	September 2, 1992	La Silla	E. W. Elst	·	2.0 km	MPC · JPL
267006	1993 BR_{11}	—	January 22, 1993	Kitt Peak	Spacewatch	·	1.1 km	MPC · JPL
267007	1993 FD_{14}	—	March 17, 1993	La Silla	UESAC	·	2.4 km	MPC · JPL
267008	1993 FS_{62}	—	March 19, 1993	La Silla	UESAC	NYS	1.3 km	MPC · JPL
267009	1993 TN_{7}	—	October 9, 1993	Kitt Peak	Spacewatch	(5)	1.4 km	MPC · JPL
267010	1994 CX_{4}	—	February 11, 1994	Kitt Peak	Spacewatch	·	1.4 km	MPC · JPL
267011	1994 PQ_{26}	—	August 12, 1994	La Silla	E. W. Elst	·	1.5 km	MPC · JPL
267012	1994 RM_{26}	—	September 3, 1994	La Silla	E. W. Elst	·	1.2 km	MPC · JPL
267013	1995 SW_{14}	—	September 18, 1995	Kitt Peak	Spacewatch	·	2.3 km	MPC · JPL
267014	1995 SY_{40}	—	September 25, 1995	Kitt Peak	Spacewatch	·	1.1 km	MPC · JPL
267015	1995 SL_{62}	—	September 25, 1995	Kitt Peak	Spacewatch	CYB	4.7 km	MPC · JPL
267016	1995 SP_{65}	—	September 26, 1995	Kitt Peak	Spacewatch	(2076)	990 m	MPC · JPL
267017 Yangzhifa	1995 UA	Yangzhifa	October 16, 1995	Colleverde	V. S. Casulli	·	1.1 km	MPC · JPL
267018	1995 UL_{2}	—	October 24, 1995	Kleť	Kleť	V	870 m	MPC · JPL
267019	1995 VB_{4}	—	November 14, 1995	Kitt Peak	Spacewatch	·	1.0 km	MPC · JPL
267020	1995 VB_{11}	—	November 15, 1995	Kitt Peak	Spacewatch	·	930 m	MPC · JPL
267021	1995 VC_{11}	—	November 15, 1995	Kitt Peak	Spacewatch	·	1.4 km	MPC · JPL
267022	1995 WX_{26}	—	November 17, 1995	Kitt Peak	Spacewatch	·	3.2 km	MPC · JPL
267023	1995 WF_{31}	—	November 19, 1995	Kitt Peak	Spacewatch	·	1.3 km	MPC · JPL
267024	1995 XK_{3}	—	December 14, 1995	Kitt Peak	Spacewatch	·	1.1 km	MPC · JPL
267025	1995 XL_{3}	—	December 14, 1995	Kitt Peak	Spacewatch	·	2.6 km	MPC · JPL
267026	1996 ED_{7}	—	March 11, 1996	Kitt Peak	Spacewatch	MAS	890 m	MPC · JPL
267027	1996 RN_{8}	—	September 6, 1996	Kitt Peak	Spacewatch	·	4.8 km	MPC · JPL
267028	1996 RF_{19}	—	September 15, 1996	Kitt Peak	Spacewatch	·	3.5 km	MPC · JPL
267029	1996 TT_{27}	—	October 7, 1996	Kitt Peak	Spacewatch	·	760 m	MPC · JPL
267030	1996 TV_{40}	—	October 8, 1996	La Silla	E. W. Elst	·	1.6 km	MPC · JPL
267031	1996 TZ_{50}	—	October 5, 1996	La Silla	E. W. Elst	·	830 m	MPC · JPL
267032	1996 TC_{60}	—	October 3, 1996	La Silla	E. W. Elst	·	2.0 km	MPC · JPL
267033	1996 VW_{35}	—	November 9, 1996	Kitt Peak	Spacewatch	WIT	1.2 km	MPC · JPL
267034	1997 AC_{25}	—	January 12, 1997	Caussols	ODAS	·	3.3 km	MPC · JPL
267035	1997 EB_{10}	—	March 3, 1997	Kitt Peak	Spacewatch	·	910 m	MPC · JPL
267036	1997 SC_{11}	—	September 27, 1997	Rand	G. R. Viscome	·	970 m	MPC · JPL
267037	1997 YG	—	December 18, 1997	Oizumi	T. Kobayashi	·	1.8 km	MPC · JPL
267038	1997 YM_{2}	—	December 21, 1997	Oizumi	T. Kobayashi	·	1.5 km	MPC · JPL
267039	1998 DF_{18}	—	February 23, 1998	Kitt Peak	Spacewatch	·	890 m	MPC · JPL
267040	1998 FW	—	March 18, 1998	Kitt Peak	Spacewatch	·	1.9 km	MPC · JPL
267041	1998 FL_{143}	—	March 29, 1998	Socorro	LINEAR	JUN	1.4 km	MPC · JPL
267042	1998 GA_{10}	—	April 2, 1998	Socorro	LINEAR	·	4.4 km	MPC · JPL
267043	1998 HQ_{10}	—	April 17, 1998	Kitt Peak	Spacewatch	·	2.8 km	MPC · JPL
267044	1998 HN_{118}	—	April 23, 1998	Socorro	LINEAR	·	2.4 km	MPC · JPL
267045	1998 QK_{49}	—	August 17, 1998	Socorro	LINEAR	·	2.4 km	MPC · JPL
267046	1998 RU_{17}	—	September 14, 1998	Socorro	LINEAR	·	1.1 km	MPC · JPL
267047	1998 RK_{40}	—	September 14, 1998	Socorro	LINEAR	·	1.4 km	MPC · JPL
267048	1998 RX_{46}	—	September 14, 1998	Socorro	LINEAR	·	1.4 km	MPC · JPL
267049	1998 RE_{49}	—	September 14, 1998	Socorro	LINEAR	·	2.5 km	MPC · JPL
267050	1998 SG_{3}	—	September 17, 1998	Caussols	ODAS	EOS	2.9 km	MPC · JPL
267051	1998 SA_{27}	—	September 20, 1998	Xinglong	SCAP	·	3.6 km	MPC · JPL
267052	1998 SD_{95}	—	September 26, 1998	Socorro	LINEAR	·	1.3 km	MPC · JPL
267053	1998 SD_{98}	—	September 26, 1998	Socorro	LINEAR	·	4.7 km	MPC · JPL
267054	1998 SL_{152}	—	September 26, 1998	Socorro	LINEAR	NYS	1.6 km	MPC · JPL
267055	1998 SR_{153}	—	September 26, 1998	Socorro	LINEAR	·	2.9 km	MPC · JPL
267056	1998 UX_{39}	—	October 28, 1998	Socorro	LINEAR	·	6.3 km	MPC · JPL
267057	1998 VL_{41}	—	November 14, 1998	Kitt Peak	Spacewatch	NYS	1.4 km	MPC · JPL
267058	1998 VR_{48}	—	November 15, 1998	Kitt Peak	Spacewatch	THM	3.3 km	MPC · JPL
267059	1998 WK_{25}	—	November 16, 1998	Kitt Peak	Spacewatch	·	4.8 km	MPC · JPL
267060	1998 WH_{42}	—	November 19, 1998	Caussols	ODAS	·	1.7 km	MPC · JPL
267061	1998 WD_{44}	—	November 19, 1998	Caussols	ODAS	·	940 m	MPC · JPL
267062	1998 YH_{5}	—	December 20, 1998	Catalina	CSS	T_{j} (2.97) · EUP	6.5 km	MPC · JPL
267063	1999 FC_{77}	—	March 20, 1999	Apache Point	SDSS	·	1.4 km	MPC · JPL
267064	1999 FU_{83}	—	March 20, 1999	Apache Point	SDSS	·	1.6 km	MPC · JPL
267065	1999 RS_{7}	—	September 3, 1999	Kitt Peak	Spacewatch	JUN	1.5 km	MPC · JPL
267066	1999 RR_{30}	—	September 8, 1999	Socorro	LINEAR	PHO	1.3 km	MPC · JPL
267067	1999 RY_{56}	—	September 7, 1999	Socorro	LINEAR	·	1.2 km	MPC · JPL
267068	1999 RA_{249}	—	September 7, 1999	Socorro	LINEAR	·	1.0 km	MPC · JPL
267069	1999 TY_{48}	—	October 4, 1999	Kitt Peak	Spacewatch	·	670 m	MPC · JPL
267070	1999 TH_{64}	—	October 8, 1999	Kitt Peak	Spacewatch	·	2.7 km	MPC · JPL
267071	1999 TP_{66}	—	October 8, 1999	Kitt Peak	Spacewatch	·	2.7 km	MPC · JPL
267072	1999 TG_{70}	—	October 9, 1999	Kitt Peak	Spacewatch	·	860 m	MPC · JPL
267073	1999 TT_{82}	—	October 12, 1999	Kitt Peak	Spacewatch	AGN	1.4 km	MPC · JPL
267074	1999 TR_{103}	—	October 3, 1999	Socorro	LINEAR	(883)	1.0 km	MPC · JPL
267075	1999 TV_{169}	—	October 10, 1999	Socorro	LINEAR	·	3.8 km	MPC · JPL
267076	1999 TW_{192}	—	October 12, 1999	Socorro	LINEAR	·	790 m	MPC · JPL
267077	1999 TC_{204}	—	October 13, 1999	Socorro	LINEAR	·	910 m	MPC · JPL
267078	1999 TK_{224}	—	October 1, 1999	Kitt Peak	Spacewatch	GEF	1.6 km	MPC · JPL
267079	1999 TY_{265}	—	October 3, 1999	Socorro	LINEAR	H	710 m	MPC · JPL
267080	1999 TF_{294}	—	October 1, 1999	Kitt Peak	Spacewatch	·	880 m	MPC · JPL
267081	1999 TR_{318}	—	October 12, 1999	Kitt Peak	Spacewatch	(5)	3.0 km	MPC · JPL
267082	1999 UG_{59}	—	October 31, 1999	Kitt Peak	Spacewatch	·	2.0 km	MPC · JPL
267083	1999 VD_{59}	—	November 4, 1999	Socorro	LINEAR	·	970 m	MPC · JPL
267084	1999 VQ_{74}	—	November 5, 1999	Kitt Peak	Spacewatch	·	3.1 km	MPC · JPL
267085	1999 VW_{75}	—	November 5, 1999	Kitt Peak	Spacewatch	KOR	1.9 km	MPC · JPL
267086	1999 VK_{83}	—	November 1, 1999	Kitt Peak	Spacewatch	·	870 m	MPC · JPL
267087	1999 VJ_{91}	—	November 5, 1999	Socorro	LINEAR	BRA	2.4 km	MPC · JPL
267088	1999 VS_{126}	—	November 9, 1999	Kitt Peak	Spacewatch	·	3.2 km	MPC · JPL
267089	1999 VU_{132}	—	November 10, 1999	Kitt Peak	Spacewatch	·	3.5 km	MPC · JPL
267090	1999 VS_{198}	—	November 3, 1999	Catalina	CSS	·	2.2 km	MPC · JPL
267091	1999 VE_{210}	—	November 12, 1999	Socorro	LINEAR	KOR	1.9 km	MPC · JPL
267092	1999 VW_{214}	—	November 1, 1999	Kitt Peak	Spacewatch	·	820 m	MPC · JPL
267093	1999 XO_{45}	—	December 7, 1999	Socorro	LINEAR	DOR	4.2 km	MPC · JPL
267094	1999 XJ_{131}	—	December 12, 1999	Socorro	LINEAR	fast	4.7 km	MPC · JPL
267095	1999 XB_{138}	—	December 2, 1999	Kitt Peak	Spacewatch	·	790 m	MPC · JPL
267096	1999 XZ_{139}	—	December 2, 1999	Kitt Peak	Spacewatch	·	1.4 km	MPC · JPL
267097	1999 XQ_{145}	—	December 7, 1999	Kitt Peak	Spacewatch	KOR	1.9 km	MPC · JPL
267098	1999 XC_{217}	—	December 13, 1999	Kitt Peak	Spacewatch	·	2.7 km	MPC · JPL
267099	1999 XG_{227}	—	December 15, 1999	Kitt Peak	Spacewatch	L4	15 km	MPC · JPL
267100	1999 XL_{251}	—	December 9, 1999	Kitt Peak	Spacewatch	·	840 m	MPC · JPL

== 267101–267200 ==
back to top

Designation			Discovery			Properties		Ref
Permanent	Provisional	Named after	Date	Site	Discoverer(s)	Category	Diam.	Ref
267101	1999 XO_{255}	—	December 12, 1999	Kitt Peak	Spacewatch	·	2.3 km	MPC · JPL
267102	1999 YU	—	December 17, 1999	Socorro	LINEAR	H	820 m	MPC · JPL
267103	1999 YE_{4}	—	December 19, 1999	Socorro	LINEAR	PHO	1.6 km	MPC · JPL
267104	2000 AR_{19}	—	January 3, 2000	Socorro	LINEAR	·	1.2 km	MPC · JPL
267105	2000 AF_{72}	—	January 5, 2000	Socorro	LINEAR	·	1.2 km	MPC · JPL
267106	2000 AE_{82}	—	January 5, 2000	Socorro	LINEAR	·	1.5 km	MPC · JPL
267107	2000 AY_{92}	—	January 3, 2000	Socorro	LINEAR	H	780 m	MPC · JPL
267108	2000 AP_{218}	—	January 8, 2000	Kitt Peak	Spacewatch	·	1.2 km	MPC · JPL
267109	2000 AW_{231}	—	January 4, 2000	Socorro	LINEAR	·	2.4 km	MPC · JPL
267110	2000 BV_{13}	—	January 29, 2000	Kitt Peak	Spacewatch	·	1.4 km	MPC · JPL
267111	2000 CZ_{2}	—	February 2, 2000	Socorro	LINEAR	·	1.6 km	MPC · JPL
267112	2000 CF_{17}	—	February 2, 2000	Socorro	LINEAR	·	1.5 km	MPC · JPL
267113	2000 CP_{42}	—	February 2, 2000	Socorro	LINEAR	EUP	6.4 km	MPC · JPL
267114	2000 CJ_{114}	—	February 12, 2000	Kitt Peak	Spacewatch	·	5.1 km	MPC · JPL
267115	2000 CQ_{120}	—	February 4, 2000	Socorro	LINEAR	·	5.6 km	MPC · JPL
267116	2000 CN_{122}	—	February 3, 2000	Socorro	LINEAR	NYS	1.3 km	MPC · JPL
267117	2000 DE_{10}	—	February 26, 2000	Kitt Peak	Spacewatch	·	1.6 km	MPC · JPL
267118	2000 DR_{25}	—	February 29, 2000	Socorro	LINEAR	·	5.4 km	MPC · JPL
267119	2000 DA_{29}	—	February 29, 2000	Socorro	LINEAR	·	3.9 km	MPC · JPL
267120	2000 DC_{72}	—	February 29, 2000	Socorro	LINEAR	·	4.5 km	MPC · JPL
267121	2000 DJ_{87}	—	February 29, 2000	Socorro	LINEAR	·	4.6 km	MPC · JPL
267122	2000 DO_{90}	—	February 27, 2000	Kitt Peak	Spacewatch	·	1.7 km	MPC · JPL
267123	2000 DY_{90}	—	February 27, 2000	Kitt Peak	Spacewatch	·	2.8 km	MPC · JPL
267124	2000 DT_{101}	—	February 29, 2000	Socorro	LINEAR	·	3.7 km	MPC · JPL
267125	2000 DF_{111}	—	February 29, 2000	Socorro	LINEAR	NYS	1.4 km	MPC · JPL
267126	2000 DC_{113}	—	February 27, 2000	Kitt Peak	Spacewatch	H	620 m	MPC · JPL
267127	2000 DO_{117}	—	February 25, 2000	Kitt Peak	Spacewatch	EOS	2.6 km	MPC · JPL
267128	2000 EA_{5}	—	March 2, 2000	Kitt Peak	Spacewatch	EOS	2.6 km	MPC · JPL
267129	2000 EU_{13}	—	March 5, 2000	Socorro	LINEAR	NYS	1.4 km	MPC · JPL
267130	2000 ED_{23}	—	March 3, 2000	Kitt Peak	Spacewatch	fast	1.5 km	MPC · JPL
267131	2000 EK_{26}	—	March 4, 2000	Socorro	LINEAR	APO +1km · PHA	800 m	MPC · JPL
267132	2000 EF_{27}	—	March 3, 2000	Socorro	LINEAR	·	4.1 km	MPC · JPL
267133	2000 ET_{27}	—	March 4, 2000	Socorro	LINEAR	·	6.3 km	MPC · JPL
267134	2000 EQ_{63}	—	March 10, 2000	Socorro	LINEAR	·	1.3 km	MPC · JPL
267135	2000 EL_{64}	—	March 10, 2000	Socorro	LINEAR	NYS	1.4 km	MPC · JPL
267136	2000 EF_{104}	—	March 11, 2000	Catalina	CSS	APO	580 m	MPC · JPL
267137	2000 EU_{115}	—	March 10, 2000	Kitt Peak	Spacewatch	·	1.3 km	MPC · JPL
267138	2000 EB_{122}	—	March 11, 2000	Anderson Mesa	LONEOS	·	4.2 km	MPC · JPL
267139	2000 EW_{152}	—	March 6, 2000	Haleakala	NEAT	·	1.6 km	MPC · JPL
267140	2000 ER_{159}	—	March 3, 2000	Socorro	LINEAR	·	3.8 km	MPC · JPL
267141	2000 EJ_{174}	—	March 5, 2000	Socorro	LINEAR	·	4.3 km	MPC · JPL
267142	2000 EV_{193}	—	March 3, 2000	Socorro	LINEAR	NYS	1.4 km	MPC · JPL
267143	2000 FA_{5}	—	March 27, 2000	Kitt Peak	Spacewatch	EOS	2.7 km	MPC · JPL
267144	2000 FF_{6}	—	March 25, 2000	Kitt Peak	Spacewatch	·	1.6 km	MPC · JPL
267145	2000 FG_{15}	—	March 29, 2000	Socorro	LINEAR	H	910 m	MPC · JPL
267146	2000 FS_{24}	—	March 29, 2000	Socorro	LINEAR	·	2.0 km	MPC · JPL
267147	2000 FM_{48}	—	March 29, 2000	Socorro	LINEAR	·	5.5 km	MPC · JPL
267148	2000 FD_{62}	—	March 26, 2000	Anderson Mesa	LONEOS	·	4.4 km	MPC · JPL
267149	2000 FJ_{73}	—	March 25, 2000	Kitt Peak	Spacewatch	·	3.2 km	MPC · JPL
267150	2000 GJ_{4}	—	April 3, 2000	Socorro	LINEAR	H	1.1 km	MPC · JPL
267151	2000 GF_{30}	—	April 5, 2000	Socorro	LINEAR	NYS	1.4 km	MPC · JPL
267152	2000 GH_{32}	—	April 5, 2000	Socorro	LINEAR	V	950 m	MPC · JPL
267153	2000 GQ_{56}	—	April 5, 2000	Socorro	LINEAR	NYS	1.5 km	MPC · JPL
267154	2000 GM_{69}	—	April 5, 2000	Socorro	LINEAR	(11097)	3.1 km	MPC · JPL
267155	2000 GV_{86}	—	April 4, 2000	Socorro	LINEAR	·	1.8 km	MPC · JPL
267156	2000 GB_{104}	—	April 7, 2000	Socorro	LINEAR	NYS	2.0 km	MPC · JPL
267157	2000 GB_{130}	—	April 5, 2000	Kitt Peak	Spacewatch	MAS	760 m	MPC · JPL
267158	2000 GN_{142}	—	April 7, 2000	Anderson Mesa	LONEOS	·	2.0 km	MPC · JPL
267159	2000 GO_{149}	—	April 5, 2000	Socorro	LINEAR	·	3.8 km	MPC · JPL
267160	2000 GR_{171}	—	April 3, 2000	Socorro	LINEAR	EUP	3.6 km	MPC · JPL
267161	2000 GK_{178}	—	April 2, 2000	Anderson Mesa	LONEOS	TIR	3.5 km	MPC · JPL
267162	2000 HW_{27}	—	April 28, 2000	Socorro	LINEAR	T_{j} (2.98)	4.4 km	MPC · JPL
267163	2000 HA_{34}	—	April 25, 2000	Anderson Mesa	LONEOS	·	4.4 km	MPC · JPL
267164	2000 HT_{42}	—	April 29, 2000	Socorro	LINEAR	EUP	4.5 km	MPC · JPL
267165	2000 HY_{58}	—	April 25, 2000	Anderson Mesa	LONEOS	·	2.8 km	MPC · JPL
267166	2000 HH_{59}	—	April 25, 2000	Anderson Mesa	LONEOS	·	1.9 km	MPC · JPL
267167	2000 HQ_{82}	—	April 29, 2000	Socorro	LINEAR	MAS	1.0 km	MPC · JPL
267168	2000 HR_{86}	—	April 30, 2000	Anderson Mesa	LONEOS	NYS	1.6 km	MPC · JPL
267169	2000 HW_{97}	—	April 26, 2000	Anderson Mesa	LONEOS	MAS	1.0 km	MPC · JPL
267170	2000 HF_{103}	—	April 27, 2000	Anderson Mesa	LONEOS	·	1.8 km	MPC · JPL
267171	2000 JZ_{5}	—	May 2, 2000	Socorro	LINEAR	·	5.0 km	MPC · JPL
267172	2000 JC_{10}	—	May 2, 2000	Socorro	LINEAR	PHO	1.3 km	MPC · JPL
267173	2000 JW_{13}	—	May 6, 2000	Socorro	LINEAR	NYS	1.3 km	MPC · JPL
267174	2000 KW_{70}	—	May 28, 2000	Socorro	LINEAR	·	2.0 km	MPC · JPL
267175	2000 MR_{6}	—	June 25, 2000	Haleakala	NEAT	·	4.2 km	MPC · JPL
267176	2000 OO	—	July 23, 2000	Reedy Creek	J. Broughton	·	3.5 km	MPC · JPL
267177	2000 OF_{34}	—	July 30, 2000	Socorro	LINEAR	·	1.8 km	MPC · JPL
267178	2000 OB_{35}	—	July 30, 2000	Socorro	LINEAR	·	2.0 km	MPC · JPL
267179	2000 QF_{9}	—	August 22, 2000	Prescott	P. G. Comba	·	1.1 km	MPC · JPL
267180	2000 QK_{32}	—	August 26, 2000	Socorro	LINEAR	BRG	2.8 km	MPC · JPL
267181	2000 QD_{56}	—	August 26, 2000	Socorro	LINEAR	MAR	1.8 km	MPC · JPL
267182	2000 QX_{57}	—	August 26, 2000	Socorro	LINEAR	EUN	2.1 km	MPC · JPL
267183	2000 QP_{62}	—	August 28, 2000	Socorro	LINEAR	·	1.9 km	MPC · JPL
267184	2000 QN_{101}	—	August 28, 2000	Socorro	LINEAR	·	2.5 km	MPC · JPL
267185	2000 QE_{118}	—	August 25, 2000	Socorro	LINEAR	EUN	1.8 km	MPC · JPL
267186	2000 QH_{145}	—	August 31, 2000	Socorro	LINEAR	·	2.6 km	MPC · JPL
267187	2000 QX_{145}	—	August 31, 2000	Socorro	LINEAR	·	1.9 km	MPC · JPL
267188	2000 QQ_{147}	—	August 31, 2000	Socorro	LINEAR	·	2.5 km	MPC · JPL
267189	2000 QK_{194}	—	August 31, 2000	Socorro	LINEAR	·	1.9 km	MPC · JPL
267190	2000 QO_{200}	—	August 29, 2000	Socorro	LINEAR	·	1.8 km	MPC · JPL
267191	2000 QQ_{203}	—	August 29, 2000	Socorro	LINEAR	·	1.9 km	MPC · JPL
267192	2000 QH_{227}	—	August 31, 2000	Socorro	LINEAR	·	1.8 km	MPC · JPL
267193	2000 RY_{31}	—	September 1, 2000	Socorro	LINEAR	·	2.4 km	MPC · JPL
267194	2000 RM_{81}	—	September 1, 2000	Socorro	LINEAR	JUN	2.3 km	MPC · JPL
267195	2000 RL_{88}	—	September 3, 2000	Socorro	LINEAR	·	5.2 km	MPC · JPL
267196	2000 RS_{88}	—	September 3, 2000	Socorro	LINEAR	·	3.7 km	MPC · JPL
267197	2000 SP_{9}	—	September 23, 2000	Socorro	LINEAR	HNS	2.5 km	MPC · JPL
267198	2000 SA_{14}	—	September 22, 2000	Socorro	LINEAR	MAR	2.0 km	MPC · JPL
267199	2000 SH_{29}	—	September 24, 2000	Socorro	LINEAR	·	1.9 km	MPC · JPL
267200	2000 SE_{36}	—	September 24, 2000	Socorro	LINEAR	·	3.9 km	MPC · JPL

== 267201–267300 ==
back to top

Designation			Discovery			Properties		Ref
Permanent	Provisional	Named after	Date	Site	Discoverer(s)	Category	Diam.	Ref
267201	2000 SZ_{92}	—	September 23, 2000	Socorro	LINEAR	·	2.6 km	MPC · JPL
267202	2000 SM_{97}	—	September 23, 2000	Socorro	LINEAR	·	2.6 km	MPC · JPL
267203	2000 SX_{132}	—	September 23, 2000	Socorro	LINEAR	·	2.2 km	MPC · JPL
267204	2000 SQ_{135}	—	September 23, 2000	Socorro	LINEAR	·	2.5 km	MPC · JPL
267205	2000 SZ_{173}	—	September 28, 2000	Socorro	LINEAR	·	2.8 km	MPC · JPL
267206	2000 SB_{248}	—	September 24, 2000	Socorro	LINEAR	·	1.6 km	MPC · JPL
267207	2000 SG_{251}	—	September 24, 2000	Socorro	LINEAR	·	3.5 km	MPC · JPL
267208	2000 SU_{263}	—	September 26, 2000	Socorro	LINEAR	·	2.6 km	MPC · JPL
267209	2000 SV_{304}	—	September 30, 2000	Socorro	LINEAR	·	2.7 km	MPC · JPL
267210	2000 SA_{321}	—	September 29, 2000	Bergisch Gladbach	W. Bickel	·	1.4 km	MPC · JPL
267211	2000 SZ_{363}	—	September 20, 2000	Socorro	LINEAR	MAR	1.5 km	MPC · JPL
267212	2000 TZ_{39}	—	October 1, 2000	Socorro	LINEAR	·	3.1 km	MPC · JPL
267213	2000 TW_{57}	—	October 2, 2000	Socorro	LINEAR	·	2.4 km	MPC · JPL
267214	2000 TP_{59}	—	October 2, 2000	Anderson Mesa	LONEOS	EUN	2.0 km	MPC · JPL
267215	2000 UQ_{68}	—	October 25, 2000	Socorro	LINEAR	·	1.6 km	MPC · JPL
267216	2000 UE_{114}	—	October 25, 2000	Socorro	LINEAR	·	710 m	MPC · JPL
267217	2000 VO_{7}	—	November 1, 2000	Socorro	LINEAR	·	3.2 km	MPC · JPL
267218	2000 WS_{103}	—	November 27, 2000	Socorro	LINEAR	·	2.6 km	MPC · JPL
267219	2000 WZ_{105}	—	November 29, 2000	Kitt Peak	Spacewatch	GEF	1.9 km	MPC · JPL
267220	2000 WK_{155}	—	November 30, 2000	Socorro	LINEAR	·	2.1 km	MPC · JPL
267221	2001 AD_{2}	—	January 2, 2001	Socorro	LINEAR	APO · PHA	560 m	MPC · JPL
267222	2001 DN_{2}	—	February 16, 2001	Kitt Peak	Spacewatch	·	1.9 km	MPC · JPL
267223	2001 DQ_{8}	—	February 16, 2001	Socorro	LINEAR	APO +1km	820 m	MPC · JPL
267224	2001 FL_{4}	—	March 19, 2001	Kitt Peak	Spacewatch	BRA	2.1 km	MPC · JPL
267225	2001 FM_{18}	—	March 19, 2001	Anderson Mesa	LONEOS	·	1.0 km	MPC · JPL
267226	2001 FR_{69}	—	March 19, 2001	Socorro	LINEAR	·	1.2 km	MPC · JPL
267227	2001 FC_{74}	—	March 19, 2001	Socorro	LINEAR	·	2.5 km	MPC · JPL
267228	2001 FT_{125}	—	March 24, 2001	Kitt Peak	Spacewatch	·	2.5 km	MPC · JPL
267229	2001 FQ_{181}	—	March 21, 2001	Kitt Peak	Spacewatch	·	1.1 km	MPC · JPL
267230	2001 HW_{13}	—	April 18, 2001	Prescott	P. G. Comba	·	5.6 km	MPC · JPL
267231	2001 HV_{14}	—	April 23, 2001	Kitt Peak	Spacewatch	·	870 m	MPC · JPL
267232	2001 HC_{20}	—	April 26, 2001	Socorro	LINEAR	·	3.8 km	MPC · JPL
267233	2001 HE_{21}	—	April 23, 2001	Socorro	LINEAR	EOS	3.7 km	MPC · JPL
267234	2001 HY_{63}	—	April 27, 2001	Socorro	LINEAR	·	4.0 km	MPC · JPL
267235	2001 KP	—	May 17, 2001	Socorro	LINEAR	PHO	1.7 km	MPC · JPL
267236	2001 KN_{15}	—	May 18, 2001	Socorro	LINEAR	·	1.2 km	MPC · JPL
267237	2001 KL_{21}	—	May 23, 2001	Socorro	LINEAR	·	3.5 km	MPC · JPL
267238	2001 KD_{51}	—	May 22, 2001	Socorro	LINEAR	·	1.2 km	MPC · JPL
267239	2001 KT_{60}	—	May 17, 2001	Socorro	LINEAR	·	2.4 km	MPC · JPL
267240	2001 NW_{5}	—	July 13, 2001	Palomar	NEAT	·	1.6 km	MPC · JPL
267241	2001 NP_{19}	—	July 15, 2001	Haleakala	NEAT	·	1.8 km	MPC · JPL
267242	2001 OZ_{35}	—	July 24, 2001	Palomar	NEAT	·	1.6 km	MPC · JPL
267243	2001 OZ_{38}	—	July 20, 2001	Palomar	NEAT	·	2.0 km	MPC · JPL
267244	2001 OA_{39}	—	July 20, 2001	Palomar	NEAT	·	1.0 km	MPC · JPL
267245	2001 OE_{41}	—	July 21, 2001	Palomar	NEAT	·	2.9 km	MPC · JPL
267246	2001 OE_{68}	—	July 16, 2001	Anderson Mesa	LONEOS	·	1.8 km	MPC · JPL
267247	2001 OJ_{87}	—	July 29, 2001	Palomar	NEAT	·	3.1 km	MPC · JPL
267248	2001 OT_{100}	—	July 27, 2001	Anderson Mesa	LONEOS	·	1.5 km	MPC · JPL
267249	2001 PV_{4}	—	August 6, 2001	Haleakala	NEAT	H	760 m	MPC · JPL
267250	2001 PC_{25}	—	August 11, 2001	Haleakala	NEAT	·	1.7 km	MPC · JPL
267251	2001 PS_{26}	—	August 11, 2001	Haleakala	NEAT	ERI	2.2 km	MPC · JPL
267252	2001 PS_{57}	—	August 14, 2001	Haleakala	NEAT	·	1.4 km	MPC · JPL
267253	2001 PS_{58}	—	August 14, 2001	Haleakala	NEAT	·	1.6 km	MPC · JPL
267254	2001 QR_{13}	—	August 16, 2001	Socorro	LINEAR	·	1.6 km	MPC · JPL
267255	2001 QN_{37}	—	August 16, 2001	Socorro	LINEAR	·	1.8 km	MPC · JPL
267256	2001 QR_{44}	—	August 16, 2001	Socorro	LINEAR	NYS	1.3 km	MPC · JPL
267257	2001 QY_{91}	—	August 19, 2001	Socorro	LINEAR	·	2.1 km	MPC · JPL
267258	2001 QX_{168}	—	August 26, 2001	Haleakala	NEAT	V	930 m	MPC · JPL
267259	2001 QQ_{175}	—	August 22, 2001	Kitt Peak	Spacewatch	H	680 m	MPC · JPL
267260	2001 QO_{178}	—	August 26, 2001	Haleakala	NEAT	·	1.9 km	MPC · JPL
267261	2001 QN_{180}	—	August 25, 2001	Palomar	NEAT	NYS	1.9 km	MPC · JPL
267262	2001 QL_{203}	—	August 23, 2001	Anderson Mesa	LONEOS	·	1.5 km	MPC · JPL
267263	2001 QG_{222}	—	August 24, 2001	Anderson Mesa	LONEOS	·	1.9 km	MPC · JPL
267264	2001 QW_{230}	—	August 24, 2001	Anderson Mesa	LONEOS	H	870 m	MPC · JPL
267265	2001 QN_{255}	—	August 25, 2001	Socorro	LINEAR	·	2.0 km	MPC · JPL
267266	2001 QH_{265}	—	August 26, 2001	Desert Eagle	W. K. Y. Yeung	V	890 m	MPC · JPL
267267	2001 QK_{270}	—	August 19, 2001	Socorro	LINEAR	MAS	850 m	MPC · JPL
267268	2001 QJ_{294}	—	August 24, 2001	Anderson Mesa	LONEOS	·	1.3 km	MPC · JPL
267269	2001 RB_{8}	—	September 8, 2001	Socorro	LINEAR	·	1.6 km	MPC · JPL
267270	2001 RP_{17}	—	September 11, 2001	Socorro	LINEAR	AMO +1km	790 m	MPC · JPL
267271	2001 RC_{21}	—	September 7, 2001	Socorro	LINEAR	MAS	940 m	MPC · JPL
267272	2001 RG_{29}	—	September 7, 2001	Socorro	LINEAR	·	1.4 km	MPC · JPL
267273	2001 RX_{35}	—	September 8, 2001	Socorro	LINEAR	·	3.9 km	MPC · JPL
267274	2001 RG_{47}	—	September 12, 2001	Socorro	LINEAR	BAR	1.5 km	MPC · JPL
267275	2001 RH_{59}	—	September 12, 2001	Socorro	LINEAR	H	810 m	MPC · JPL
267276	2001 RG_{71}	—	September 10, 2001	Socorro	LINEAR	V	1.2 km	MPC · JPL
267277	2001 RT_{114}	—	September 12, 2001	Socorro	LINEAR	·	1.5 km	MPC · JPL
267278	2001 RO_{118}	—	September 12, 2001	Socorro	LINEAR	·	1.6 km	MPC · JPL
267279	2001 RR_{139}	—	September 12, 2001	Socorro	LINEAR	·	1.6 km	MPC · JPL
267280	2001 RK_{152}	—	September 11, 2001	Anderson Mesa	LONEOS	·	2.0 km	MPC · JPL
267281	2001 SM_{11}	—	September 16, 2001	Socorro	LINEAR	·	1.6 km	MPC · JPL
267282	2001 SC_{21}	—	September 16, 2001	Socorro	LINEAR	·	1.5 km	MPC · JPL
267283	2001 SC_{51}	—	September 16, 2001	Socorro	LINEAR	MAS	940 m	MPC · JPL
267284	2001 SP_{54}	—	September 16, 2001	Socorro	LINEAR	·	1.6 km	MPC · JPL
267285	2001 SX_{61}	—	September 17, 2001	Socorro	LINEAR	·	2.3 km	MPC · JPL
267286	2001 SU_{63}	—	September 17, 2001	Socorro	LINEAR	H	820 m	MPC · JPL
267287	2001 ST_{77}	—	September 19, 2001	Socorro	LINEAR	MAS	990 m	MPC · JPL
267288	2001 SF_{86}	—	September 20, 2001	Socorro	LINEAR	NYS	1.3 km	MPC · JPL
267289	2001 SN_{99}	—	September 20, 2001	Socorro	LINEAR	V	970 m	MPC · JPL
267290	2001 SV_{130}	—	September 16, 2001	Socorro	LINEAR	·	1.2 km	MPC · JPL
267291	2001 SC_{132}	—	September 16, 2001	Socorro	LINEAR	·	1.9 km	MPC · JPL
267292	2001 SN_{138}	—	September 16, 2001	Socorro	LINEAR	·	1.8 km	MPC · JPL
267293	2001 SW_{162}	—	September 17, 2001	Socorro	LINEAR	·	1.6 km	MPC · JPL
267294	2001 SX_{176}	—	September 16, 2001	Socorro	LINEAR	·	1.7 km	MPC · JPL
267295	2001 SF_{177}	—	September 16, 2001	Socorro	LINEAR	·	1.9 km	MPC · JPL
267296	2001 SE_{196}	—	September 19, 2001	Socorro	LINEAR	·	4.3 km	MPC · JPL
267297	2001 SZ_{202}	—	September 19, 2001	Socorro	LINEAR	·	1.6 km	MPC · JPL
267298	2001 SQ_{208}	—	September 19, 2001	Socorro	LINEAR	NYS	1.4 km	MPC · JPL
267299	2001 SZ_{209}	—	September 19, 2001	Socorro	LINEAR	·	1.6 km	MPC · JPL
267300	2001 SP_{217}	—	September 19, 2001	Socorro	LINEAR	T_{j} (2.96)	4.9 km	MPC · JPL

== 267301–267400 ==
back to top

Designation			Discovery			Properties		Ref
Permanent	Provisional	Named after	Date	Site	Discoverer(s)	Category	Diam.	Ref
267301	2001 ST_{224}	—	September 19, 2001	Socorro	LINEAR	NYS	1.4 km	MPC · JPL
267302	2001 SH_{228}	—	September 19, 2001	Socorro	LINEAR	·	1.7 km	MPC · JPL
267303	2001 SB_{229}	—	September 19, 2001	Socorro	LINEAR	NYS	1.4 km	MPC · JPL
267304	2001 SC_{240}	—	September 19, 2001	Socorro	LINEAR	NYS	1.2 km	MPC · JPL
267305	2001 SX_{243}	—	September 19, 2001	Socorro	LINEAR	·	1.1 km	MPC · JPL
267306	2001 SV_{248}	—	September 19, 2001	Socorro	LINEAR	·	2.2 km	MPC · JPL
267307	2001 SJ_{251}	—	September 19, 2001	Socorro	LINEAR	·	2.2 km	MPC · JPL
267308	2001 SE_{256}	—	September 19, 2001	Socorro	LINEAR	·	1.3 km	MPC · JPL
267309	2001 SL_{305}	—	September 20, 2001	Socorro	LINEAR	·	1.7 km	MPC · JPL
267310	2001 TQ_{6}	—	October 10, 2001	Palomar	NEAT	BRG	1.4 km	MPC · JPL
267311	2001 TM_{61}	—	October 13, 2001	Socorro	LINEAR	·	1.3 km	MPC · JPL
267312	2001 TR_{86}	—	October 14, 2001	Socorro	LINEAR	·	1.4 km	MPC · JPL
267313	2001 TR_{91}	—	October 14, 2001	Socorro	LINEAR	·	1.8 km	MPC · JPL
267314	2001 TC_{161}	—	October 11, 2001	Palomar	NEAT	(5)	1.5 km	MPC · JPL
267315	2001 TW_{167}	—	October 15, 2001	Socorro	LINEAR	·	1.9 km	MPC · JPL
267316	2001 TS_{172}	—	October 13, 2001	Socorro	LINEAR	·	1.6 km	MPC · JPL
267317	2001 TF_{210}	—	October 13, 2001	Palomar	NEAT	·	1.8 km	MPC · JPL
267318	2001 TA_{224}	—	October 14, 2001	Socorro	LINEAR	V	1.1 km	MPC · JPL
267319	2001 TK_{254}	—	October 14, 2001	Apache Point	SDSS	·	1.8 km	MPC · JPL
267320	2001 TV_{260}	—	October 8, 2001	Palomar	NEAT	·	1.4 km	MPC · JPL
267321	2001 UX_{1}	—	October 17, 2001	Socorro	LINEAR	H	960 m	MPC · JPL
267322	2001 UC_{31}	—	October 16, 2001	Socorro	LINEAR	·	1.4 km	MPC · JPL
267323	2001 UX_{35}	—	October 16, 2001	Socorro	LINEAR	·	2.0 km	MPC · JPL
267324	2001 UL_{38}	—	October 17, 2001	Socorro	LINEAR	NYS	1.5 km	MPC · JPL
267325	2001 UA_{53}	—	October 17, 2001	Socorro	LINEAR	(1547)	2.0 km	MPC · JPL
267326	2001 UP_{77}	—	October 17, 2001	Socorro	LINEAR	·	1.6 km	MPC · JPL
267327	2001 UP_{87}	—	October 21, 2001	Kitt Peak	Spacewatch	·	1.6 km	MPC · JPL
267328	2001 UL_{102}	—	October 20, 2001	Socorro	LINEAR	(5)	1.1 km	MPC · JPL
267329	2001 UZ_{118}	—	October 22, 2001	Socorro	LINEAR	NYS	1.7 km	MPC · JPL
267330	2001 UU_{134}	—	October 21, 2001	Socorro	LINEAR	·	1.9 km	MPC · JPL
267331	2001 UJ_{141}	—	October 23, 2001	Socorro	LINEAR	·	1.4 km	MPC · JPL
267332	2001 UT_{182}	—	October 16, 2001	Socorro	LINEAR	NYS	1.7 km	MPC · JPL
267333	2001 UZ_{193}	—	October 18, 2001	Palomar	NEAT	·	1.3 km	MPC · JPL
267334	2001 UD_{207}	—	October 20, 2001	Socorro	LINEAR	·	1.8 km	MPC · JPL
267335	2001 UB_{215}	—	October 23, 2001	Socorro	LINEAR	·	1.2 km	MPC · JPL
267336	2001 UR_{226}	—	October 24, 2001	Palomar	NEAT	·	1.2 km	MPC · JPL
267337	2001 VK_{5}	—	November 11, 2001	Socorro	LINEAR	APO +1km · PHA	440 m	MPC · JPL
267338	2001 VF_{45}	—	November 9, 2001	Socorro	LINEAR	EUN	2.1 km	MPC · JPL
267339	2001 VE_{55}	—	November 10, 2001	Socorro	LINEAR	·	1.6 km	MPC · JPL
267340	2001 VC_{86}	—	November 12, 2001	Socorro	LINEAR	·	4.9 km	MPC · JPL
267341	2001 VC_{93}	—	November 15, 2001	Socorro	LINEAR	·	2.1 km	MPC · JPL
267342	2001 VF_{103}	—	November 12, 2001	Socorro	LINEAR	(5)	1.1 km	MPC · JPL
267343	2001 VF_{119}	—	November 12, 2001	Socorro	LINEAR	(5)	1.4 km	MPC · JPL
267344	2001 VY_{120}	—	November 12, 2001	Socorro	LINEAR	·	2.6 km	MPC · JPL
267345	2001 WE_{13}	—	November 17, 2001	Socorro	LINEAR	ADE	2.2 km	MPC · JPL
267346	2001 WC_{16}	—	November 23, 2001	Uccle	T. Pauwels	(5)	1.5 km	MPC · JPL
267347	2001 WM_{31}	—	November 17, 2001	Socorro	LINEAR	(5)	1.4 km	MPC · JPL
267348	2001 WX_{42}	—	November 18, 2001	Socorro	LINEAR	EUN	1.5 km	MPC · JPL
267349	2001 WK_{43}	—	November 18, 2001	Socorro	LINEAR	·	1.1 km	MPC · JPL
267350	2001 WU_{43}	—	November 18, 2001	Socorro	LINEAR	·	1.6 km	MPC · JPL
267351	2001 WM_{55}	—	November 19, 2001	Socorro	LINEAR	(5)	1.3 km	MPC · JPL
267352	2001 WW_{64}	—	November 20, 2001	Socorro	LINEAR	MAR	1.2 km	MPC · JPL
267353	2001 WE_{90}	—	November 21, 2001	Socorro	LINEAR	(5)	2.0 km	MPC · JPL
267354	2001 WS_{90}	—	November 21, 2001	Socorro	LINEAR	(5)	1.4 km	MPC · JPL
267355	2001 XE	—	December 3, 2001	Socorro	LINEAR	·	2.6 km	MPC · JPL
267356	2001 XW_{5}	—	December 7, 2001	Socorro	LINEAR	·	1.7 km	MPC · JPL
267357	2001 XF_{20}	—	December 9, 2001	Socorro	LINEAR	·	2.4 km	MPC · JPL
267358	2001 XX_{21}	—	December 9, 2001	Socorro	LINEAR	HNS	2.0 km	MPC · JPL
267359	2001 XX_{34}	—	December 9, 2001	Socorro	LINEAR	ADE	2.6 km	MPC · JPL
267360	2001 XQ_{37}	—	December 9, 2001	Socorro	LINEAR	·	2.5 km	MPC · JPL
267361	2001 XB_{42}	—	December 9, 2001	Socorro	LINEAR	MAR	1.9 km	MPC · JPL
267362	2001 XS_{42}	—	December 9, 2001	Socorro	LINEAR	·	4.7 km	MPC · JPL
267363	2001 XC_{51}	—	December 10, 2001	Socorro	LINEAR	·	1.7 km	MPC · JPL
267364	2001 XW_{64}	—	December 10, 2001	Socorro	LINEAR	·	3.7 km	MPC · JPL
267365	2001 XO_{70}	—	December 11, 2001	Socorro	LINEAR	(5)	1.6 km	MPC · JPL
267366	2001 XX_{76}	—	December 11, 2001	Socorro	LINEAR	(5)	1.4 km	MPC · JPL
267367	2001 XV_{92}	—	December 10, 2001	Socorro	LINEAR	(5)	1.9 km	MPC · JPL
267368	2001 XQ_{94}	—	December 10, 2001	Socorro	LINEAR	·	1.6 km	MPC · JPL
267369	2001 XX_{94}	—	December 10, 2001	Socorro	LINEAR	·	1.8 km	MPC · JPL
267370	2001 XZ_{104}	—	December 14, 2001	Kitt Peak	Spacewatch	·	1.7 km	MPC · JPL
267371	2001 XJ_{118}	—	December 13, 2001	Socorro	LINEAR	·	2.5 km	MPC · JPL
267372	2001 XP_{156}	—	December 14, 2001	Socorro	LINEAR	·	2.1 km	MPC · JPL
267373	2001 XV_{158}	—	December 14, 2001	Socorro	LINEAR	(5)	2.5 km	MPC · JPL
267374	2001 XS_{167}	—	December 14, 2001	Socorro	LINEAR	·	1.7 km	MPC · JPL
267375	2001 XD_{180}	—	December 14, 2001	Socorro	LINEAR	·	1.9 km	MPC · JPL
267376	2001 XU_{183}	—	December 14, 2001	Socorro	LINEAR	·	2.1 km	MPC · JPL
267377	2001 XG_{195}	—	December 14, 2001	Socorro	LINEAR	HNS	1.7 km	MPC · JPL
267378	2001 XD_{217}	—	December 14, 2001	Socorro	LINEAR	JUN	1.5 km	MPC · JPL
267379	2001 XE_{219}	—	December 15, 2001	Socorro	LINEAR	(5)	1.5 km	MPC · JPL
267380	2001 XU_{227}	—	December 15, 2001	Socorro	LINEAR	·	1.3 km	MPC · JPL
267381	2001 XA_{229}	—	December 15, 2001	Socorro	LINEAR	·	2.0 km	MPC · JPL
267382	2001 XY_{230}	—	December 15, 2001	Socorro	LINEAR	·	1.9 km	MPC · JPL
267383	2001 XB_{232}	—	December 15, 2001	Socorro	LINEAR	·	2.0 km	MPC · JPL
267384	2001 XO_{233}	—	December 15, 2001	Socorro	LINEAR	·	1.8 km	MPC · JPL
267385	2001 XS_{236}	—	December 15, 2001	Socorro	LINEAR	·	1.9 km	MPC · JPL
267386	2001 XD_{240}	—	December 15, 2001	Socorro	LINEAR	·	2.5 km	MPC · JPL
267387	2001 XN_{245}	—	December 15, 2001	Socorro	LINEAR	(5)	1.6 km	MPC · JPL
267388	2001 YO_{13}	—	December 17, 2001	Socorro	LINEAR	EMA	5.3 km	MPC · JPL
267389	2001 YU_{65}	—	December 18, 2001	Socorro	LINEAR	·	1.7 km	MPC · JPL
267390	2001 YY_{85}	—	December 18, 2001	Socorro	LINEAR	(5)	1.8 km	MPC · JPL
267391	2001 YK_{95}	—	December 18, 2001	Palomar	NEAT	(5)	3.3 km	MPC · JPL
267392	2001 YX_{96}	—	December 17, 2001	Socorro	LINEAR	·	1.5 km	MPC · JPL
267393	2001 YL_{108}	—	December 17, 2001	Socorro	LINEAR	HNS	1.5 km	MPC · JPL
267394	2001 YR_{126}	—	December 17, 2001	Socorro	LINEAR	·	3.1 km	MPC · JPL
267395	2001 YU_{154}	—	December 19, 2001	Palomar	NEAT	·	2.1 km	MPC · JPL
267396	2001 YD_{160}	—	December 18, 2001	Apache Point	SDSS	MAR	1.6 km	MPC · JPL
267397	2002 AT_{16}	—	January 5, 2002	Haleakala	NEAT	JUN	1.4 km	MPC · JPL
267398	2002 AV_{23}	—	January 6, 2002	Palomar	NEAT	·	1.5 km	MPC · JPL
267399	2002 AO_{28}	—	January 7, 2002	Anderson Mesa	LONEOS	·	2.9 km	MPC · JPL
267400	2002 AZ_{38}	—	January 9, 2002	Socorro	LINEAR	·	2.6 km	MPC · JPL

== 267401–267500 ==
back to top

Designation			Discovery			Properties		Ref
Permanent	Provisional	Named after	Date	Site	Discoverer(s)	Category	Diam.	Ref
267401	2002 AS_{68}	—	January 12, 2002	Kitt Peak	Spacewatch	·	1.5 km	MPC · JPL
267402	2002 AX_{71}	—	January 8, 2002	Socorro	LINEAR	·	2.8 km	MPC · JPL
267403	2002 AE_{98}	—	January 8, 2002	Socorro	LINEAR	·	1.8 km	MPC · JPL
267404	2002 AU_{98}	—	January 8, 2002	Socorro	LINEAR	·	2.7 km	MPC · JPL
267405	2002 AH_{101}	—	January 8, 2002	Socorro	LINEAR	·	2.0 km	MPC · JPL
267406	2002 AN_{107}	—	January 9, 2002	Socorro	LINEAR	·	1.7 km	MPC · JPL
267407	2002 AF_{114}	—	January 9, 2002	Socorro	LINEAR	·	2.2 km	MPC · JPL
267408	2002 AL_{145}	—	January 13, 2002	Socorro	LINEAR	·	1.8 km	MPC · JPL
267409	2002 AT_{171}	—	January 14, 2002	Socorro	LINEAR	(5)	1.8 km	MPC · JPL
267410	2002 AM_{172}	—	January 14, 2002	Socorro	LINEAR	·	2.3 km	MPC · JPL
267411	2002 AF_{181}	—	January 5, 2002	Palomar	NEAT	·	2.3 km	MPC · JPL
267412	2002 AR_{197}	—	January 14, 2002	Palomar	NEAT	·	2.9 km	MPC · JPL
267413	2002 AN_{202}	—	January 13, 2002	Socorro	LINEAR	·	1.9 km	MPC · JPL
267414	2002 AB_{203}	—	January 14, 2002	Socorro	LINEAR	JUN	1.2 km	MPC · JPL
267415	2002 BT_{1}	—	January 20, 2002	Desert Eagle	W. K. Y. Yeung	·	2.8 km	MPC · JPL
267416	2002 BV_{1}	—	January 21, 2002	Desert Eagle	W. K. Y. Yeung	·	2.0 km	MPC · JPL
267417	2002 BY_{14}	—	January 19, 2002	Socorro	LINEAR	·	2.5 km	MPC · JPL
267418	2002 BV_{22}	—	January 23, 2002	Socorro	LINEAR	·	3.3 km	MPC · JPL
267419	2002 CF_{4}	—	February 6, 2002	Socorro	LINEAR	JUN	1.5 km	MPC · JPL
267420	2002 CE_{9}	—	February 6, 2002	Kitt Peak	Spacewatch	·	1.8 km	MPC · JPL
267421	2002 CD_{22}	—	February 5, 2002	Palomar	NEAT	·	1.7 km	MPC · JPL
267422	2002 CN_{36}	—	February 7, 2002	Socorro	LINEAR	MIS	3.3 km	MPC · JPL
267423	2002 CG_{41}	—	February 7, 2002	Palomar	NEAT	·	2.2 km	MPC · JPL
267424	2002 CY_{50}	—	February 12, 2002	Desert Eagle	W. K. Y. Yeung	·	2.5 km	MPC · JPL
267425	2002 CA_{56}	—	February 7, 2002	Socorro	LINEAR	·	3.4 km	MPC · JPL
267426	2002 CB_{60}	—	February 6, 2002	Socorro	LINEAR	·	2.7 km	MPC · JPL
267427	2002 CS_{64}	—	February 6, 2002	Socorro	LINEAR	·	2.5 km	MPC · JPL
267428	2002 CE_{65}	—	February 6, 2002	Socorro	LINEAR	EUN	1.9 km	MPC · JPL
267429	2002 CD_{69}	—	February 7, 2002	Socorro	LINEAR	·	2.3 km	MPC · JPL
267430	2002 CH_{73}	—	February 7, 2002	Socorro	LINEAR	·	1.8 km	MPC · JPL
267431	2002 CU_{102}	—	February 7, 2002	Socorro	LINEAR	·	1.8 km	MPC · JPL
267432	2002 CM_{120}	—	December 23, 2001	Anderson Mesa	LONEOS	·	2.7 km	MPC · JPL
267433	2002 CR_{124}	—	February 7, 2002	Socorro	LINEAR	·	2.6 km	MPC · JPL
267434	2002 CF_{130}	—	February 7, 2002	Socorro	LINEAR	·	2.4 km	MPC · JPL
267435	2002 CL_{143}	—	February 9, 2002	Socorro	LINEAR	·	2.5 km	MPC · JPL
267436	2002 CM_{157}	—	February 7, 2002	Socorro	LINEAR	·	1.8 km	MPC · JPL
267437	2002 CZ_{177}	—	February 10, 2002	Socorro	LINEAR	·	1.9 km	MPC · JPL
267438	2002 CY_{189}	—	February 10, 2002	Socorro	LINEAR	GEF	1.5 km	MPC · JPL
267439	2002 CE_{198}	—	February 10, 2002	Socorro	LINEAR	·	2.1 km	MPC · JPL
267440	2002 CK_{212}	—	February 10, 2002	Socorro	LINEAR	·	1.8 km	MPC · JPL
267441	2002 CS_{216}	—	February 10, 2002	Socorro	LINEAR	·	2.6 km	MPC · JPL
267442	2002 CQ_{272}	—	February 8, 2002	Anderson Mesa	LONEOS	·	5.5 km	MPC · JPL
267443	2002 CH_{299}	—	February 12, 2002	Socorro	LINEAR	·	2.8 km	MPC · JPL
267444	2002 CA_{304}	—	February 13, 2002	Kitt Peak	Spacewatch	·	2.9 km	MPC · JPL
267445	2002 CJ_{304}	—	February 14, 2002	Kitt Peak	Spacewatch	MRX	1.2 km	MPC · JPL
267446	2002 CH_{314}	—	February 11, 2002	Socorro	LINEAR	·	1.8 km	MPC · JPL
267447	2002 DP_{1}	—	February 18, 2002	Cima Ekar	ADAS	·	2.2 km	MPC · JPL
267448	2002 DF_{7}	—	February 19, 2002	Socorro	LINEAR	JUN	1.5 km	MPC · JPL
267449	2002 DT_{8}	—	February 19, 2002	Socorro	LINEAR	·	8.8 km	MPC · JPL
267450	2002 DN_{10}	—	February 20, 2002	Socorro	LINEAR	·	2.2 km	MPC · JPL
267451	2002 DD_{11}	—	February 19, 2002	Socorro	LINEAR	·	3.8 km	MPC · JPL
267452	2002 DE_{14}	—	February 16, 2002	Palomar	NEAT	·	3.1 km	MPC · JPL
267453	2002 DY_{18}	—	February 21, 2002	Socorro	LINEAR	·	3.2 km	MPC · JPL
267454	2002 EQ_{15}	—	March 5, 2002	Haleakala	NEAT	·	2.9 km	MPC · JPL
267455	2002 EY_{20}	—	March 10, 2002	Palomar	NEAT	·	3.0 km	MPC · JPL
267456	2002 EV_{28}	—	March 9, 2002	Socorro	LINEAR	·	2.4 km	MPC · JPL
267457	2002 ER_{34}	—	March 11, 2002	Palomar	NEAT	AGN	1.6 km	MPC · JPL
267458	2002 EK_{55}	—	March 13, 2002	Socorro	LINEAR	·	2.8 km	MPC · JPL
267459	2002 EZ_{66}	—	March 13, 2002	Socorro	LINEAR	GEF	1.7 km	MPC · JPL
267460	2002 EB_{68}	—	March 13, 2002	Socorro	LINEAR	·	2.1 km	MPC · JPL
267461	2002 EN_{94}	—	March 14, 2002	Socorro	LINEAR	·	2.9 km	MPC · JPL
267462	2002 EW_{98}	—	March 13, 2002	Socorro	LINEAR	·	2.9 km	MPC · JPL
267463	2002 EQ_{100}	—	March 5, 2002	Palomar	NEAT	·	2.3 km	MPC · JPL
267464	2002 EF_{104}	—	March 9, 2002	Anderson Mesa	LONEOS	(18466)	4.0 km	MPC · JPL
267465	2002 EX_{117}	—	March 10, 2002	Kitt Peak	Spacewatch	·	3.7 km	MPC · JPL
267466	2002 EF_{130}	—	March 12, 2002	Anderson Mesa	LONEOS	·	2.9 km	MPC · JPL
267467	2002 EP_{140}	—	March 12, 2002	Palomar	NEAT	·	2.2 km	MPC · JPL
267468	2002 ER_{141}	—	March 12, 2002	Palomar	NEAT	·	2.2 km	MPC · JPL
267469	2002 EJ_{157}	—	March 13, 2002	Palomar	NEAT	EUN	1.3 km	MPC · JPL
267470	2002 FF_{22}	—	March 19, 2002	Socorro	LINEAR	·	3.7 km	MPC · JPL
267471	2002 FJ_{22}	—	March 19, 2002	Socorro	LINEAR	·	3.3 km	MPC · JPL
267472	2002 FW_{22}	—	March 19, 2002	Haleakala	NEAT	·	2.4 km	MPC · JPL
267473	2002 FM_{24}	—	March 19, 2002	Palomar	NEAT	HNS	1.7 km	MPC · JPL
267474	2002 FC_{26}	—	March 19, 2002	Palomar	NEAT	(18466)	3.4 km	MPC · JPL
267475	2002 FV_{31}	—	March 19, 2002	Palomar	NEAT	(13314)	2.1 km	MPC · JPL
267476	2002 GG_{12}	—	April 15, 2002	Desert Eagle	W. K. Y. Yeung	EUN	2.0 km	MPC · JPL
267477	2002 GX_{12}	—	April 14, 2002	Socorro	LINEAR	BRA	2.3 km	MPC · JPL
267478	2002 GB_{24}	—	April 15, 2002	Palomar	NEAT	·	3.6 km	MPC · JPL
267479	2002 GT_{29}	—	April 7, 2002	Cerro Tololo	M. W. Buie	GEF	1.7 km	MPC · JPL
267480	2002 GY_{38}	—	April 2, 2002	Kitt Peak	Spacewatch	AEO	1.5 km	MPC · JPL
267481	2002 GX_{48}	—	April 4, 2002	Palomar	NEAT	·	2.9 km	MPC · JPL
267482	2002 GT_{72}	—	April 9, 2002	Anderson Mesa	LONEOS	·	2.6 km	MPC · JPL
267483	2002 GT_{74}	—	April 9, 2002	Kitt Peak	Spacewatch	·	2.7 km	MPC · JPL
267484	2002 GW_{80}	—	April 10, 2002	Socorro	LINEAR	·	2.9 km	MPC · JPL
267485	2002 GP_{125}	—	April 12, 2002	Socorro	LINEAR	·	2.6 km	MPC · JPL
267486	2002 GY_{137}	—	April 12, 2002	Palomar	NEAT	·	3.8 km	MPC · JPL
267487	2002 GD_{139}	—	April 13, 2002	Kitt Peak	Spacewatch	·	2.3 km	MPC · JPL
267488	2002 GE_{155}	—	April 13, 2002	Palomar	NEAT	·	3.1 km	MPC · JPL
267489	2002 GQ_{164}	—	April 14, 2002	Palomar	NEAT	·	2.2 km	MPC · JPL
267490	2002 GH_{179}	—	April 15, 2002	Palomar	NEAT	·	3.7 km	MPC · JPL
267491	2002 GN_{189}	—	December 1, 2005	Kitt Peak	Spacewatch	·	2.6 km	MPC · JPL
267492	2002 HA_{4}	—	April 16, 2002	Socorro	LINEAR	·	2.2 km	MPC · JPL
267493	2002 JO_{3}	—	May 3, 2002	Anderson Mesa	LONEOS	(18466)	2.8 km	MPC · JPL
267494	2002 JB_{9}	—	May 6, 2002	Socorro	LINEAR	T_{j} (2.53) · APO +1km · PHA	2.1 km	MPC · JPL
267495	2002 JR_{16}	—	May 6, 2002	Palomar	NEAT	·	2.9 km	MPC · JPL
267496	2002 JY_{88}	—	May 11, 2002	Socorro	LINEAR	MRX	1.6 km	MPC · JPL
267497	2002 JZ_{119}	—	May 5, 2002	Palomar	NEAT	·	3.7 km	MPC · JPL
267498	2002 JC_{121}	—	May 5, 2002	Kitt Peak	Spacewatch	·	5.1 km	MPC · JPL
267499	2002 JH_{123}	—	May 6, 2002	Palomar	NEAT	GEF	1.9 km	MPC · JPL
267500	2002 JV_{124}	—	May 6, 2002	Palomar	NEAT	·	2.1 km	MPC · JPL

== 267501–267600 ==
back to top

Designation			Discovery			Properties		Ref
Permanent	Provisional	Named after	Date	Site	Discoverer(s)	Category	Diam.	Ref
267501	2002 JV_{127}	—	May 7, 2002	Palomar	NEAT	GEF	1.7 km	MPC · JPL
267502	2002 JP_{144}	—	May 13, 2002	Palomar	NEAT	·	3.6 km	MPC · JPL
267503	2002 JP_{145}	—	May 14, 2002	Palomar	NEAT	·	3.9 km	MPC · JPL
267504	2002 KJ_{9}	—	May 16, 2002	Haleakala	NEAT	·	1.2 km	MPC · JPL
267505	2002 LL_{50}	—	June 6, 2002	Kitt Peak	Spacewatch	AGN	2.2 km	MPC · JPL
267506	2002 MJ_{1}	—	June 18, 2002	Socorro	LINEAR	T_{j} (2.96)	6.7 km	MPC · JPL
267507	2002 NK_{3}	—	July 8, 2002	Palomar	NEAT	·	2.7 km	MPC · JPL
267508	2002 NN_{8}	—	July 1, 2002	Palomar	NEAT	CYB	4.9 km	MPC · JPL
267509	2002 NH_{12}	—	July 4, 2002	Palomar	NEAT	·	1.1 km	MPC · JPL
267510	2002 NO_{15}	—	July 5, 2002	Socorro	LINEAR	·	760 m	MPC · JPL
267511	2002 NA_{25}	—	July 9, 2002	Socorro	LINEAR	·	3.5 km	MPC · JPL
267512	2002 NX_{34}	—	July 9, 2002	Socorro	LINEAR	·	3.4 km	MPC · JPL
267513	2002 NF_{37}	—	July 9, 2002	Socorro	LINEAR	EOS	2.7 km	MPC · JPL
267514	2002 ND_{44}	—	July 11, 2002	Campo Imperatore	CINEOS	·	730 m	MPC · JPL
267515	2002 NO_{49}	—	July 14, 2002	Palomar	NEAT	·	3.7 km	MPC · JPL
267516	2002 NC_{68}	—	July 3, 2002	Palomar	NEAT	·	2.1 km	MPC · JPL
267517	2002 NQ_{70}	—	July 9, 2002	Palomar	NEAT	·	1.0 km	MPC · JPL
267518	2002 NK_{71}	—	July 8, 2002	Palomar	NEAT	EOS	2.4 km	MPC · JPL
267519	2002 NP_{71}	—	July 8, 2002	Palomar	NEAT	·	3.3 km	MPC · JPL
267520	2002 NU_{71}	—	July 9, 2002	Palomar	NEAT	·	3.7 km	MPC · JPL
267521	2002 NE_{75}	—	April 16, 2001	Kitt Peak	Spacewatch	EOS	2.3 km	MPC · JPL
267522	2002 OZ_{13}	—	July 18, 2002	Socorro	LINEAR	·	3.3 km	MPC · JPL
267523	2002 OA_{16}	—	July 18, 2002	Socorro	LINEAR	·	1.0 km	MPC · JPL
267524	2002 OK_{27}	—	July 22, 2002	Palomar	NEAT	·	2.8 km	MPC · JPL
267525	2002 OH_{31}	—	July 17, 2002	Palomar	NEAT	·	4.0 km	MPC · JPL
267526	2002 PC_{10}	—	August 5, 2002	Palomar	NEAT	·	4.3 km	MPC · JPL
267527	2002 PX_{10}	—	August 5, 2002	Palomar	NEAT	·	2.3 km	MPC · JPL
267528	2002 PO_{14}	—	August 6, 2002	Palomar	NEAT	·	780 m	MPC · JPL
267529	2002 PK_{27}	—	August 6, 2002	Palomar	NEAT	HYG	3.5 km	MPC · JPL
267530	2002 PG_{29}	—	August 6, 2002	Palomar	NEAT	THM	3.1 km	MPC · JPL
267531	2002 PJ_{31}	—	August 6, 2002	Palomar	NEAT	·	4.8 km	MPC · JPL
267532	2002 PK_{50}	—	August 10, 2002	Socorro	LINEAR	·	1.1 km	MPC · JPL
267533	2002 PL_{57}	—	August 9, 2002	Socorro	LINEAR	·	1.3 km	MPC · JPL
267534	2002 PJ_{62}	—	August 8, 2002	Palomar	NEAT	·	1.1 km	MPC · JPL
267535	2002 PD_{67}	—	August 6, 2002	Palomar	NEAT	·	4.3 km	MPC · JPL
267536	2002 PX_{67}	—	August 6, 2002	Palomar	NEAT	·	4.1 km	MPC · JPL
267537	2002 PA_{69}	—	August 10, 2002	Socorro	LINEAR	(194)	3.0 km	MPC · JPL
267538	2002 PC_{71}	—	August 11, 2002	Socorro	LINEAR	·	5.1 km	MPC · JPL
267539	2002 PC_{87}	—	August 4, 2002	Palomar	NEAT	PHO	1.2 km	MPC · JPL
267540	2002 PA_{94}	—	August 11, 2002	Haleakala	NEAT	·	4.8 km	MPC · JPL
267541	2002 PH_{114}	—	August 13, 2002	Kitt Peak	Spacewatch	(8737)	4.2 km	MPC · JPL
267542	2002 PJ_{120}	—	August 13, 2002	Anderson Mesa	LONEOS	·	5.1 km	MPC · JPL
267543	2002 PT_{124}	—	August 13, 2002	Anderson Mesa	LONEOS	·	870 m	MPC · JPL
267544	2002 PY_{127}	—	August 14, 2002	Socorro	LINEAR	·	1.1 km	MPC · JPL
267545	2002 PS_{138}	—	August 11, 2002	Socorro	LINEAR	TIR	5.0 km	MPC · JPL
267546	2002 PG_{158}	—	August 8, 2002	Palomar	S. F. Hönig	·	3.8 km	MPC · JPL
267547	2002 PE_{163}	—	August 8, 2002	Palomar	S. F. Hönig	·	4.0 km	MPC · JPL
267548	2002 PS_{167}	—	August 8, 2002	Palomar	NEAT	(43176)	4.5 km	MPC · JPL
267549	2002 PH_{173}	—	August 8, 2002	Palomar	NEAT	HYG	3.2 km	MPC · JPL
267550	2002 PJ_{174}	—	August 8, 2002	Palomar	NEAT	·	2.8 km	MPC · JPL
267551	2002 PP_{174}	—	August 15, 2002	Palomar	NEAT	EOS	3.3 km	MPC · JPL
267552	2002 PZ_{175}	—	August 15, 2002	Palomar	NEAT	·	5.2 km	MPC · JPL
267553	2002 PV_{176}	—	August 7, 2002	Palomar	NEAT	URS	5.2 km	MPC · JPL
267554	2002 PU_{177}	—	August 15, 2002	Palomar	NEAT	·	880 m	MPC · JPL
267555	2002 PT_{180}	—	August 15, 2002	Palomar	NEAT	EOS	2.7 km	MPC · JPL
267556	2002 PC_{185}	—	August 11, 2002	Palomar	NEAT	·	3.2 km	MPC · JPL
267557	2002 PL_{186}	—	August 11, 2002	Palomar	NEAT	THM	3.8 km	MPC · JPL
267558	2002 QA_{16}	—	August 26, 2002	Palomar	NEAT	H	640 m	MPC · JPL
267559	2002 QS_{23}	—	August 28, 2002	Palomar	NEAT	·	1.3 km	MPC · JPL
267560	2002 QV_{25}	—	August 29, 2002	Kitt Peak	Spacewatch	·	3.5 km	MPC · JPL
267561	2002 QS_{39}	—	August 30, 2002	Palomar	NEAT	·	4.3 km	MPC · JPL
267562	2002 QY_{42}	—	August 30, 2002	Palomar	NEAT	TIR	4.7 km	MPC · JPL
267563	2002 QP_{44}	—	August 30, 2002	Palomar	NEAT	·	6.1 km	MPC · JPL
267564	2002 QJ_{52}	—	August 29, 2002	Palomar	S. F. Hönig	·	4.1 km	MPC · JPL
267565	2002 QM_{52}	—	August 29, 2002	Palomar	S. F. Hönig	·	1.0 km	MPC · JPL
267566	2002 QD_{53}	—	August 29, 2002	Palomar	S. F. Hönig	·	970 m	MPC · JPL
267567	2002 QA_{55}	—	August 29, 2002	Palomar	S. F. Hönig	·	980 m	MPC · JPL
267568	2002 QC_{62}	—	August 27, 2002	Palomar	NEAT	EOS	2.5 km	MPC · JPL
267569	2002 QV_{66}	—	August 30, 2002	Palomar	NEAT	EOS	2.9 km	MPC · JPL
267570	2002 QG_{67}	—	August 16, 2002	Haleakala	NEAT	EOS	3.0 km	MPC · JPL
267571	2002 QS_{73}	—	August 30, 2002	Palomar	NEAT	LUT	5.3 km	MPC · JPL
267572	2002 QT_{74}	—	August 19, 2002	Palomar	NEAT	·	4.0 km	MPC · JPL
267573	2002 QD_{94}	—	August 29, 2002	Palomar	NEAT	·	3.1 km	MPC · JPL
267574	2002 QQ_{96}	—	August 18, 2002	Palomar	NEAT	·	3.2 km	MPC · JPL
267575	2002 QJ_{102}	—	August 20, 2002	Palomar	NEAT	·	4.5 km	MPC · JPL
267576	2002 QM_{102}	—	August 20, 2002	Palomar	NEAT	·	750 m	MPC · JPL
267577	2002 QG_{103}	—	August 28, 2002	Palomar	NEAT	·	2.9 km	MPC · JPL
267578	2002 QG_{106}	—	August 19, 2002	Palomar	NEAT	·	4.8 km	MPC · JPL
267579	2002 QY_{106}	—	August 18, 2002	Palomar	NEAT	·	2.9 km	MPC · JPL
267580	2002 QB_{108}	—	August 17, 2002	Palomar	NEAT	·	3.6 km	MPC · JPL
267581	2002 QO_{110}	—	August 17, 2002	Palomar	NEAT	·	4.8 km	MPC · JPL
267582	2002 QE_{111}	—	August 26, 2002	Palomar	NEAT	·	3.0 km	MPC · JPL
267583	2002 QE_{126}	—	August 20, 2002	Palomar	NEAT	·	4.3 km	MPC · JPL
267584	2002 QU_{128}	—	August 28, 2002	Palomar	NEAT	·	990 m	MPC · JPL
267585 Popluhár	2002 QA_{130}	Popluhár	August 17, 2002	Palomar	NEAT	·	820 m	MPC · JPL
267586	2002 QE_{139}	—	August 17, 2002	Palomar	NEAT	·	2.4 km	MPC · JPL
267587	2002 QO_{141}	—	February 12, 2000	Apache Point	SDSS	·	5.1 km	MPC · JPL
267588	2002 RV_{1}	—	September 4, 2002	Anderson Mesa	LONEOS	·	4.6 km	MPC · JPL
267589	2002 RK_{8}	—	September 3, 2002	Haleakala	NEAT	PHO	1.4 km	MPC · JPL
267590	2002 RZ_{12}	—	September 4, 2002	Anderson Mesa	LONEOS	·	1.9 km	MPC · JPL
267591	2002 RS_{18}	—	September 4, 2002	Anderson Mesa	LONEOS	ERI	2.3 km	MPC · JPL
267592	2002 RS_{23}	—	September 4, 2002	Anderson Mesa	LONEOS	·	4.8 km	MPC · JPL
267593	2002 RQ_{35}	—	September 5, 2002	Anderson Mesa	LONEOS	·	5.7 km	MPC · JPL
267594	2002 RC_{41}	—	September 5, 2002	Socorro	LINEAR	·	2.0 km	MPC · JPL
267595	2002 RR_{44}	—	September 5, 2002	Socorro	LINEAR	·	960 m	MPC · JPL
267596	2002 RO_{47}	—	September 5, 2002	Socorro	LINEAR	·	1.0 km	MPC · JPL
267597	2002 RS_{53}	—	September 5, 2002	Socorro	LINEAR	·	4.5 km	MPC · JPL
267598	2002 RV_{53}	—	September 5, 2002	Socorro	LINEAR	·	1.0 km	MPC · JPL
267599	2002 RY_{59}	—	September 5, 2002	Anderson Mesa	LONEOS	·	1.2 km	MPC · JPL
267600	2002 RL_{69}	—	September 4, 2002	Anderson Mesa	LONEOS	·	4.5 km	MPC · JPL

== 267601–267700 ==
back to top

Designation			Discovery			Properties		Ref
Permanent	Provisional	Named after	Date	Site	Discoverer(s)	Category	Diam.	Ref
267601	2002 RE_{71}	—	September 4, 2002	Palomar	NEAT	·	4.8 km	MPC · JPL
267602	2002 RB_{72}	—	September 5, 2002	Socorro	LINEAR	·	5.8 km	MPC · JPL
267603	2002 RC_{79}	—	September 5, 2002	Socorro	LINEAR	·	850 m	MPC · JPL
267604	2002 RX_{84}	—	September 5, 2002	Socorro	LINEAR	NYS	1.2 km	MPC · JPL
267605	2002 RG_{92}	—	September 5, 2002	Socorro	LINEAR	·	1.4 km	MPC · JPL
267606	2002 RP_{92}	—	September 5, 2002	Socorro	LINEAR	·	1.7 km	MPC · JPL
267607	2002 RH_{105}	—	September 5, 2002	Socorro	LINEAR	·	1.4 km	MPC · JPL
267608	2002 RV_{110}	—	September 6, 2002	Socorro	LINEAR	V	910 m	MPC · JPL
267609	2002 RG_{111}	—	September 6, 2002	Socorro	LINEAR	·	1.5 km	MPC · JPL
267610	2002 RU_{148}	—	September 11, 2002	Palomar	NEAT	ERI	2.7 km	MPC · JPL
267611	2002 RY_{156}	—	September 11, 2002	Palomar	NEAT	VER	3.8 km	MPC · JPL
267612	2002 RT_{158}	—	September 11, 2002	Palomar	NEAT	·	3.6 km	MPC · JPL
267613	2002 RX_{158}	—	September 11, 2002	Palomar	NEAT	·	750 m	MPC · JPL
267614	2002 RM_{162}	—	September 12, 2002	Palomar	NEAT	·	5.5 km	MPC · JPL
267615	2002 RN_{164}	—	September 12, 2002	Palomar	NEAT	·	1.0 km	MPC · JPL
267616	2002 RK_{172}	—	September 13, 2002	Anderson Mesa	LONEOS	·	940 m	MPC · JPL
267617	2002 RP_{189}	—	September 14, 2002	Palomar	NEAT	·	1.3 km	MPC · JPL
267618	2002 RA_{193}	—	September 12, 2002	Palomar	NEAT	·	4.3 km	MPC · JPL
267619	2002 RM_{202}	—	September 13, 2002	Palomar	NEAT	·	1.6 km	MPC · JPL
267620	2002 RK_{217}	—	September 14, 2002	Palomar	NEAT	·	3.7 km	MPC · JPL
267621	2002 RJ_{221}	—	September 15, 2002	Palomar	NEAT	·	4.5 km	MPC · JPL
267622	2002 RW_{222}	—	September 15, 2002	Haleakala	NEAT	·	870 m	MPC · JPL
267623	2002 RN_{224}	—	September 13, 2002	Anderson Mesa	LONEOS	·	4.7 km	MPC · JPL
267624	2002 RU_{227}	—	September 14, 2002	Palomar	NEAT	·	5.5 km	MPC · JPL
267625	2002 RD_{232}	—	September 11, 2002	Wrightwood	J. W. Young	·	4.7 km	MPC · JPL
267626	2002 RG_{237}	—	September 15, 2002	Palomar	R. Matson	·	3.2 km	MPC · JPL
267627	2002 RP_{245}	—	September 1, 2002	Palomar	NEAT	·	4.6 km	MPC · JPL
267628	2002 RA_{252}	—	September 12, 2002	Palomar	NEAT	·	2.9 km	MPC · JPL
267629	2002 RY_{266}	—	September 13, 2002	Palomar	NEAT	·	920 m	MPC · JPL
267630	2002 RW_{268}	—	September 1, 2002	Palomar	NEAT	·	920 m	MPC · JPL
267631	2002 RO_{270}	—	September 4, 2002	Palomar	NEAT	·	1.1 km	MPC · JPL
267632	2002 RN_{281}	—	September 12, 2002	Palomar	NEAT	·	820 m	MPC · JPL
267633	2002 SU_{6}	—	September 27, 2002	Palomar	NEAT	·	890 m	MPC · JPL
267634	2002 SK_{7}	—	September 27, 2002	Palomar	NEAT	·	3.1 km	MPC · JPL
267635	2002 SC_{8}	—	September 27, 2002	Palomar	NEAT	·	800 m	MPC · JPL
267636	2002 ST_{17}	—	September 26, 2002	Palomar	NEAT	NYS	1.2 km	MPC · JPL
267637	2002 SN_{20}	—	September 26, 2002	Palomar	NEAT	·	4.6 km	MPC · JPL
267638	2002 SF_{29}	—	September 28, 2002	Palomar	NEAT	·	1.5 km	MPC · JPL
267639	2002 ST_{37}	—	September 29, 2002	Haleakala	NEAT	·	1.3 km	MPC · JPL
267640	2002 SY_{41}	—	September 28, 2002	Palomar	NEAT	MAS	830 m	MPC · JPL
267641	2002 SQ_{44}	—	September 29, 2002	Haleakala	NEAT	·	920 m	MPC · JPL
267642	2002 SR_{45}	—	September 29, 2002	Kitt Peak	Spacewatch	NYS	1.4 km	MPC · JPL
267643	2002 SS_{66}	—	September 16, 2002	Palomar	NEAT	·	1.2 km	MPC · JPL
267644	2002 SA_{71}	—	September 16, 2002	Palomar	NEAT	·	2.7 km	MPC · JPL
267645	2002 SR_{71}	—	September 17, 2002	Palomar	NEAT	·	1.1 km	MPC · JPL
267646	2002 SL_{72}	—	September 16, 2002	Palomar	NEAT	·	4.6 km	MPC · JPL
267647	2002 TQ	—	October 1, 2002	Anderson Mesa	LONEOS	·	5.6 km	MPC · JPL
267648	2002 TG_{6}	—	October 1, 2002	Socorro	LINEAR	ERI	2.9 km	MPC · JPL
267649	2002 TC_{15}	—	October 1, 2002	Haleakala	NEAT	(1298)	4.2 km	MPC · JPL
267650	2002 TS_{21}	—	October 2, 2002	Socorro	LINEAR	·	1.3 km	MPC · JPL
267651	2002 TQ_{23}	—	October 2, 2002	Socorro	LINEAR	·	1.1 km	MPC · JPL
267652	2002 TX_{35}	—	October 2, 2002	Socorro	LINEAR	·	1.4 km	MPC · JPL
267653	2002 TW_{60}	—	October 3, 2002	Socorro	LINEAR	MAS	800 m	MPC · JPL
267654	2002 TX_{62}	—	October 3, 2002	Campo Imperatore	CINEOS	·	1.4 km	MPC · JPL
267655	2002 TX_{64}	—	October 5, 2002	Palomar	NEAT	·	2.0 km	MPC · JPL
267656	2002 TP_{66}	—	October 4, 2002	Socorro	LINEAR	H	520 m	MPC · JPL
267657	2002 TL_{74}	—	October 3, 2002	Palomar	NEAT	V	930 m	MPC · JPL
267658	2002 TV_{86}	—	October 3, 2002	Socorro	LINEAR	·	5.6 km	MPC · JPL
267659	2002 TU_{98}	—	October 3, 2002	Socorro	LINEAR	·	3.3 km	MPC · JPL
267660	2002 TP_{99}	—	October 4, 2002	Palomar	NEAT	·	4.8 km	MPC · JPL
267661	2002 TW_{125}	—	October 4, 2002	Socorro	LINEAR	·	1.1 km	MPC · JPL
267662	2002 TQ_{139}	—	October 4, 2002	Anderson Mesa	LONEOS	TIR	4.7 km	MPC · JPL
267663	2002 TM_{142}	—	October 3, 2002	Socorro	LINEAR	·	1.6 km	MPC · JPL
267664	2002 TK_{186}	—	October 4, 2002	Socorro	LINEAR	·	1.4 km	MPC · JPL
267665	2002 TL_{229}	—	October 7, 2002	Socorro	LINEAR	·	1.0 km	MPC · JPL
267666	2002 TM_{249}	—	October 7, 2002	Socorro	LINEAR	(2076)	950 m	MPC · JPL
267667	2002 TK_{257}	—	October 9, 2002	Socorro	LINEAR	·	1.6 km	MPC · JPL
267668	2002 TQ_{262}	—	October 10, 2002	Palomar	NEAT	PHO	3.3 km	MPC · JPL
267669	2002 TK_{271}	—	October 9, 2002	Socorro	LINEAR	·	1.1 km	MPC · JPL
267670	2002 TA_{272}	—	October 9, 2002	Socorro	LINEAR	·	1.6 km	MPC · JPL
267671	2002 TZ_{289}	—	October 10, 2002	Socorro	LINEAR	·	1.7 km	MPC · JPL
267672	2002 TO_{307}	—	October 4, 2002	Apache Point	SDSS	·	1.5 km	MPC · JPL
267673	2002 TA_{310}	—	October 4, 2002	Apache Point	SDSS	V	800 m	MPC · JPL
267674	2002 TQ_{310}	—	October 4, 2002	Apache Point	SDSS	·	3.8 km	MPC · JPL
267675	2002 TF_{318}	—	October 5, 2002	Apache Point	SDSS	·	810 m	MPC · JPL
267676	2002 TG_{348}	—	October 5, 2002	Apache Point	SDSS	·	4.4 km	MPC · JPL
267677	2002 TG_{385}	—	October 3, 2002	Palomar	NEAT	EOS	3.1 km	MPC · JPL
267678	2002 UL_{2}	—	October 28, 2002	Socorro	LINEAR	H	650 m	MPC · JPL
267679	2002 UA_{8}	—	October 28, 2002	Palomar	NEAT	·	2.7 km	MPC · JPL
267680	2002 UW_{10}	—	October 28, 2002	Palomar	NEAT	NYS	1.3 km	MPC · JPL
267681	2002 UV_{18}	—	October 30, 2002	Kitt Peak	Spacewatch	MAS	760 m	MPC · JPL
267682	2002 UX_{20}	—	October 28, 2002	Haleakala	NEAT	·	1.2 km	MPC · JPL
267683	2002 UU_{24}	—	October 29, 2002	Kitt Peak	Spacewatch	·	1.1 km	MPC · JPL
267684	2002 UB_{30}	—	October 30, 2002	Kitt Peak	Spacewatch	·	910 m	MPC · JPL
267685	2002 UD_{33}	—	October 31, 2002	Palomar	NEAT	·	1.3 km	MPC · JPL
267686	2002 VT_{4}	—	November 4, 2002	Palomar	NEAT	·	970 m	MPC · JPL
267687	2002 VY_{22}	—	November 5, 2002	Socorro	LINEAR	·	1.6 km	MPC · JPL
267688	2002 VJ_{37}	—	November 4, 2002	Palomar	NEAT	·	1.7 km	MPC · JPL
267689	2002 VL_{79}	—	November 7, 2002	Socorro	LINEAR	NYS	1.3 km	MPC · JPL
267690	2002 VN_{88}	—	November 11, 2002	Socorro	LINEAR	·	1.3 km	MPC · JPL
267691	2002 VQ_{97}	—	November 12, 2002	Socorro	LINEAR	·	1.5 km	MPC · JPL
267692	2002 VH_{113}	—	November 13, 2002	Palomar	NEAT	NYS	1.9 km	MPC · JPL
267693	2002 VC_{135}	—	November 7, 2002	Socorro	LINEAR	·	1.6 km	MPC · JPL
267694	2002 WP_{4}	—	November 25, 2002	Palomar	NEAT	V	900 m	MPC · JPL
267695	2002 WA_{8}	—	November 24, 2002	Palomar	NEAT	·	1.7 km	MPC · JPL
267696	2002 XD_{19}	—	December 2, 2002	Socorro	LINEAR	·	1.4 km	MPC · JPL
267697	2002 XY_{30}	—	December 6, 2002	Socorro	LINEAR	·	2.2 km	MPC · JPL
267698	2002 XW_{43}	—	December 6, 2002	Socorro	LINEAR	·	1.8 km	MPC · JPL
267699	2002 XH_{68}	—	December 12, 2002	Palomar	NEAT	·	1.4 km	MPC · JPL
267700	2002 XA_{74}	—	December 11, 2002	Socorro	LINEAR	·	1.6 km	MPC · JPL

== 267701–267800 ==
back to top

Designation			Discovery			Properties		Ref
Permanent	Provisional	Named after	Date	Site	Discoverer(s)	Category	Diam.	Ref
267701	2002 XA_{104}	—	December 5, 2002	Socorro	LINEAR	·	1.6 km	MPC · JPL
267702	2002 XK_{110}	—	December 6, 2002	Socorro	LINEAR	·	1.4 km	MPC · JPL
267703	2002 XD_{118}	—	December 10, 2002	Palomar	NEAT	·	1.5 km	MPC · JPL
267704	2002 YM_{28}	—	December 31, 2002	Socorro	LINEAR	·	1.5 km	MPC · JPL
267705	2003 AA_{23}	—	January 7, 2003	Socorro	LINEAR	H	780 m	MPC · JPL
267706	2003 AJ_{36}	—	January 7, 2003	Socorro	LINEAR	·	2.0 km	MPC · JPL
267707	2003 AT_{38}	—	January 7, 2003	Socorro	LINEAR	H	820 m	MPC · JPL
267708	2003 AV_{56}	—	January 5, 2003	Socorro	LINEAR	·	1.7 km	MPC · JPL
267709	2003 AB_{57}	—	January 5, 2003	Socorro	LINEAR	·	1.8 km	MPC · JPL
267710	2003 AQ_{57}	—	January 5, 2003	Socorro	LINEAR	H	670 m	MPC · JPL
267711	2003 AM_{91}	—	January 5, 2003	Socorro	LINEAR	·	5.0 km	MPC · JPL
267712	2003 BZ_{8}	—	January 26, 2003	Anderson Mesa	LONEOS	EUN	1.7 km	MPC · JPL
267713	2003 BU_{10}	—	January 26, 2003	Anderson Mesa	LONEOS	·	2.2 km	MPC · JPL
267714	2003 BS_{19}	—	January 26, 2003	Haleakala	NEAT	T_{j} (2.96) · 3:2	5.8 km	MPC · JPL
267715	2003 BC_{36}	—	January 26, 2003	Kitt Peak	Spacewatch	·	1.7 km	MPC · JPL
267716	2003 BS_{37}	—	January 29, 2003	Kitt Peak	Spacewatch	H	710 m	MPC · JPL
267717	2003 BZ_{47}	—	January 31, 2003	Socorro	LINEAR	T_{j} (2.98) · 3:2	7.1 km	MPC · JPL
267718	2003 BE_{61}	—	January 27, 2003	Haleakala	NEAT	(5)	1.5 km	MPC · JPL
267719	2003 BX_{91}	—	January 24, 2003	Palomar	NEAT	T_{j} (2.97) · 3:2	5.0 km	MPC · JPL
267720	2003 CA	—	February 1, 2003	Socorro	LINEAR	APO · PHA	590 m	MPC · JPL
267721	2003 CL_{11}	—	February 4, 2003	Socorro	LINEAR	H	770 m	MPC · JPL
267722	2003 DD_{14}	—	February 26, 2003	Socorro	LINEAR	H	970 m	MPC · JPL
267723	2003 ED_{3}	—	March 6, 2003	Socorro	LINEAR	·	1.8 km	MPC · JPL
267724	2003 EY_{11}	—	March 6, 2003	Socorro	LINEAR	·	1.6 km	MPC · JPL
267725	2003 EV_{17}	—	March 6, 2003	Cima Ekar	ADAS	·	1.9 km	MPC · JPL
267726	2003 EG_{57}	—	March 9, 2003	Anderson Mesa	LONEOS	·	4.0 km	MPC · JPL
267727	2003 EX_{58}	—	March 12, 2003	Socorro	LINEAR	PHO	2.6 km	MPC · JPL
267728	2003 EG_{59}	—	March 12, 2003	Socorro	LINEAR	·	3.0 km	MPC · JPL
267729	2003 FC_{5}	—	March 27, 2003	Socorro	LINEAR	APO · PHA · slow	720 m	MPC · JPL
267730	2003 FL_{8}	—	March 29, 2003	Anderson Mesa	LONEOS	H	760 m	MPC · JPL
267731	2003 FK_{21}	—	March 24, 2003	Kitt Peak	Spacewatch	·	1.5 km	MPC · JPL
267732	2003 FN_{37}	—	March 23, 2003	Kitt Peak	Spacewatch	·	1.9 km	MPC · JPL
267733	2003 FF_{61}	—	March 26, 2003	Palomar	NEAT	·	1.5 km	MPC · JPL
267734	2003 FO_{62}	—	March 26, 2003	Kitt Peak	Spacewatch	·	1.5 km	MPC · JPL
267735	2003 FP_{69}	—	March 26, 2003	Palomar	NEAT	·	1.1 km	MPC · JPL
267736	2003 FD_{78}	—	March 27, 2003	Catalina	CSS	BRG	1.7 km	MPC · JPL
267737	2003 FB_{91}	—	March 29, 2003	Anderson Mesa	LONEOS	·	2.3 km	MPC · JPL
267738	2003 FS_{92}	—	March 29, 2003	Anderson Mesa	LONEOS	·	1.5 km	MPC · JPL
267739	2003 FM_{104}	—	March 25, 2003	Kitt Peak	Spacewatch	·	1.6 km	MPC · JPL
267740	2003 FZ_{105}	—	March 26, 2003	Palomar	NEAT	·	1.8 km	MPC · JPL
267741	2003 FX_{107}	—	March 31, 2003	Anderson Mesa	LONEOS	·	1.5 km	MPC · JPL
267742	2003 FG_{115}	—	March 31, 2003	Kitt Peak	Spacewatch	·	2.2 km	MPC · JPL
267743	2003 FQ_{117}	—	March 25, 2003	Palomar	NEAT	·	1.4 km	MPC · JPL
267744	2003 GZ_{25}	—	April 4, 2003	Kitt Peak	Spacewatch	·	1.5 km	MPC · JPL
267745	2003 GR_{35}	—	April 5, 2003	Anderson Mesa	LONEOS	·	5.7 km	MPC · JPL
267746	2003 GH_{36}	—	April 5, 2003	Anderson Mesa	LONEOS	·	3.9 km	MPC · JPL
267747	2003 GT_{38}	—	April 7, 2003	Kitt Peak	Spacewatch	·	1.6 km	MPC · JPL
267748	2003 GR_{50}	—	April 8, 2003	Haleakala	NEAT	·	1.6 km	MPC · JPL
267749	2003 HO_{8}	—	April 25, 2003	Anderson Mesa	LONEOS	·	2.3 km	MPC · JPL
267750	2003 HL_{22}	—	April 24, 2003	Anderson Mesa	LONEOS	·	1.7 km	MPC · JPL
267751	2003 HL_{26}	—	April 26, 2003	Kitt Peak	Spacewatch	·	1.6 km	MPC · JPL
267752	2003 JS_{1}	—	May 1, 2003	Socorro	LINEAR	BRG	1.8 km	MPC · JPL
267753	2003 JK_{17}	—	May 9, 2003	Socorro	LINEAR	·	2.8 km	MPC · JPL
267754	2003 KG_{9}	—	May 26, 2003	Haleakala	NEAT	·	3.9 km	MPC · JPL
267755	2003 KY_{12}	—	May 27, 2003	Kitt Peak	Spacewatch	·	2.6 km	MPC · JPL
267756	2003 LH_{2}	—	June 2, 2003	Kitt Peak	Spacewatch	JUN	1.5 km	MPC · JPL
267757	2003 LJ_{3}	—	June 4, 2003	Kitt Peak	Spacewatch	·	2.0 km	MPC · JPL
267758	2003 MJ_{1}	—	June 22, 2003	Socorro	LINEAR	·	2.0 km	MPC · JPL
267759	2003 MC_{7}	—	June 28, 2003	Anderson Mesa	LONEOS	AMO	590 m	MPC · JPL
267760	2003 NG_{10}	—	July 3, 2003	Kitt Peak	Spacewatch	·	2.8 km	MPC · JPL
267761	2003 OQ_{16}	—	July 26, 2003	Palomar	NEAT	·	2.6 km	MPC · JPL
267762	2003 PK_{5}	—	August 4, 2003	Socorro	LINEAR	(13314)	2.5 km	MPC · JPL
267763	2003 QT_{9}	—	August 22, 2003	Socorro	LINEAR	·	3.2 km	MPC · JPL
267764	2003 QX_{30}	—	August 23, 2003	Črni Vrh	Skvarč, J.	GAL	2.2 km	MPC · JPL
267765	2003 QC_{58}	—	August 23, 2003	Socorro	LINEAR	·	3.6 km	MPC · JPL
267766	2003 QP_{94}	—	August 28, 2003	Haleakala	NEAT	·	2.9 km	MPC · JPL
267767	2003 RJ_{10}	—	September 3, 2003	Wrightwood	J. W. Young, Grigsby, A.	GEF	1.6 km	MPC · JPL
267768	2003 RX_{20}	—	September 15, 2003	Anderson Mesa	LONEOS	KOR	2.6 km	MPC · JPL
267769	2003 SO_{14}	—	September 17, 2003	Kitt Peak	Spacewatch	TIR	2.1 km	MPC · JPL
267770	2003 SK_{23}	—	September 16, 2003	Haleakala	NEAT	·	4.5 km	MPC · JPL
267771	2003 SE_{32}	—	September 16, 2003	Palomar	NEAT	·	5.4 km	MPC · JPL
267772	2003 SB_{70}	—	September 17, 2003	Kitt Peak	Spacewatch	KOR	2.5 km	MPC · JPL
267773	2003 SB_{74}	—	September 18, 2003	Kitt Peak	Spacewatch	·	4.7 km	MPC · JPL
267774	2003 SB_{82}	—	September 17, 2003	Kitt Peak	Spacewatch	·	5.0 km	MPC · JPL
267775	2003 SH_{82}	—	September 17, 2003	Kitt Peak	Spacewatch	EUP	4.8 km	MPC · JPL
267776	2003 SK_{87}	—	September 17, 2003	Socorro	LINEAR	·	3.5 km	MPC · JPL
267777	2003 SO_{89}	—	September 18, 2003	Palomar	NEAT	·	3.1 km	MPC · JPL
267778	2003 SR_{93}	—	September 18, 2003	Palomar	NEAT	EOS	2.6 km	MPC · JPL
267779	2003 SO_{104}	—	September 20, 2003	Haleakala	NEAT	·	3.3 km	MPC · JPL
267780	2003 SF_{120}	—	September 17, 2003	Kitt Peak	Spacewatch	HYG	2.7 km	MPC · JPL
267781	2003 SO_{151}	—	September 18, 2003	Socorro	LINEAR	EOS	3.6 km	MPC · JPL
267782	2003 SQ_{155}	—	September 19, 2003	Anderson Mesa	LONEOS	·	1.0 km	MPC · JPL
267783	2003 SX_{160}	—	September 17, 2003	Kitt Peak	Spacewatch	·	2.3 km	MPC · JPL
267784	2003 SC_{162}	—	September 18, 2003	Kitt Peak	Spacewatch	EOS	4.3 km	MPC · JPL
267785	2003 SH_{162}	—	September 19, 2003	Socorro	LINEAR	EOS	2.7 km	MPC · JPL
267786	2003 SN_{168}	—	September 23, 2003	Haleakala	NEAT	·	4.0 km	MPC · JPL
267787	2003 ST_{182}	—	September 20, 2003	Campo Imperatore	CINEOS	·	4.1 km	MPC · JPL
267788	2003 SM_{186}	—	September 22, 2003	Anderson Mesa	LONEOS	·	3.6 km	MPC · JPL
267789	2003 SE_{191}	—	September 18, 2003	Palomar	NEAT	·	3.3 km	MPC · JPL
267790	2003 SZ_{202}	—	September 22, 2003	Anderson Mesa	LONEOS	·	5.0 km	MPC · JPL
267791	2003 SK_{204}	—	September 22, 2003	Socorro	LINEAR	TIR	5.6 km	MPC · JPL
267792	2003 SF_{213}	—	September 26, 2003	Palomar	NEAT	·	2.8 km	MPC · JPL
267793	2003 SH_{218}	—	September 28, 2003	Desert Eagle	W. K. Y. Yeung	·	4.0 km	MPC · JPL
267794	2003 SM_{246}	—	September 26, 2003	Socorro	LINEAR	EOS	3.0 km	MPC · JPL
267795	2003 SM_{250}	—	September 26, 2003	Socorro	LINEAR	·	5.8 km	MPC · JPL
267796	2003 SM_{257}	—	September 28, 2003	Socorro	LINEAR	·	2.5 km	MPC · JPL
267797	2003 SZ_{263}	—	September 28, 2003	Socorro	LINEAR	EOS	3.1 km	MPC · JPL
267798	2003 SW_{271}	—	September 26, 2003	Goodricke-Pigott	R. A. Tucker	EOS	2.7 km	MPC · JPL
267799	2003 SZ_{275}	—	September 29, 2003	Socorro	LINEAR	slow	4.8 km	MPC · JPL
267800	2003 SK_{279}	—	September 17, 2003	Socorro	LINEAR	·	4.5 km	MPC · JPL

== 267801–267900 ==
back to top

Designation			Discovery			Properties		Ref
Permanent	Provisional	Named after	Date	Site	Discoverer(s)	Category	Diam.	Ref
267801	2003 SB_{280}	—	September 18, 2003	Palomar	NEAT	·	3.4 km	MPC · JPL
267802	2003 SZ_{281}	—	September 19, 2003	Palomar	NEAT	·	3.6 km	MPC · JPL
267803	2003 SJ_{289}	—	September 28, 2003	Socorro	LINEAR	EOS	2.2 km	MPC · JPL
267804	2003 SX_{311}	—	September 29, 2003	Kitt Peak	Spacewatch	·	1.1 km	MPC · JPL
267805	2003 SF_{318}	—	September 16, 2003	Kitt Peak	Spacewatch	·	1.8 km	MPC · JPL
267806	2003 SJ_{322}	—	September 28, 2003	Anderson Mesa	LONEOS	EOS	3.2 km	MPC · JPL
267807	2003 ST_{342}	—	September 17, 2003	Kitt Peak	Spacewatch	·	2.6 km	MPC · JPL
267808	2003 SQ_{422}	—	September 28, 2003	Anderson Mesa	LONEOS	·	3.2 km	MPC · JPL
267809	2003 SQ_{430}	—	September 22, 2003	Kitt Peak	Spacewatch	·	3.2 km	MPC · JPL
267810	2003 TM_{16}	—	October 15, 2003	Anderson Mesa	LONEOS	URS	4.7 km	MPC · JPL
267811	2003 TC_{17}	—	October 14, 2003	Anderson Mesa	LONEOS	EOS	3.2 km	MPC · JPL
267812	2003 TX_{19}	—	October 14, 2003	Anderson Mesa	LONEOS	fast	780 m	MPC · JPL
267813	2003 TZ_{19}	—	October 5, 2003	Kitt Peak	Spacewatch	EOS ·	5.2 km	MPC · JPL
267814	2003 TK_{35}	—	October 1, 2003	Kitt Peak	Spacewatch	HYG	3.7 km	MPC · JPL
267815	2003 TR_{55}	—	October 5, 2003	Kitt Peak	Spacewatch	EOS	2.7 km	MPC · JPL
267816	2003 UB_{14}	—	October 16, 2003	Kitt Peak	Spacewatch	EOS	2.4 km	MPC · JPL
267817	2003 UZ_{15}	—	October 16, 2003	Anderson Mesa	LONEOS	·	4.8 km	MPC · JPL
267818	2003 UP_{16}	—	October 16, 2003	Anderson Mesa	LONEOS	THM	3.1 km	MPC · JPL
267819	2003 UB_{33}	—	October 16, 2003	Kitt Peak	Spacewatch	·	4.1 km	MPC · JPL
267820	2003 UE_{34}	—	October 17, 2003	Kitt Peak	Spacewatch	·	5.1 km	MPC · JPL
267821	2003 UB_{35}	—	October 27, 2003	Socorro	LINEAR	·	830 m	MPC · JPL
267822	2003 UT_{40}	—	October 16, 2003	Anderson Mesa	LONEOS	·	3.3 km	MPC · JPL
267823	2003 UK_{47}	—	October 20, 2003	Goodricke-Pigott	R. A. Tucker	·	3.5 km	MPC · JPL
267824	2003 UK_{55}	—	October 18, 2003	Palomar	NEAT	·	1.0 km	MPC · JPL
267825	2003 UR_{63}	—	October 16, 2003	Palomar	NEAT	·	3.4 km	MPC · JPL
267826	2003 UW_{74}	—	October 17, 2003	Anderson Mesa	LONEOS	·	3.0 km	MPC · JPL
267827	2003 UO_{78}	—	October 18, 2003	Kitt Peak	Spacewatch	·	3.3 km	MPC · JPL
267828	2003 UL_{82}	—	October 19, 2003	Kitt Peak	Spacewatch	·	2.9 km	MPC · JPL
267829	2003 UX_{93}	—	October 18, 2003	Kitt Peak	Spacewatch	·	4.2 km	MPC · JPL
267830	2003 UJ_{117}	—	October 21, 2003	Socorro	LINEAR	EOS	3.1 km	MPC · JPL
267831	2003 UV_{120}	—	October 18, 2003	Kitt Peak	Spacewatch	·	4.6 km	MPC · JPL
267832	2003 UQ_{127}	—	October 21, 2003	Kitt Peak	Spacewatch	EOS ·	6.3 km	MPC · JPL
267833	2003 UN_{133}	—	October 20, 2003	Socorro	LINEAR	LIX	4.8 km	MPC · JPL
267834	2003 UC_{135}	—	October 21, 2003	Anderson Mesa	LONEOS	·	2.9 km	MPC · JPL
267835	2003 UM_{140}	—	October 16, 2003	Anderson Mesa	LONEOS	·	3.3 km	MPC · JPL
267836	2003 UV_{147}	—	October 18, 2003	Palomar	NEAT	·	3.3 km	MPC · JPL
267837	2003 UG_{152}	—	October 21, 2003	Kitt Peak	Spacewatch	·	790 m	MPC · JPL
267838	2003 UR_{160}	—	October 21, 2003	Kitt Peak	Spacewatch	·	4.1 km	MPC · JPL
267839	2003 UP_{196}	—	October 21, 2003	Kitt Peak	Spacewatch	EOS	2.3 km	MPC · JPL
267840	2003 UR_{197}	—	October 21, 2003	Anderson Mesa	LONEOS	·	2.7 km	MPC · JPL
267841	2003 UR_{204}	—	October 22, 2003	Kitt Peak	Spacewatch	·	3.3 km	MPC · JPL
267842	2003 UM_{212}	—	October 23, 2003	Kitt Peak	Spacewatch	·	950 m	MPC · JPL
267843	2003 UR_{214}	—	October 21, 2003	Anderson Mesa	LONEOS	·	760 m	MPC · JPL
267844	2003 UX_{224}	—	October 22, 2003	Kitt Peak	Spacewatch	·	5.2 km	MPC · JPL
267845	2003 US_{226}	—	October 22, 2003	Kitt Peak	Spacewatch	·	3.8 km	MPC · JPL
267846	2003 UC_{228}	—	October 23, 2003	Kitt Peak	Spacewatch	·	4.0 km	MPC · JPL
267847	2003 UH_{236}	—	October 22, 2003	Kitt Peak	Spacewatch	·	3.9 km	MPC · JPL
267848	2003 UJ_{248}	—	October 25, 2003	Socorro	LINEAR	·	3.0 km	MPC · JPL
267849	2003 UK_{262}	—	October 26, 2003	Haleakala	NEAT	·	1.0 km	MPC · JPL
267850	2003 UX_{278}	—	October 25, 2003	Socorro	LINEAR	·	5.8 km	MPC · JPL
267851	2003 UF_{283}	—	October 29, 2003	Anderson Mesa	LONEOS	·	3.6 km	MPC · JPL
267852	2003 UJ_{283}	—	October 30, 2003	Kitt Peak	Deep Lens Survey	·	610 m	MPC · JPL
267853	2003 UL_{283}	—	October 30, 2003	Socorro	LINEAR	·	4.8 km	MPC · JPL
267854	2003 UG_{318}	—	October 16, 2003	Palomar	NEAT	EOS ·	3.8 km	MPC · JPL
267855	2003 VR_{2}	—	November 14, 2003	Palomar	NEAT	·	790 m	MPC · JPL
267856	2003 VL_{5}	—	November 15, 2003	Kitt Peak	Spacewatch	·	4.7 km	MPC · JPL
267857	2003 VU_{10}	—	November 15, 2003	Kitt Peak	Spacewatch	THM	2.8 km	MPC · JPL
267858	2003 WJ_{5}	—	November 18, 2003	Palomar	NEAT	·	3.4 km	MPC · JPL
267859	2003 WH_{9}	—	November 18, 2003	Kitt Peak	Spacewatch	EOS	3.0 km	MPC · JPL
267860	2003 WV_{27}	—	November 16, 2003	Kitt Peak	Spacewatch	HYG	2.8 km	MPC · JPL
267861	2003 WA_{31}	—	November 18, 2003	Palomar	NEAT	·	5.6 km	MPC · JPL
267862	2003 WM_{36}	—	November 19, 2003	Kitt Peak	Spacewatch	·	3.1 km	MPC · JPL
267863	2003 WW_{40}	—	November 19, 2003	Kitt Peak	Spacewatch	·	680 m	MPC · JPL
267864	2003 WG_{80}	—	November 20, 2003	Socorro	LINEAR	·	2.6 km	MPC · JPL
267865	2003 WK_{84}	—	November 19, 2003	Socorro	LINEAR	EOS	3.3 km	MPC · JPL
267866	2003 WM_{103}	—	November 21, 2003	Socorro	LINEAR	·	5.9 km	MPC · JPL
267867	2003 WJ_{110}	—	November 20, 2003	Socorro	LINEAR	·	890 m	MPC · JPL
267868	2003 WC_{112}	—	November 20, 2003	Socorro	LINEAR	VER	4.0 km	MPC · JPL
267869	2003 WC_{115}	—	November 20, 2003	Socorro	LINEAR	·	4.9 km	MPC · JPL
267870	2003 WU_{147}	—	November 23, 2003	Kitt Peak	Spacewatch	·	1.0 km	MPC · JPL
267871	2003 WW_{152}	—	November 26, 2003	Socorro	LINEAR	PHO	1.5 km	MPC · JPL
267872	2003 WD_{157}	—	November 29, 2003	Kingsnake	J. V. McClusky	THB	5.0 km	MPC · JPL
267873	2003 WS_{162}	—	November 30, 2003	Kitt Peak	Spacewatch	HYG	4.3 km	MPC · JPL
267874	2003 WE_{164}	—	November 30, 2003	Kitt Peak	Spacewatch	·	730 m	MPC · JPL
267875	2003 WM_{168}	—	November 19, 2003	Palomar	NEAT	EOS	5.3 km	MPC · JPL
267876	2003 XD_{23}	—	December 1, 2003	Kitt Peak	Spacewatch	·	3.2 km	MPC · JPL
267877	2003 XX_{31}	—	December 1, 2003	Kitt Peak	Spacewatch	·	3.0 km	MPC · JPL
267878	2003 YY_{17}	—	December 16, 2003	Anderson Mesa	LONEOS	·	1.9 km	MPC · JPL
267879	2003 YL_{28}	—	December 17, 2003	Palomar	NEAT	·	1.1 km	MPC · JPL
267880	2003 YM_{34}	—	December 18, 2003	Socorro	LINEAR	·	760 m	MPC · JPL
267881	2003 YS_{34}	—	December 18, 2003	Socorro	LINEAR	·	940 m	MPC · JPL
267882	2003 YG_{35}	—	December 19, 2003	Kitt Peak	Spacewatch	·	970 m	MPC · JPL
267883	2003 YT_{59}	—	December 19, 2003	Socorro	LINEAR	·	1.1 km	MPC · JPL
267884	2003 YH_{69}	—	December 20, 2003	Socorro	LINEAR	PHO	1.3 km	MPC · JPL
267885	2003 YR_{74}	—	December 18, 2003	Socorro	LINEAR	·	1.3 km	MPC · JPL
267886	2003 YH_{76}	—	December 18, 2003	Socorro	LINEAR	·	890 m	MPC · JPL
267887	2003 YB_{93}	—	December 21, 2003	Socorro	LINEAR	·	950 m	MPC · JPL
267888	2003 YZ_{109}	—	December 23, 2003	Socorro	LINEAR	HYG	3.5 km	MPC · JPL
267889	2003 YO_{124}	—	December 28, 2003	Kitt Peak	Spacewatch	·	910 m	MPC · JPL
267890	2003 YN_{137}	—	December 27, 2003	Kitt Peak	Spacewatch	·	920 m	MPC · JPL
267891	2003 YW_{158}	—	December 17, 2003	Socorro	LINEAR	EOS	3.6 km	MPC · JPL
267892	2003 YP_{174}	—	December 19, 2003	Socorro	LINEAR	·	900 m	MPC · JPL
267893	2003 YX_{180}	—	December 18, 2003	Socorro	LINEAR	·	980 m	MPC · JPL
267894	2004 BC_{3}	—	January 16, 2004	Palomar	NEAT	·	1.1 km	MPC · JPL
267895	2004 BY_{3}	—	January 16, 2004	Palomar	NEAT	·	750 m	MPC · JPL
267896	2004 BV_{39}	—	January 21, 2004	Socorro	LINEAR	·	690 m	MPC · JPL
267897	2004 BL_{49}	—	January 21, 2004	Socorro	LINEAR	·	860 m	MPC · JPL
267898	2004 BB_{53}	—	January 22, 2004	Palomar	NEAT	·	770 m	MPC · JPL
267899	2004 BS_{59}	—	January 21, 2004	Kitt Peak	Spacewatch	BAP	1.1 km	MPC · JPL
267900	2004 BE_{98}	—	January 27, 2004	Kitt Peak	Spacewatch	·	1.4 km	MPC · JPL

== 267901–268000 ==
back to top

Designation			Discovery			Properties		Ref
Permanent	Provisional	Named after	Date	Site	Discoverer(s)	Category	Diam.	Ref
267901	2004 BX_{106}	—	January 27, 2004	Socorro	LINEAR	·	1.0 km	MPC · JPL
267902	2004 BX_{108}	—	January 28, 2004	Catalina	CSS	·	1.2 km	MPC · JPL
267903	2004 BV_{110}	—	January 28, 2004	Kitt Peak	Spacewatch	·	1.1 km	MPC · JPL
267904	2004 BX_{114}	—	January 29, 2004	Socorro	LINEAR	·	1.8 km	MPC · JPL
267905	2004 BJ_{137}	—	January 19, 2004	Kitt Peak	Spacewatch	(2076)	990 m	MPC · JPL
267906	2004 BZ_{157}	—	January 28, 2004	Kitt Peak	Spacewatch	·	750 m	MPC · JPL
267907	2004 CU_{5}	—	February 10, 2004	Palomar	NEAT	·	1.2 km	MPC · JPL
267908	2004 CJ_{10}	—	February 11, 2004	Anderson Mesa	LONEOS	·	640 m	MPC · JPL
267909	2004 CQ_{23}	—	February 12, 2004	Kitt Peak	Spacewatch	·	1.0 km	MPC · JPL
267910	2004 CL_{28}	—	February 12, 2004	Kitt Peak	Spacewatch	·	870 m	MPC · JPL
267911	2004 CS_{61}	—	February 11, 2004	Kitt Peak	Spacewatch	·	830 m	MPC · JPL
267912	2004 CC_{68}	—	February 10, 2004	Palomar	NEAT	·	1.1 km	MPC · JPL
267913	2004 CU_{72}	—	February 13, 2004	Kitt Peak	Spacewatch	·	860 m	MPC · JPL
267914	2004 CN_{73}	—	February 14, 2004	Haleakala	NEAT	(2076)	1.1 km	MPC · JPL
267915	2004 CR_{77}	—	February 11, 2004	Palomar	NEAT	·	1.2 km	MPC · JPL
267916	2004 CP_{95}	—	February 13, 2004	Kitt Peak	Spacewatch	·	1.1 km	MPC · JPL
267917	2004 CH_{99}	—	February 15, 2004	Catalina	CSS	·	1.1 km	MPC · JPL
267918	2004 CT_{107}	—	February 14, 2004	Kitt Peak	Spacewatch	ERI	1.9 km	MPC · JPL
267919	2004 CQ_{117}	—	February 11, 2004	Palomar	NEAT	(2076)	1.1 km	MPC · JPL
267920	2004 CV_{123}	—	February 12, 2004	Kitt Peak	Spacewatch	·	650 m	MPC · JPL
267921	2004 DC_{7}	—	February 16, 2004	Kitt Peak	Spacewatch	V	980 m	MPC · JPL
267922	2004 DZ_{10}	—	February 16, 2004	Kitt Peak	Spacewatch	·	1.1 km	MPC · JPL
267923	2004 DQ_{22}	—	February 18, 2004	Socorro	LINEAR	(2076)	1.1 km	MPC · JPL
267924	2004 DA_{25}	—	February 17, 2004	Socorro	LINEAR	·	1.1 km	MPC · JPL
267925	2004 DR_{27}	—	February 16, 2004	Kitt Peak	Spacewatch	V	990 m	MPC · JPL
267926	2004 DU_{33}	—	February 18, 2004	Socorro	LINEAR	·	1.3 km	MPC · JPL
267927	2004 DA_{38}	—	February 19, 2004	Socorro	LINEAR	PHO	1.6 km	MPC · JPL
267928	2004 DZ_{39}	—	February 17, 2004	Kitt Peak	Spacewatch	V	820 m	MPC · JPL
267929	2004 DC_{43}	—	February 23, 2004	Socorro	LINEAR	·	880 m	MPC · JPL
267930	2004 DC_{44}	—	February 16, 2004	Socorro	LINEAR	V	890 m	MPC · JPL
267931	2004 DX_{48}	—	February 19, 2004	Socorro	LINEAR	V	850 m	MPC · JPL
267932	2004 DR_{51}	—	February 23, 2004	Socorro	LINEAR	·	1.5 km	MPC · JPL
267933	2004 DF_{59}	—	February 23, 2004	Socorro	LINEAR	·	1.3 km	MPC · JPL
267934	2004 DC_{63}	—	February 29, 2004	Kitt Peak	Spacewatch	·	1.2 km	MPC · JPL
267935	2004 EF_{4}	—	March 11, 2004	Palomar	NEAT	PHO	1.3 km	MPC · JPL
267936	2004 EB_{9}	—	March 14, 2004	Palomar	NEAT	ERI	2.7 km	MPC · JPL
267937	2004 EE_{10}	—	March 13, 2004	Palomar	NEAT	·	1.1 km	MPC · JPL
267938	2004 EQ_{19}	—	March 14, 2004	Kitt Peak	Spacewatch	·	1.1 km	MPC · JPL
267939	2004 EC_{20}	—	March 14, 2004	Catalina	CSS	V	740 m	MPC · JPL
267940	2004 EM_{20}	—	March 15, 2004	Socorro	LINEAR	APO	300 m	MPC · JPL
267941	2004 EN_{22}	—	March 15, 2004	Campo Imperatore	CINEOS	·	1.3 km	MPC · JPL
267942	2004 EA_{25}	—	March 15, 2004	Socorro	LINEAR	·	1.5 km	MPC · JPL
267943	2004 EG_{35}	—	March 12, 2004	Palomar	NEAT	·	1.9 km	MPC · JPL
267944	2004 ED_{42}	—	March 15, 2004	Catalina	CSS	·	1.4 km	MPC · JPL
267945	2004 EF_{44}	—	March 13, 2004	Palomar	NEAT	·	1.5 km	MPC · JPL
267946	2004 ER_{59}	—	March 15, 2004	Palomar	NEAT	·	5.1 km	MPC · JPL
267947	2004 EA_{68}	—	March 15, 2004	Socorro	LINEAR	ERI	1.9 km	MPC · JPL
267948	2004 ET_{73}	—	March 15, 2004	Catalina	CSS	V	1.1 km	MPC · JPL
267949	2004 EW_{76}	—	March 15, 2004	Catalina	CSS	·	3.5 km	MPC · JPL
267950	2004 ED_{80}	—	March 14, 2004	Socorro	LINEAR	·	1.4 km	MPC · JPL
267951	2004 EA_{84}	—	March 14, 2004	Kitt Peak	Spacewatch	MAS	790 m	MPC · JPL
267952	2004 ES_{85}	—	March 15, 2004	Socorro	LINEAR	·	1.6 km	MPC · JPL
267953	2004 ET_{85}	—	March 15, 2004	Socorro	LINEAR	V	950 m	MPC · JPL
267954	2004 EO_{105}	—	March 15, 2004	Kitt Peak	Spacewatch	·	1.1 km	MPC · JPL
267955	2004 FL_{20}	—	March 16, 2004	Catalina	CSS	·	1.5 km	MPC · JPL
267956	2004 FB_{21}	—	March 16, 2004	Catalina	CSS	·	1.7 km	MPC · JPL
267957	2004 FZ_{27}	—	March 17, 2004	Kitt Peak	Spacewatch	MAS	760 m	MPC · JPL
267958	2004 FK_{29}	—	March 24, 2004	Siding Spring	SSS	PHO	1.1 km	MPC · JPL
267959	2004 FK_{35}	—	March 16, 2004	Socorro	LINEAR	NYS	1.1 km	MPC · JPL
267960	2004 FX_{36}	—	March 16, 2004	Kitt Peak	Spacewatch	·	2.1 km	MPC · JPL
267961	2004 FD_{39}	—	March 17, 2004	Kitt Peak	Spacewatch	·	1.3 km	MPC · JPL
267962	2004 FN_{39}	—	March 17, 2004	Socorro	LINEAR	PHO	1.5 km	MPC · JPL
267963	2004 FG_{45}	—	March 16, 2004	Socorro	LINEAR	NYS	1.5 km	MPC · JPL
267964	2004 FK_{55}	—	March 19, 2004	Socorro	LINEAR	·	1.6 km	MPC · JPL
267965	2004 FL_{66}	—	March 20, 2004	Socorro	LINEAR	·	800 m	MPC · JPL
267966	2004 FZ_{72}	—	March 17, 2004	Kitt Peak	Spacewatch	·	1.0 km	MPC · JPL
267967	2004 FV_{86}	—	March 19, 2004	Palomar	NEAT	·	1.5 km	MPC · JPL
267968	2004 FR_{93}	—	March 22, 2004	Socorro	LINEAR	NYS	1.4 km	MPC · JPL
267969	2004 FG_{96}	—	March 23, 2004	Socorro	LINEAR	·	1.6 km	MPC · JPL
267970	2004 FL_{98}	—	March 23, 2004	Socorro	LINEAR	·	1.9 km	MPC · JPL
267971	2004 FL_{109}	—	March 24, 2004	Anderson Mesa	LONEOS	·	1.1 km	MPC · JPL
267972	2004 FX_{109}	—	March 24, 2004	Anderson Mesa	LONEOS	·	1.1 km	MPC · JPL
267973	2004 FO_{115}	—	March 23, 2004	Socorro	LINEAR	·	1.1 km	MPC · JPL
267974	2004 FU_{115}	—	March 23, 2004	Socorro	LINEAR	·	1.7 km	MPC · JPL
267975	2004 FY_{123}	—	March 26, 2004	Kitt Peak	Spacewatch	MAS	930 m	MPC · JPL
267976	2004 FT_{125}	—	March 27, 2004	Socorro	LINEAR	NYS	1.1 km	MPC · JPL
267977	2004 FY_{145}	—	March 30, 2004	Junk Bond	Junk Bond	·	1.6 km	MPC · JPL
267978	2004 FV_{162}	—	March 16, 2004	Valmeca	C. Demeautis, Matter, D.	PHO	840 m	MPC · JPL
267979	2004 GL_{3}	—	April 9, 2004	Siding Spring	SSS	·	1.9 km	MPC · JPL
267980	2004 GX_{3}	—	April 11, 2004	Palomar	NEAT	·	1.4 km	MPC · JPL
267981	2004 GF_{4}	—	April 11, 2004	Palomar	NEAT	·	1.3 km	MPC · JPL
267982	2004 GB_{13}	—	April 11, 2004	Palomar	NEAT	·	1.7 km	MPC · JPL
267983	2004 GC_{20}	—	April 15, 2004	Desert Eagle	W. K. Y. Yeung	NYS	1.4 km	MPC · JPL
267984	2004 GM_{20}	—	April 9, 2004	Siding Spring	SSS	·	1.5 km	MPC · JPL
267985	2004 GA_{26}	—	April 14, 2004	Kitt Peak	Spacewatch	·	1.0 km	MPC · JPL
267986	2004 GU_{53}	—	April 13, 2004	Kitt Peak	Spacewatch	·	1.1 km	MPC · JPL
267987	2004 GU_{56}	—	April 13, 2004	Kitt Peak	Spacewatch	NYS	1.1 km	MPC · JPL
267988	2004 GU_{58}	—	April 15, 2004	Anderson Mesa	LONEOS	·	1.5 km	MPC · JPL
267989	2004 GX_{60}	—	April 15, 2004	Anderson Mesa	LONEOS	·	1.1 km	MPC · JPL
267990	2004 GG_{64}	—	April 13, 2004	Kitt Peak	Spacewatch	V	850 m	MPC · JPL
267991	2004 GC_{73}	—	April 15, 2004	Palomar	NEAT	·	1.1 km	MPC · JPL
267992	2004 GS_{78}	—	April 11, 2004	Palomar	NEAT	MAS	930 m	MPC · JPL
267993	2004 GF_{82}	—	April 13, 2004	Palomar	NEAT	MAS	770 m	MPC · JPL
267994	2004 HL_{12}	—	April 19, 2004	Socorro	LINEAR	·	1.5 km	MPC · JPL
267995	2004 HE_{25}	—	April 19, 2004	Socorro	LINEAR	·	1.4 km	MPC · JPL
267996	2004 HQ_{27}	—	April 20, 2004	Socorro	LINEAR	·	1.5 km	MPC · JPL
267997	2004 HH_{28}	—	April 20, 2004	Socorro	LINEAR	·	1.3 km	MPC · JPL
267998	2004 HV_{42}	—	April 20, 2004	Socorro	LINEAR	·	1.6 km	MPC · JPL
267999	2004 HR_{72}	—	April 28, 2004	Kitt Peak	Spacewatch	·	1.1 km	MPC · JPL
268000	2004 JN_{6}	—	May 9, 2004	Palomar	NEAT	·	1.1 km	MPC · JPL

back to top

== See also ==
- Meanings of minor-planet names: 267001–268000
