= Xi'an Railway Hub =

Railway line in Shaanxi, China

Xi'an Railway Hub 西安铁路枢纽

Overview
- Status: Operational
- Locale: Xi'an, Shaanxi, China

Service
- Type: Heavy rail
- Operator: CR Xi'an

Technical
- Track gauge: 1,435 mm (4 ft 8 1/2 in)
- Electrification: 25 kV 50 Hz AC (Overhead line)
- Signalling: ABS

Xi'an Railway Hub (Chinese: 西安铁路枢纽) is the largest railway hub in Northwestern China and one of the nationally planned comprehensive railway hubs.

== Hub limits ==
The limits of the hub are Zhongjiacun railway station on the Baotou–Xi'an railway to the north, Weinan railway station on the Longhai railway to the east, Yinzhen railway station on the Xi'an–Ankang railway to the south, and Xingping railway station on the Longhai Railway to the west.

== Main stations ==
The four main and one auxiliary passenger stations are Xi'an, Xi'an North, Xi'an East, Xi'an South, and Xi'an West. The two other major stations within the hub are Xinfengzhen, a network marshalling station, and Xi'an Guojigang, a first-class logistics base.

== Railway lines ==
=== Conventional ===
- Longhai railway: Lanzhou – Xi'an – Lianyungang, double-track electrification.
- Xi'an Railway Hub North Loop line: Xinfengzhen – Maoling, diverts freight trains within the hub, double-track electrification.
- Nanjing–Xi'an railway: Nanjing – Xi'an, double-track electrification.
- Xi'an–Ankang railway: Xi'an – Ankang, double-track electrification.
- Baotou–Xi'an railway: Baotou – Xi'an, double-track electrification.
- Xi'an–Pingliang railway: Xi'an – Pingliang, single-track electrification.
- Xianyang–Tongchuan railway: Xianyang – Tongchuan, single-track electrification, and double-track electrification in the section sharing the same line with the Xi'an Railway Hub North Loop line.
- Houma–Xi'an railway: Houma – Yanliang, some sections have double-track electrification.
- Xi'an–Huyi railway: Xi'an – Yuxia (in Huyi district), single-track non-electrified.

=== High-speed ===
- Xuzhou–Lanzhou HSR: Xuzhou – Xi'an – Lanzhou, double-track electrified, passenger-only line, designed speed 350 km/h (220 mph).
- Xi'an–Chengdu HSR: Xi'an – Chengdu, double-track electrified passenger line, designed speed 250 km/h (160 mph).
- Datong–Xi'an HSR: Datong – Xi'an, double-track electrified, passenger dedicated line, design speed 250 km/h (160 mph), Taiyuan–Datong section is under construction.
- Yinchuan–Xi'an HSR: Yinchuan – Xi'an, double-track electrified, passenger dedicated line, design speed 250 km/h (160 mph), part of the Baotou (Yinchuan)–Hainan corridor, part of China's "Eight Vertical and Eight Horizontal" network.

=== Under construction ===
- Xi'an–Yan'an HSR: Xi'an – Yan'an, a double-track electrified passenger dedicated line with a design speed of 350 km/h (220 mph), part of the Baotou (Yinchuan)–Hainan corridor, part of China's "Eight Vertical and Eight Horizontal" network.
- Xi'an–Chongqing HSR: Xi'an – Chongqing, a double-track electrified passenger dedicated line with a design speed of 350 km/h (220 mph), is part of the Baotou (Yinchuan)–Hainan corridor, part of the "Eight Vertical and Eight Horizontal" network.
- Xi'an–Shiyan HSR: Xi'an – Wuhan, double-track electrified passenger dedicated line, with a designed speed of 350 km/h (220 mph).

=== Planned ===
- Guanzhong Intercity Railway
- Xi'an-Baoji Intercity Railway: Xi'an – Baoji.
