= Xinfengzhen railway station =

Railway station in Xi'an, China

Xinfengzhen 新丰镇
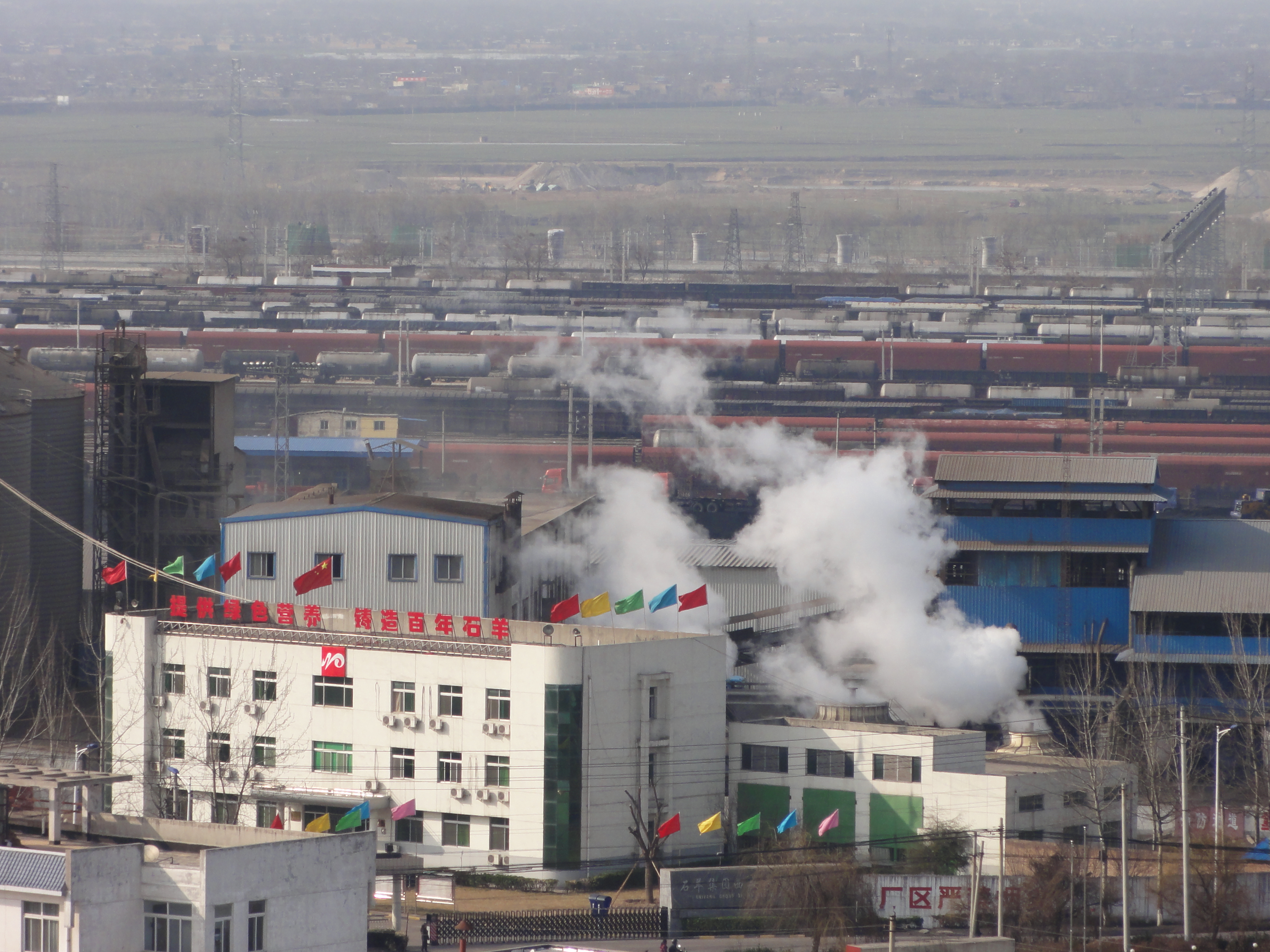

General information
- Location: Lintong District, Xi'an, Shaanxi; China
- Coordinates: 34°25′35″N 109°15′08″E
- Operated by: CR Xi'an
- Line(s): Baotou–Xi'an railway; Longhai railway; Nanjing–Xi'an railway; Xi'an–Ankang railway; Xi'an Railway Hub

Other information
- Station code: 39404 (TMIS code); XFY (telegraph code); XFZ (Pinyin code)
- Classification: Top Class station (特等站)

History
- Opened: 1934; September 2008 (reconstructed as a marshalling yard)

Xinfengzhen railway station (Chinese: 新丰镇站) is a station in Lintong District, Xi'an, Shaanxi. The station is the main marshalling yard for Xi'an railway hub and the largest marshalling yard in western China.

== History ==
The station was established in 1934. It was reconstructed as a marshalling yard in 2008.
