= Xi'an Guojigang railway station =

Railway Station in Xi'an, China

Xi'an Guojigang Railway Station 西安国际港站
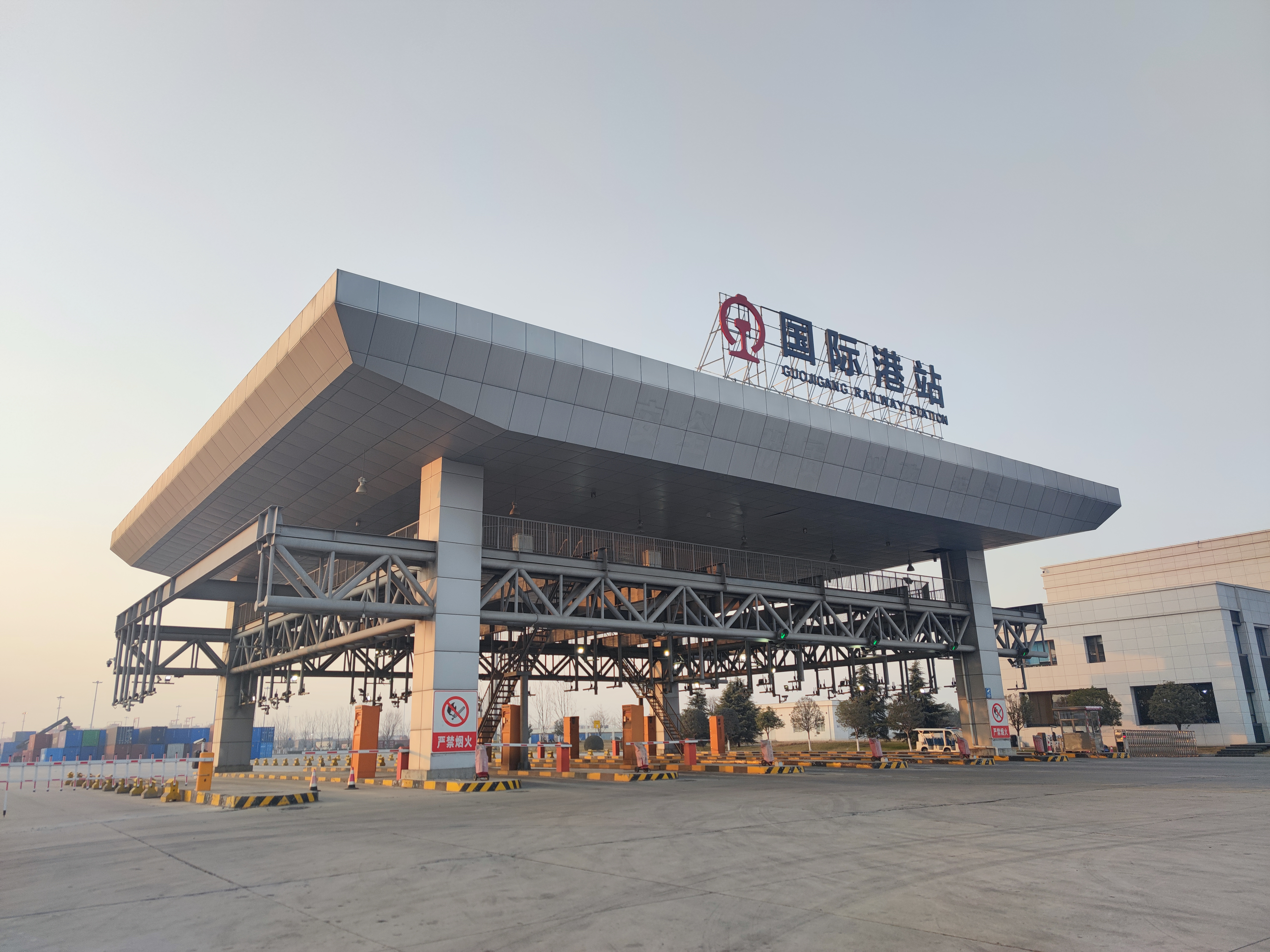
- Xi'an Guojigang station, in front of the Central Container Center

General information
- Other names: Xinzhu station (former name)
- Location: Baqiao District, Xi'an, Shaanxi; China
- Coordinates: 34.4129°N 109.0604°E
- Operator: CR Xi'an
- Line: Xi'an Railway Hub

Construction
- Structure type: Elevated

Other information
- Station code: 38450 (TMIS code); EZY (telegraph code); XAG (Pinyin code)

Services
Preceding station	China Railway	Following station
Xiaojiacun towards Lianyungang East	Longhai railway	Xinfengzhen towards Lanzhou
Location
- Location within China

Xi'an Railway Port of Entry (西安铁路口岸)
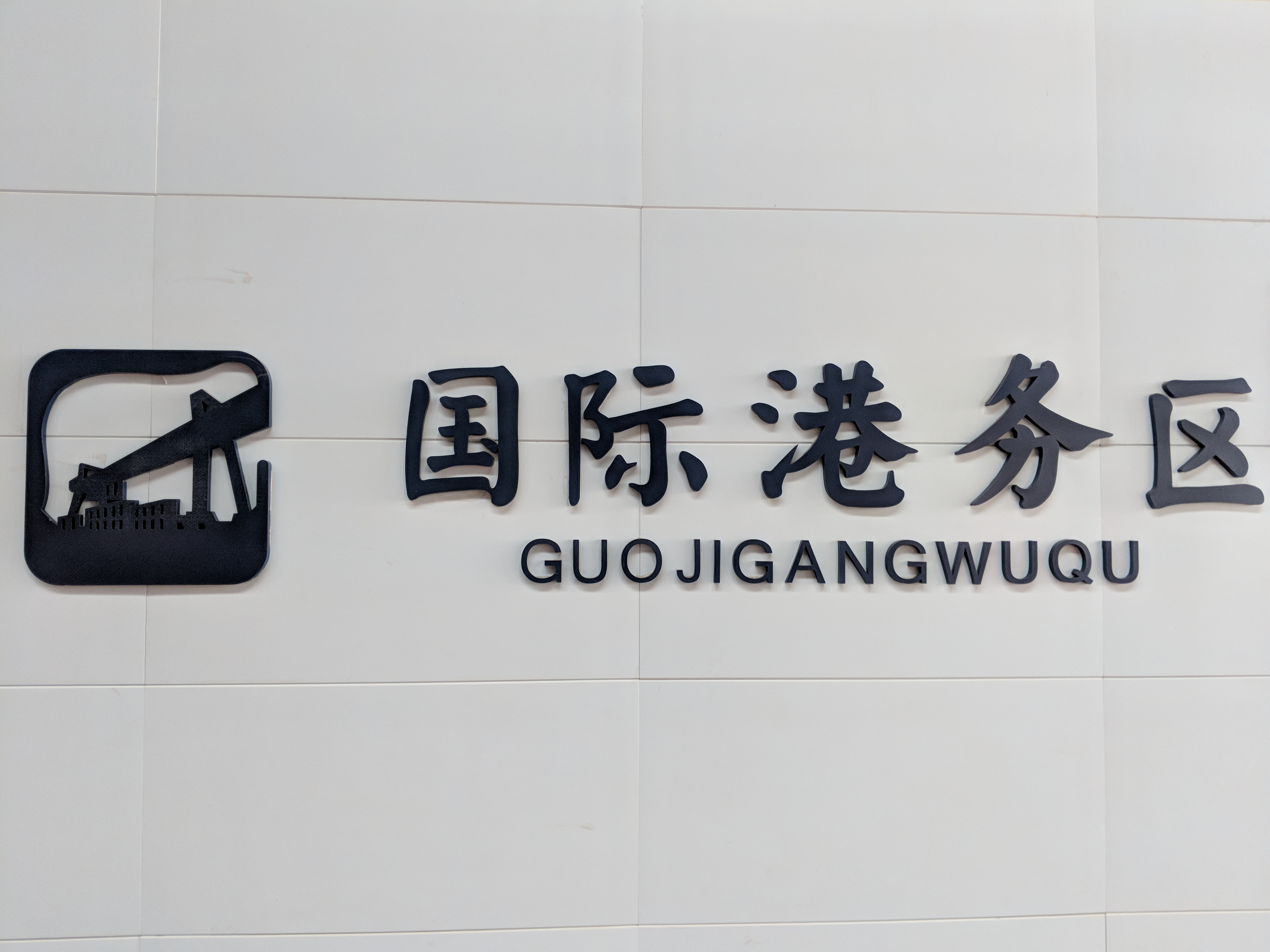
- Sign of the Guojigang Wuqu metro station

Location
- Country: China
- Location: Baqiao District, Xi'an, Shaanxi

Details
- Opened: 12 December 2019; 28 October 2014 (Temporary status)

The Xi'an Guojigang Station (literally "Xi'an International Port Station") is a first class railway freight station located on the North Ring Line of the Xi'an Railway Hub, serving the Xi'an International Port Service Area. It is an important part of the Xi'an Inland Port. It is composed of the Xi'an Railway Container Center Station, the Xinzhu Railway Comprehensive Logistics Center, the Kazakhstan Xi'an Terminal, and other facilities. It mainly handles cargo loading and unloading of loaded trucks, direct packages, and containers. The station (then named Xinzhu station) was built in 2006 and soon became the terminal of the Trans-Eurasian Logistics international freight trains between Xi'an and European destinations since 2013.

== Sub-stations ==
=== Xi'an Railway Container Center Station ===
The Container Center (西安铁路集装箱中心站) is one of the 18 railway container central stations planned by the former Ministry of Railways of the PRC, built with a total investment of about RMB 636 million. It is located in the South Yard of the station, covering an area of 2,058 mu, 137.2 hectares (339 acres), operated by the China United International Rail Containers Co., Ltd.It consists of four parts: container operation area, express operation area, special cargo loading operation area, and truckload shipping operation area.

=== Comprehensive Logistics Center ===
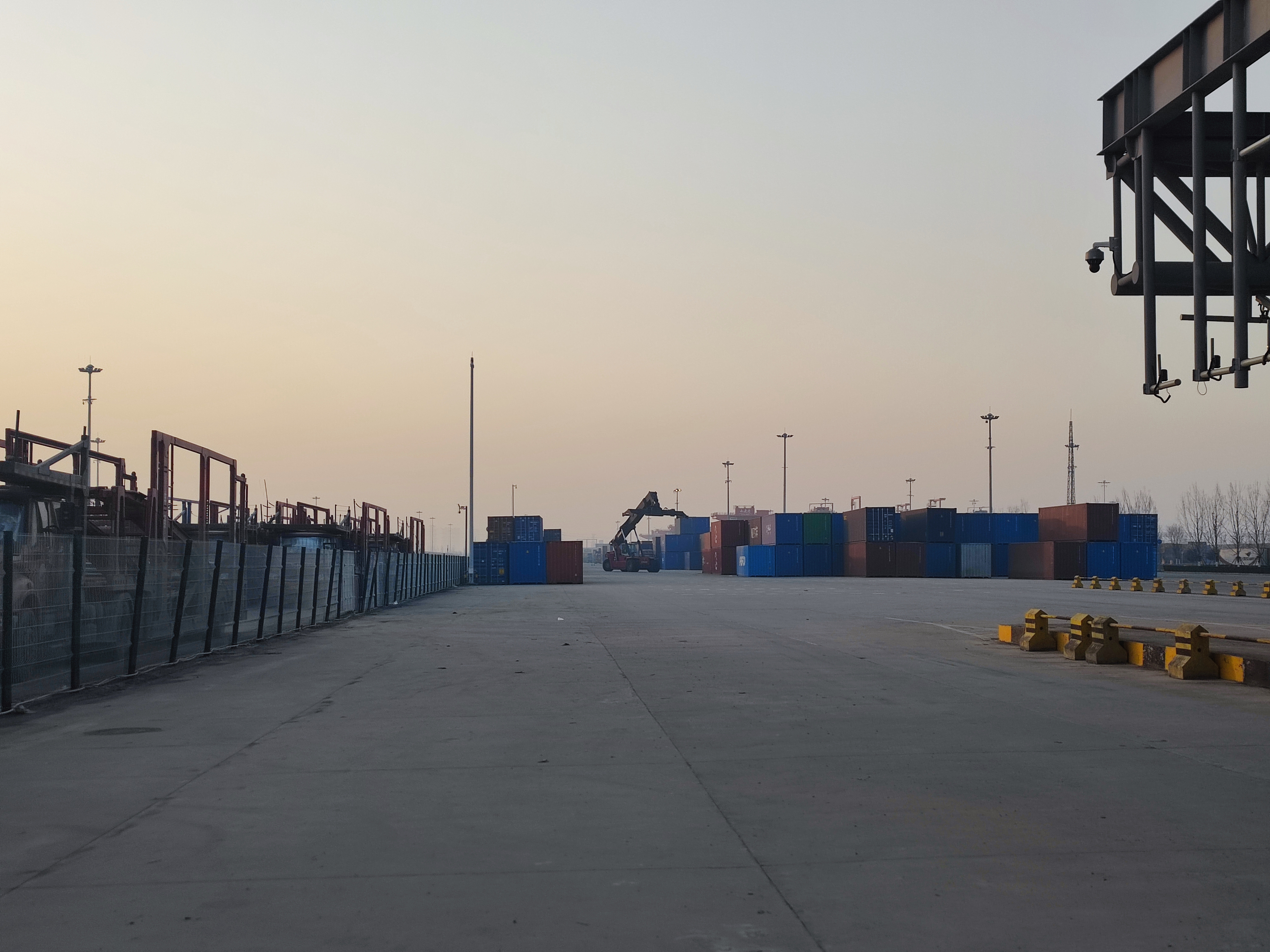
Xi'an Guojigang container yard

The Xinzhu Railway Comprehensive Logistics Center (新筑铁路综合物流中心) is located in the North Yard of the station, and it is one of the 35 first-class railway logistics bases (铁路一级物流基地) in the country, covering an area of 2,441 mu (162.7 hectares (402 acres)). It consists of eight functional areas:

1. long, large and bulky cargo (长大笨重)
2. truckload transshipment (整车中转)
3. packed freight (成件包装)
4. road/rail transshipment (公铁联运)
5. highway collection and distribution (公路集散)
6. cold chain (冷链鲜活)
7. international cargo (国际货物)
8. comprehensive office (综合办公)

Construction started in 2014 and it was put into service in 2018 The new site was fully opened in September 2018.

=== Kazakhstan Xi'an Terminal ===
The KXT (哈萨克斯坦西安码头) was built jointly by China and the government of Kazakhstan to expedite the distribution of goods imported and exported between the two countries. The terminal has cargo warehouses, container stacking areas, and other operating areas. It is connected to the container loading and unloading area of Xi'an Guojigang station for fast transfer. China Railway Xi'an Group

=== Port of Entry ===
The status of port of entry, allowing direct international trade, was established temporarily in 2014 and permanently in 2018. It is under the jurisdiction of the Xi'an Railway Station Customs Office, subordinate to the Xi'an Customs Administration. It manages the China United International Rail Container's Xi'an Custom Supervision Area, and the Xi'an Railway Port's Vehicles and Truckloads Supervision Operations Area.

=== Expansion and rebuilding ===
In order to further improve the station's cargo handling capacity, China Railway Xi'an Group has expanded the station three times, increasing the number of cargo tracks to 29, of which 12 tracks have both arrival and departure functions. After the renovation, the rail lines in the station are arranged in a through-and-around manner, and trains can be loaded and unloaded straight in-straight out.

== Trans-Eurasia Logistics' "Chang'an Express" ==
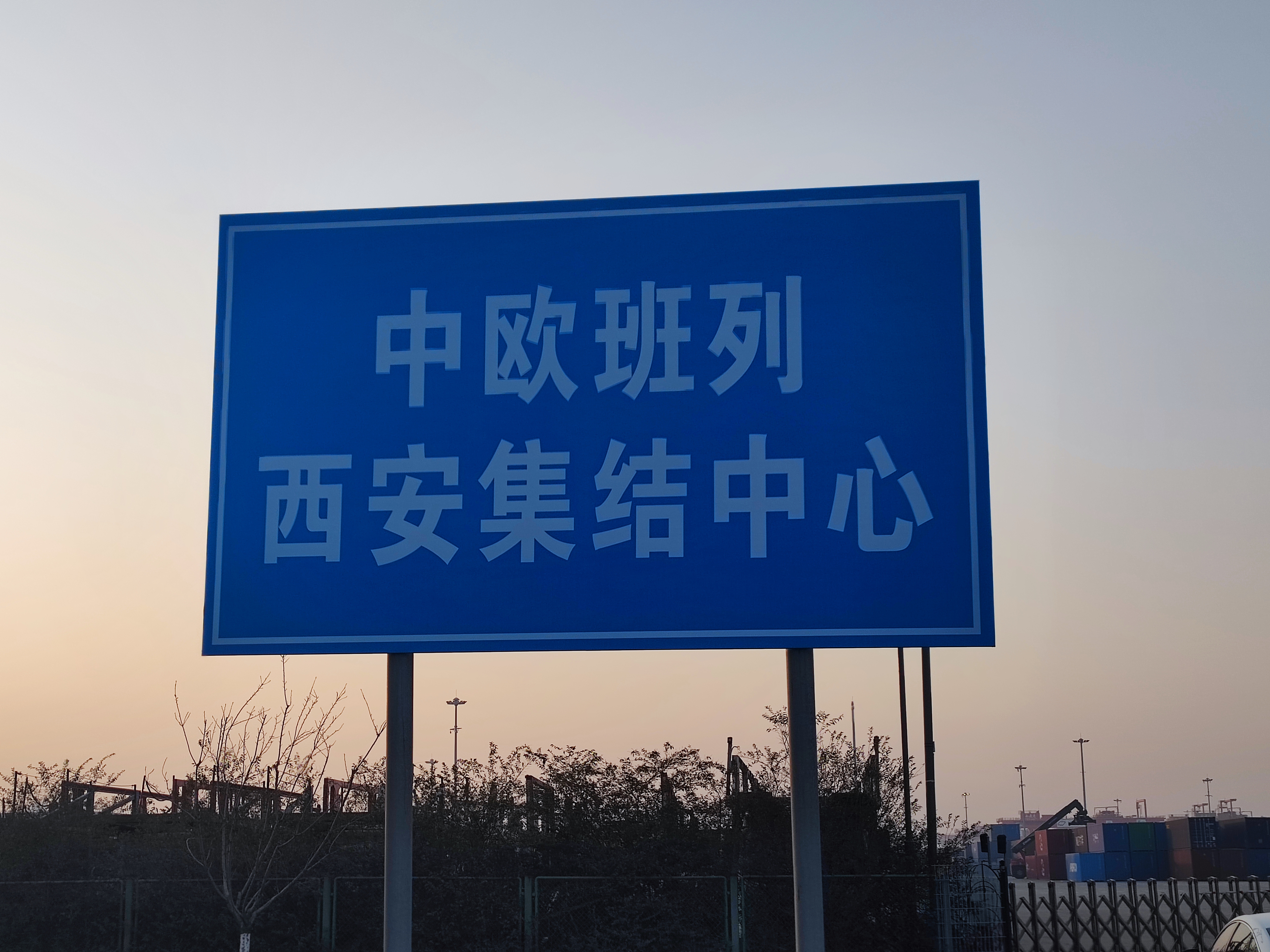
Sign of the Trans-Eurasian Logistics' container center

In October 2013, the first Trans-Eurasian train from Xi'an departed from this station. Subsequently, the number and destinations of the Trans-Eurasian trains from Xi'an (informally called the "Chang'an Express") increased year by year. In October 2022, the station launched the first fully scheduled Trans-Eurasian Logistics' train. The train has strictly fixed arrival and departure times in countries along the route, shortening the freight transportation time and simplifying the logistics calculations. From 2024, regular intermodal transport operations started. As of October 2023, Xi'an Guojigang Station has operated more than 20,000 trains, accounting for about a quarter of the total number of Sino-European through-trains in China, becoming the station with the largest number of trans-continental trains in China.

== History ==
- In 2006, Xinzhu station started operation.
- On 1 July 2010, the Xi'an Railway Container Center entered operation.
- On 28 November 2013, the first Trans-Eurasian Logistics' train departed the station.
- On 28 October 2014, the National Ports of Entry Management Office authorized the station as a temporary port of entry.
- On 27 October 2016, the Xi'an Xinzhu Railway Comprehensive Logistics Center started construction.
- On September 27, 2018, the Xinzhu Logistics Base arrival and departure yard was opened, greatly expanding the station's capacity.
- On December 11, 2019, Xi'an Railway Station Customs Office was put into operation and took over the customs duties for the Xi'an Railway Port of Entry and the Xi'an Comprehensive Bonded Zone at this station.
- On 1 April 2021, Xinzhu Station was renamed Xi'an Guojigang Station.
- On October 26, 2022, the first Trans-Eurasia freight train that ran entirely on a scheduled timetable departed from this station.
- On 28 February 2024, the Xi'an Kazakhstan Terminal was put into operation.
- On 7 March 2024, the first Trans-Eurasian Express (Hanoi -- Xi'an -- Budapest) cross-border intermodal road/rail freight train departed from Xi'an Guojigang Station, and this cross-border freight service began regular operation.

== See also ==
- Ports of Entry of China
