= Ganjing railway station =

Railway station in Shaanxi, China

Ganjing railway station 甘井站
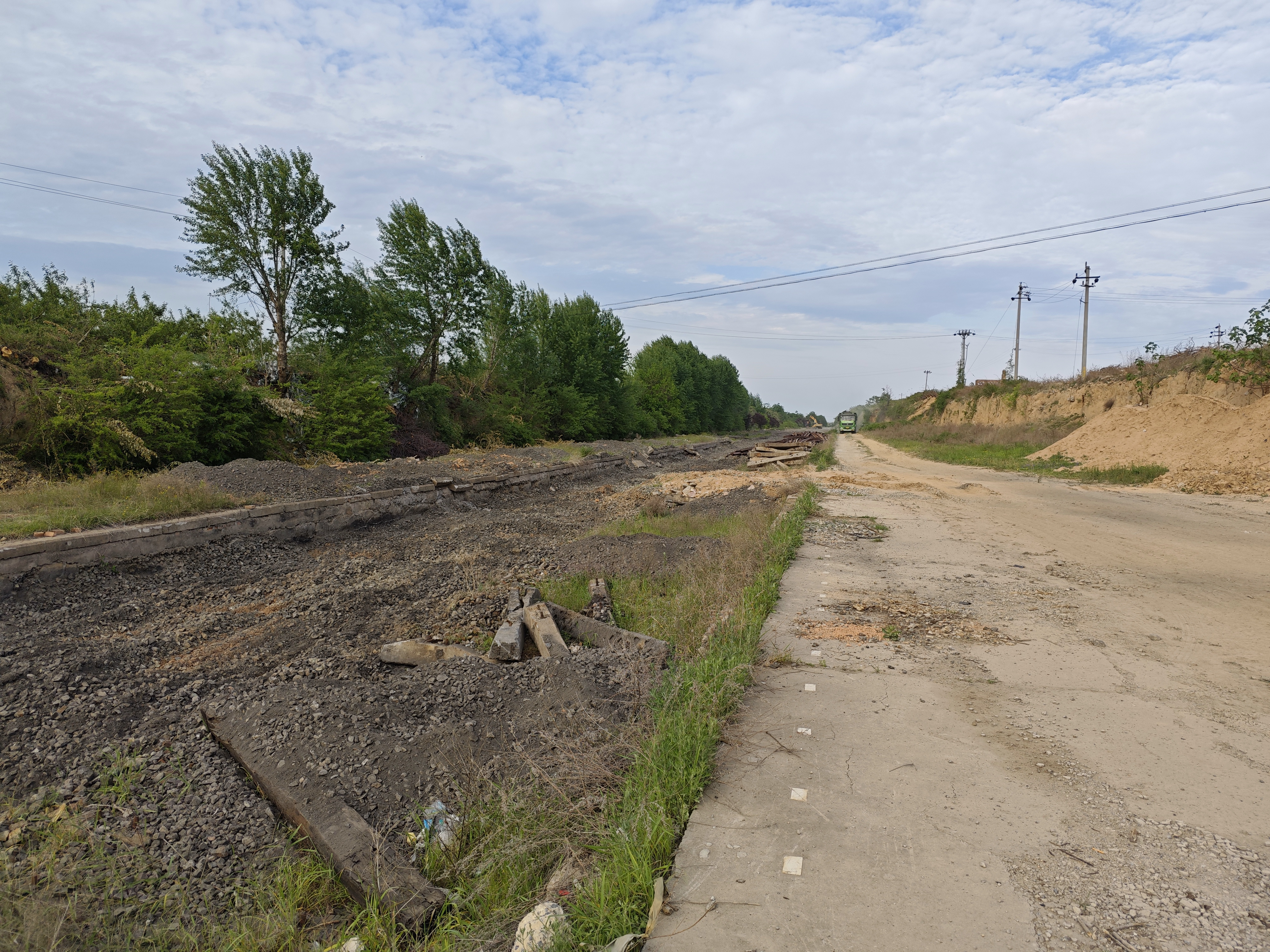
- The station after the Huangling-Hancheng-Houma railway was completed

General information
- Location: Heyang County, Weinan, Shaanxi; China
- Coordinates: 35.324708°N 110.117142°E
- Operated by: CR Xi'an
- Line: Houma–Xi'an railway

Other information
- Station code: GJY (Telegraph); GJI (Pinyin); 28892 (Station)

History
- Opened: 1971
Location

Ganjing station (Chinese: 甘井站) is a railway station in Heyang County, Weinan, Shaanxi, China, operated by CR Xi'an. It opened its services in 1971.

The station saw less traffic after the Huangling-Hancheng-Houma railway was completed. It handled passengers and freight.
