= Huazhou railway station =

Railway station in Shaanxi, China

Huazhou railway station 华州站
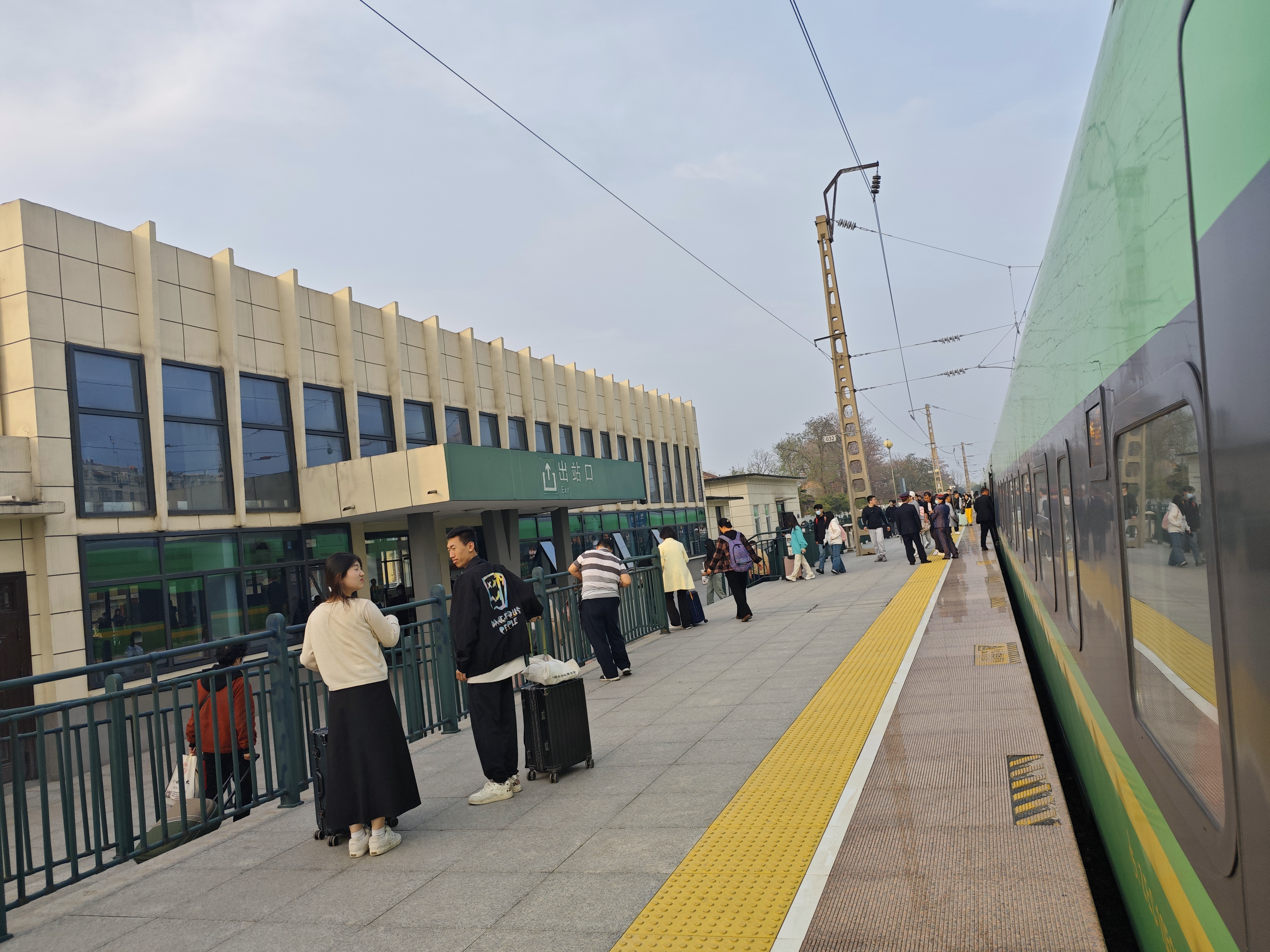
- The station platform in 2024

General information
- Location: Xinglin Town, Huazhou District, Weinan, Shaanxi; China
- Coordinates: 34.4968°N 109.7575°E
- Operator: CR Xi'an
- Line: Longhai railway

Other information
- Station code: HXY (Telegraph); HZH (Pinyin); 39374 (Station)

History
- Opened: 1958

Services
Preceding station	China Railway	Following station
Lianhuasi towards Lianyungang East	Longhai railway	Shuyuan towards Lanzhou
Location

Huazhou railway station (Chinese: 华州站) is a railway station in Xinglin Town, Huazhou District, Weinan, Shaanxi, China, operated by CR Xi'an. It opened its services in 1958.

The station handles passenger services on the Longhai railway. On 1 January 2026, it was the first destination of Shaanxi's 2026 snow and ice tour.
