= Xi'an South railway station =

Railway station in Xi'an, China

Xi'an South railway station (Chinese: 西安南站) is a new railway station planned as part of the Xi'an Railway Hub in Cepocun, Chang'an District, Xi'an, Shaanxi, China. The previous Xi'an South station has been renamed Yinzhen railway station, its name before 2006.

It is one of the central hub stations of the Xi'an–Chongqing high speed railway, Xi'an–Wuhan high speed railway, Xi'an–Chengdu high-speed railway, Xi'an–Ankang high-speed railway, Xichang high-speed railway and Guanzhong Intercity Railway. In the future, it will become a large-scale passenger transportation hub with eight north-south and eight east-west routes. The station is expected to connect to Xi'an Metro line 6, line 12, line 16 and line 23. According to China's railway development plan, Xi'an railway station, Xi'an North railway station, the new Xi'an South railway station and Xi'an East railway station will become the four central stations for Xi'an railway passenger transportation in the future.

Among them, Xi’an South Station of Metro Line 6 was opened on 26 September 2024.
