= 西鐵 =

西铁, 西鉄 or 西鐵 may refer to:

- China Railway Xi'an Group (中国铁路西安局集团), abbreviated as CR Xi'an (西铁)
- Nishi-Nippon Railroad (西日本鉄道), also known as Nishitetsu (西鉄)
- West Rail line (西鐵綫), previously known as KCR West Rail (九廣西鐵)
