= Yinzhen railway station =

Railway station in Xi'an, Shaanxi

Yinzhen 引镇
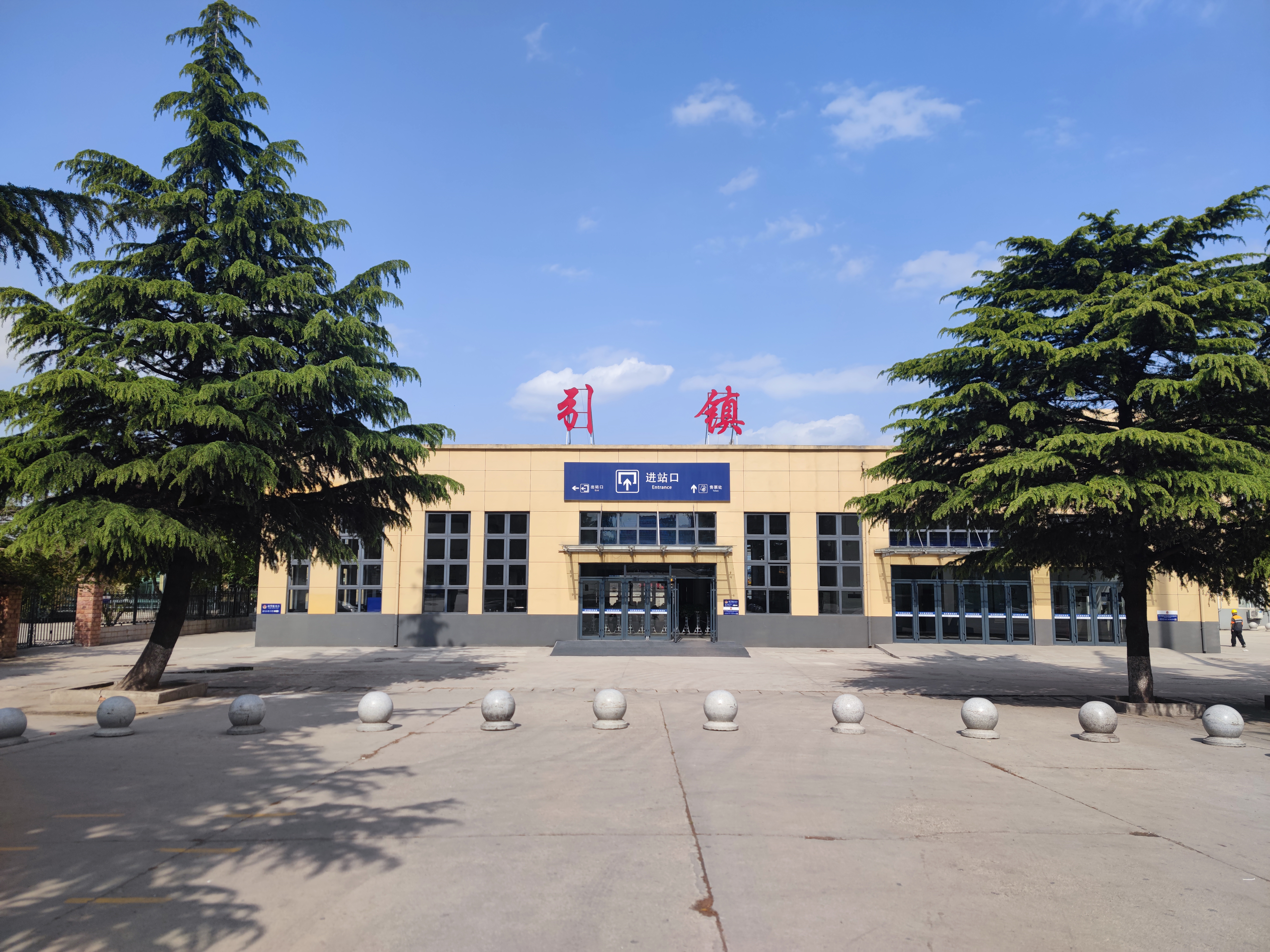
- Exterior of the station in 2023

General information
- Location: Yinzhen Subdistrict, Chang'an District, Xi'an, Shaanxi; China
- Coordinates: 34.0941°N 109.0968°E
- Line(s): Xi'an–Ankang railway

Yinzhen railway station (Chinese: 引镇站) is a railway station in Yinzhen Subdistrict, Chang'an District, Xi'an, Shaanxi, China.

It is on the north–south Xi'an–Ankang railway. This is an intermediate stop for some services coming from the south that continue north or east, avoiding central Xi'an. Other services continue to Xi'an railway station instead of, or in addition to, stopping here.

== Name ==
On 1 July 2006, the station was renamed from Chang'an railway station to Xi'an South railway station.

On 28 February 2023, the station was renamed from Xi'an South railway station to Yinzhen railway station, to make way for the new Xi'an South railway station.

== Station layout ==
The station itself is rather small, with only a one-storey terminal building and a front square. The ticket office is located on the east side of the station.

== See also ==
- Xi'an South railway station (HSR), a planned high-speed rail station in Cepo, Chang'an District, Xi'an. The HSR station will be served by Line 6 of Xi'an Metro.
