= Nanjing–Xi'an railway =

Railway line in China

Nanjing–Xi'an railway 宁西铁路
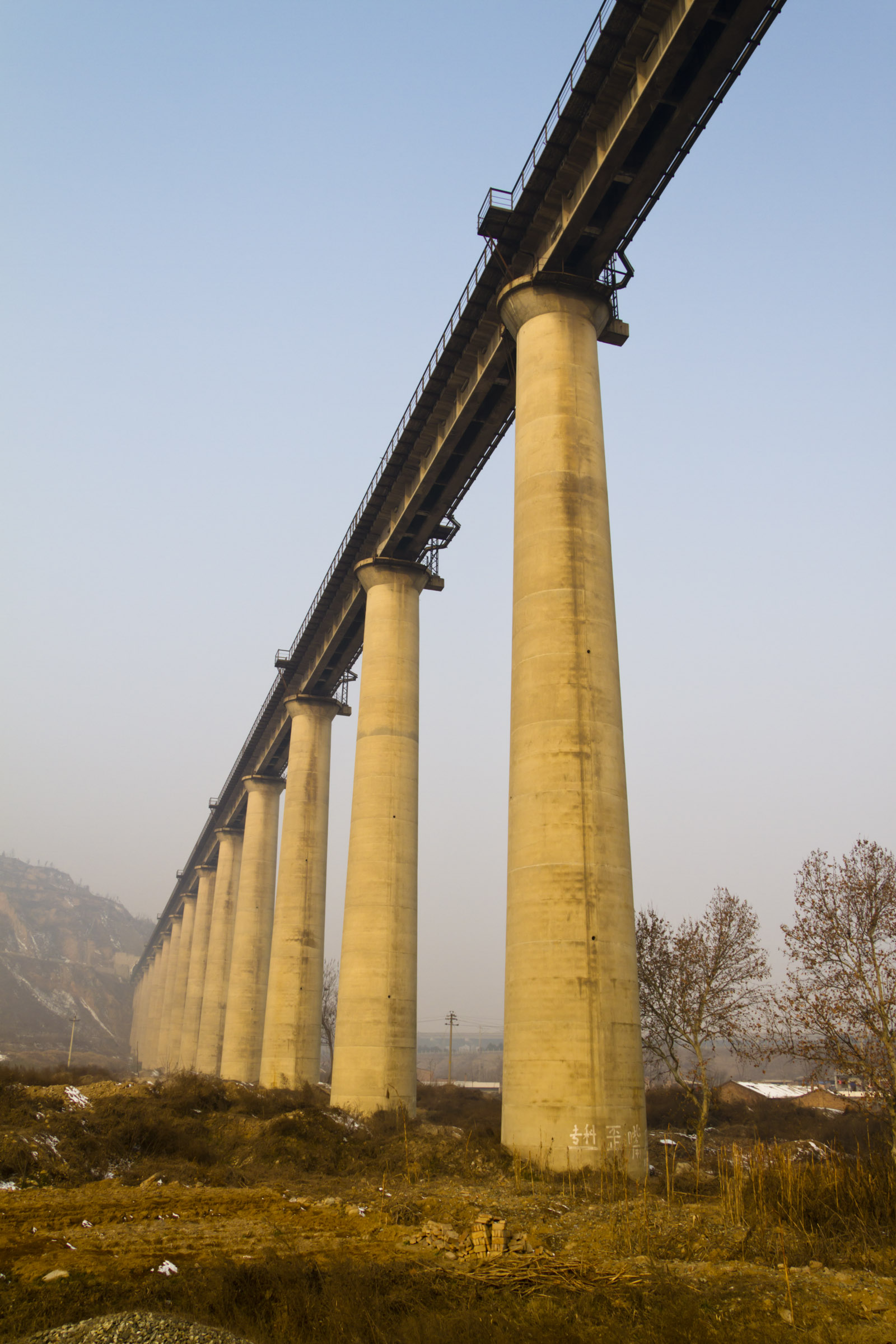
- The Nanjing–Xi'an railway over the You River near Weinan in Shaanxi Province

Overview
- Other name: Ningxi railway
- Status: Operational
- Locale: China: Shaanxi; Henan; Anhui; Jiangsu
- Termini: Nanjing; Xi'an

Service
- Type: Heavy rail
- System: China Railway
- Operator(s): China Railway Shanghai Group; China Railway Wuhan Group; China Railway Zhengzhou Group; China Railway Xi'an Group

Technical
- Line length: 1,076 km (669 mi)
- Track gauge: 1,435 mm (4 ft 8 1/2 in)

The Nanjing–Xi'an railway or Ningxi railway (simplified Chinese: 宁西铁路; traditional Chinese: 寧西鐵路; pinyin: níngxī tiělù), is a major trunkline railroad in China connecting Nanjing, the capital of Jiangsu Province and Xi'an, the capital of Shaanxi Province. The Chinese name for the line, Ningxi, is named after the two terminal cities, Ning, the Chinese character shorthand for the city of Nanjing, and Xi for Xian. The line is 1,196 km (743 mi) in length and comprises the Xi’an-Hefei section in the west, 1,196 km (743 mi) in length, that opened on January 7, 2004. And the high-speed Hefei–Nanjing section in the east, better known as the Hefei–Nanjing passenger railway, 166 km (103 mi) in length opened on April 18, 2008. In addition, a connection line 72 km (45 mi) in length was built in 2004 connected the main line in Sui County and the Hankou–Danjiangkou railway in northern Hubei. The Ningxi railway passes through five provinces in central and eastern China. Major cities along route include Nanjing and Pukou in Jiangsu Province; Feidong, Hefei and Lu'an in Anhui Province; Huangchuan, Xinyang, Nanyang and Xixia County in Henan Province and Shangluo, Weinan and Xian in Shaanxi Province. The main line skirts Hubei Province near Sui County.

Since the completion of Shanghai-Wuhan-Chengdu Corridor, of which Hefei-Nanjing section of this line is a part, the remaining part of this line is often called "Hefei-Xi'an Railway".

== History ==
Planning of the Nanjing-Xian railway began in early 1990s to bring railway service to a 400–500 km void in China's railway network between the Longhai railway to the north and Xiangyu and Handan railways to the south. Construction began in 2000 and the Xi'an-Hefei section of the line entered into operation on January 7, 2004. The high-speed, double-track Hefei-Nanjing section, also known as the Hefei–Nanjing railway, which was built from 2005 to 2008, opened on April 18, 2008 and forms part of the Shanghai–Wuhan–Chengdu passenger railway.

The construction of the second track of the Xi'an-Hefei section officially started in December 2012. The Shaanxi section opened on December 11, 2015, the Hubei section opened on December 15, 2015, and the Henan section and Anhui section opened on December 21, 2015.

The newly constructed double track uses continuously-welded track.

The line has been partly electrified. Electrification was completed between Nanjing and Yeji on 8 December 2015.

== Railway junctions ==
The Ningxi railway is a major trunkline in China's railway network and connects with numerous other railway lines including:

Jiangsu Province

- Nanjing: Beijing–Shanghai railway, Nanjing–Tongling railway, Nanjing–Qidong railway, Shanghai–Nanjing intercity railway

Anhui Province

- Hefei: Hefei–Wuhan railway, Huainan railway

Henan Province

- Huangchuan: Beijing–Kowloon railway
- Xinyang: Beijing–Guangzhou railway

Hubei Province

- Sui County: Xiaolin–Lishan railway

Henan Province

- Nanyang: Jiaozuo–Liuzhou railway

Shaanxi Province

- Xi'an: Longhai railway, Xi'an–Ankang railway, Houma–Xi'an railway

== See also ==
- List of railways in China
