= Xianyang railway station =

Railway station in Xianyang, China

Xianyang 咸阳
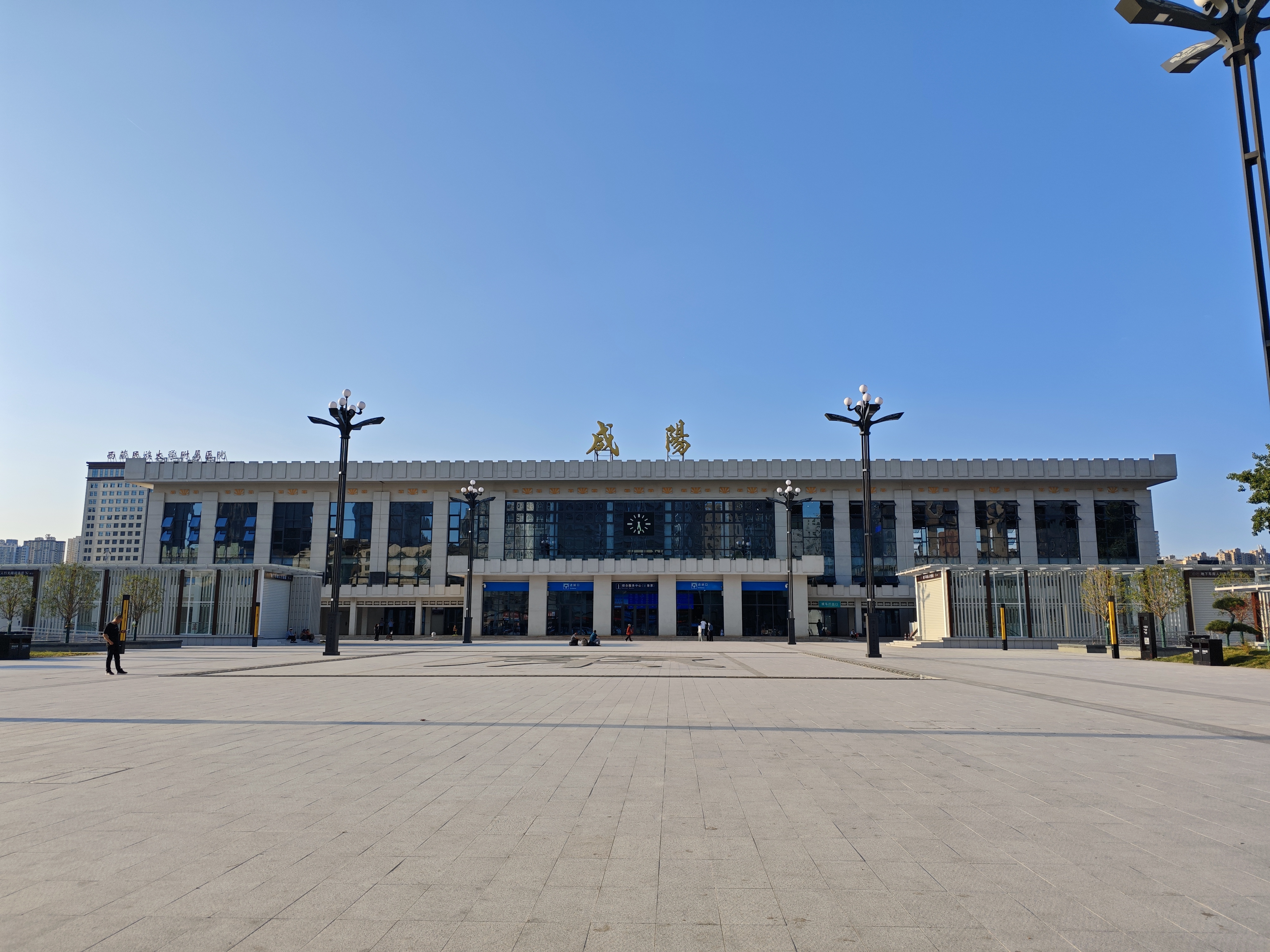

General information
- Location: Weicheng District, Xianyang, Shaanxi; China
- Coordinates: 34°20′41″N 108°43′48″E
- Operator: CR Xi'an
- Lines: Longhai railway; Xianyang–Tongchuan railway
- Platforms: 3 (1 side platform and 1 island platform)
- Connections: Bus terminal

Other information
- Station code: 39500 (TMIS code); XYY (telegraph code); XYA (Pinyin code)
- Classification: Class 2 station (二等站)

History
- Opened: 1936

Services
Preceding station	China Railway	Following station
Xi'an towards Lianyungang East	Longhai railway	Xingping towards Lanzhou
Location
- Location within China

Xianyang railway station (simplified Chinese: 咸阳站; traditional Chinese: 咸陽站; pinyin: Xiányáng Zhàn) is a station on Longhai railway in Weicheng District, Xianyang, Shaanxi.

== History ==
The station was opened in 1936.

In 1991, the current station building was put into use.

== See also ==
- Xianyang Qindu railway station
