= Xi'an West railway station =

Railway station in Xi'an, Shaanxi

Xi'an West 西安西
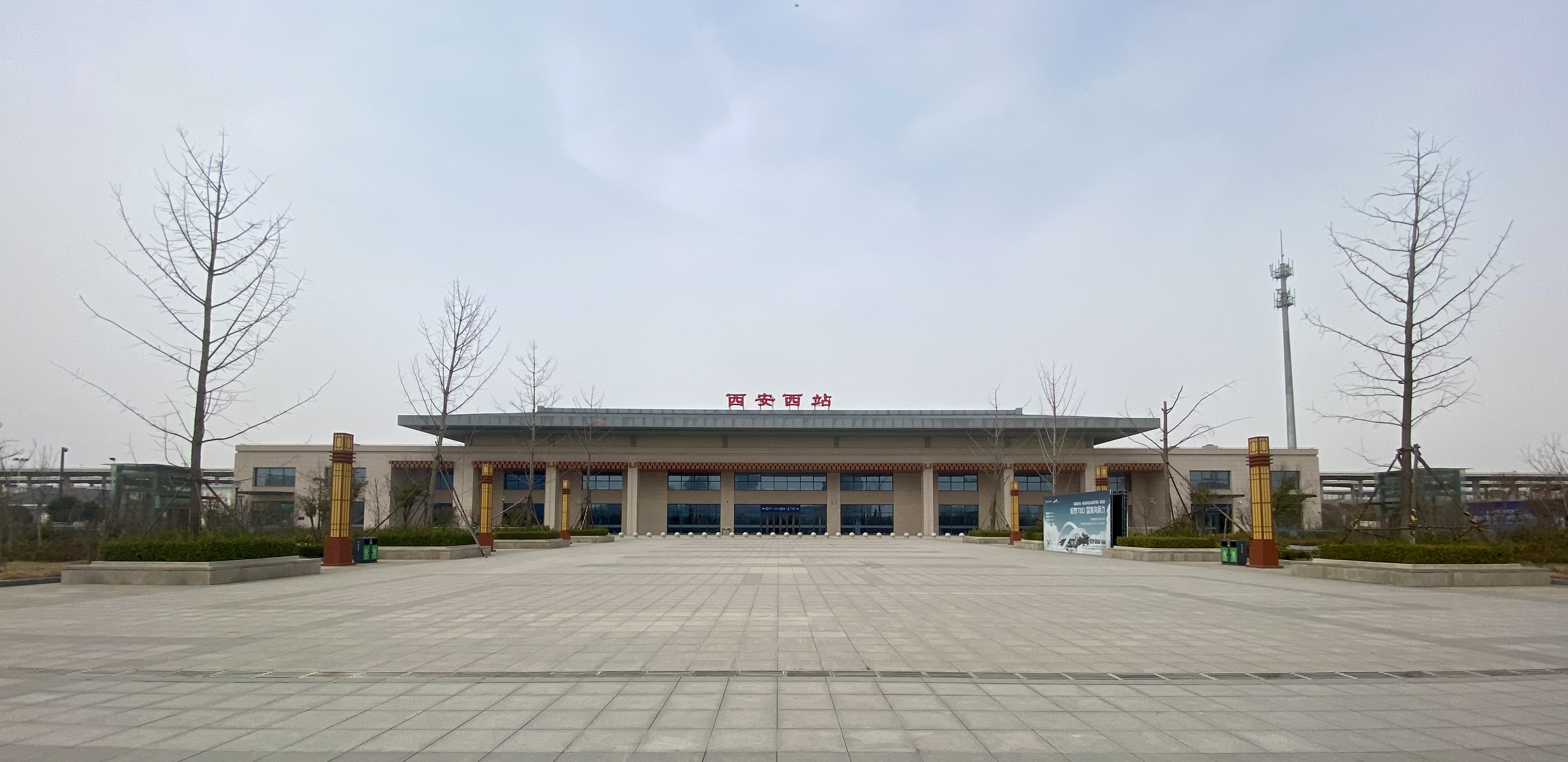
- Xi'an West Railway Station in 2023

General information
- Location: Wangsi Subdistrict, Chang'an District, Xi'an, Shaanxi; China
- Coordinates: 34°16′18.17″N 108°45′4.15″E
- Lines: Xi'an–Chengdu high-speed railway; Xi'an Railway Hub

History
- Opened: 6 December 2017
Location

Xi'an West railway station (Chinese: 西安西站; pinyin: Xī'ānxī zhàn) is a railway station in Wangsi Subdistrict, Chang'an District, Xi'an, Shaanxi, China. It is an intermediate stop on the Xi'an–Chengdu high-speed railway.

The station opened as Epanggong railway station (Chinese: 阿房宫站; pinyin: Ēpánggōng zhàn) on 6 December 2017. On 28 February 2023, it was renamed Xi'an West.

Preceding station	China Railway High-speed	Following station
Xi'an North Terminus	Xi'an–Chengdu high-speed railway	Huyi towards Chengdu East
