= Xi'an railway station =

Railway station in Xi'an, China

Xi'an 西安
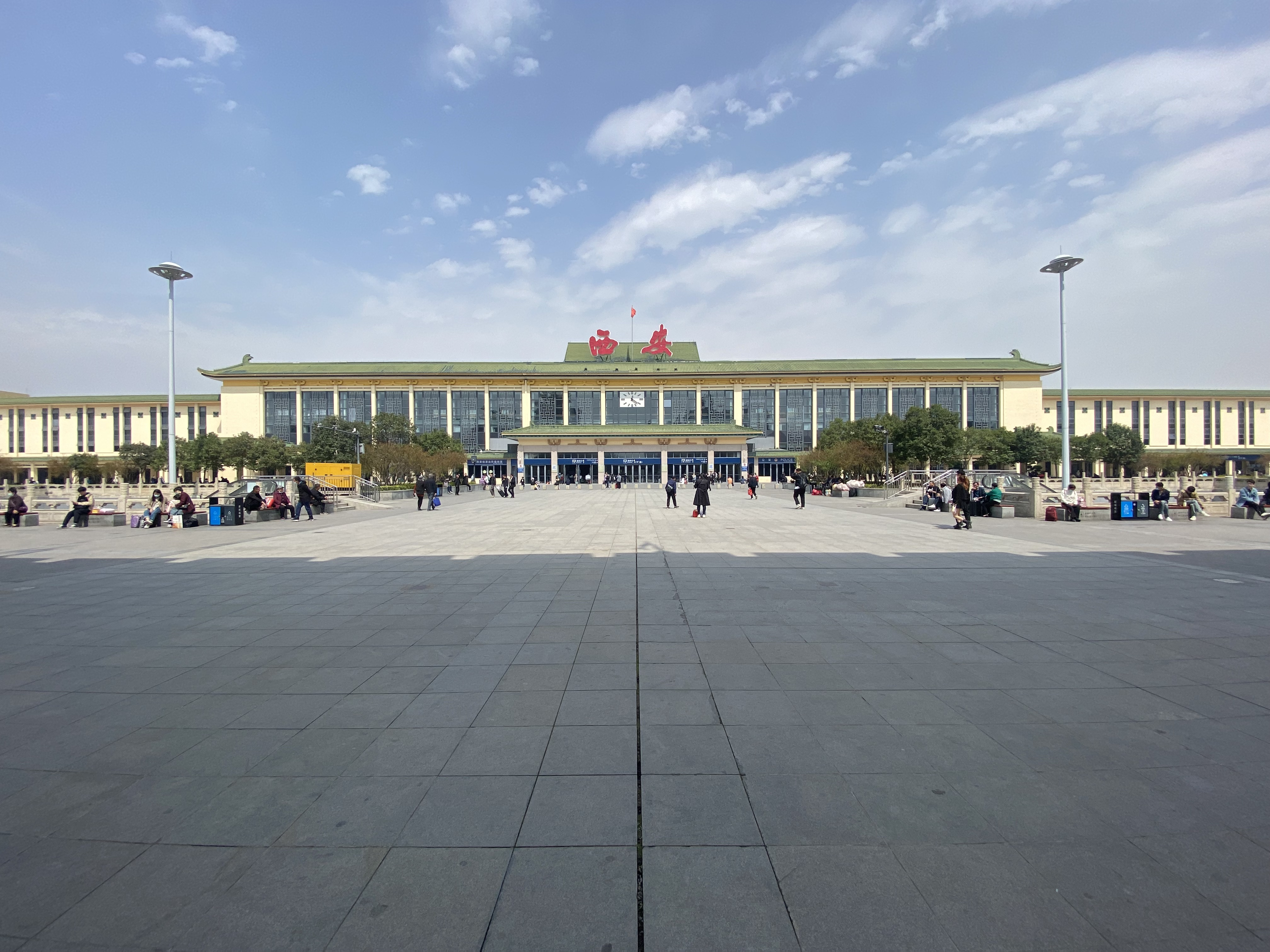
- Xi'an railway station

General information
- Location: 44 Huancheng N. Road; Xincheng District, Xi'an, Shaanxi; China
- Coordinates: 34°16′43″N 108°57′30″E
- Operator: CR Xi'an
- Lines: Houma–Xi'an railway; Longhai railway; Nanjing–Xi'an railway; Xi'an–Ankang railway; Xi'an–Yan'an railway; Xi'an Railway Hub
- Platforms: 11 (5 island platforms, 1 side platform)
- Tracks: 13
- Connections: Bus terminal, Metro Line 4

Other information
- Station code: 39473 (TMIS code); XAY (telegraph code); XAN (Pinyin code)
- Classification: Top Class station (特等站)

History
- Opened: June 1935

Services
Preceding station	China Railway	Following station
Weinan towards Lianyungang East	Longhai railway	Xianyang towards Lanzhou
Preceding station	Xi'an Metro	Following station
Hanyuandian towards Xi'an Beizhan	Line 4	Wulukou towards Hangtianxincheng
Location
- Location within China

Xi'an railway station (Chinese: 西安站; pinyin: Xī'ān Zhàn) is one of the two main passenger railway stations of Xi'an, the capital of China's Shaanxi Province. Located on the Longhai Railway and just to the north of Xi'an's historical walled city, the station had long been the main train station for the Xi'an metropolitan area. With the opening of Xi'an North railway station on the northern outskirts of the city in 2011, most of the high-speed services, including the G- and D-series trains of the Zhengzhou–Xi'an high-speed railway, have been transferred to the new station. Xi'an railway station remains the main station for all conventional rail service in the city, including the overnight Z-series expresses, T-series express trains, and all slower services.

== History ==
As of 2021, works are underway to upgrade the station, increasing the number of platforms and introducing a new station building to the north of the railway line. The new station building was opened on 31 May 2021.

== Metro station ==
Xi'anzhan station on Line 4 is the metro station serving the Xi'an railway station. The metro station opened on 25 September 2022. In the long-term planning, Line 7 will also serve the Xi'an railway station.

== Gallery ==
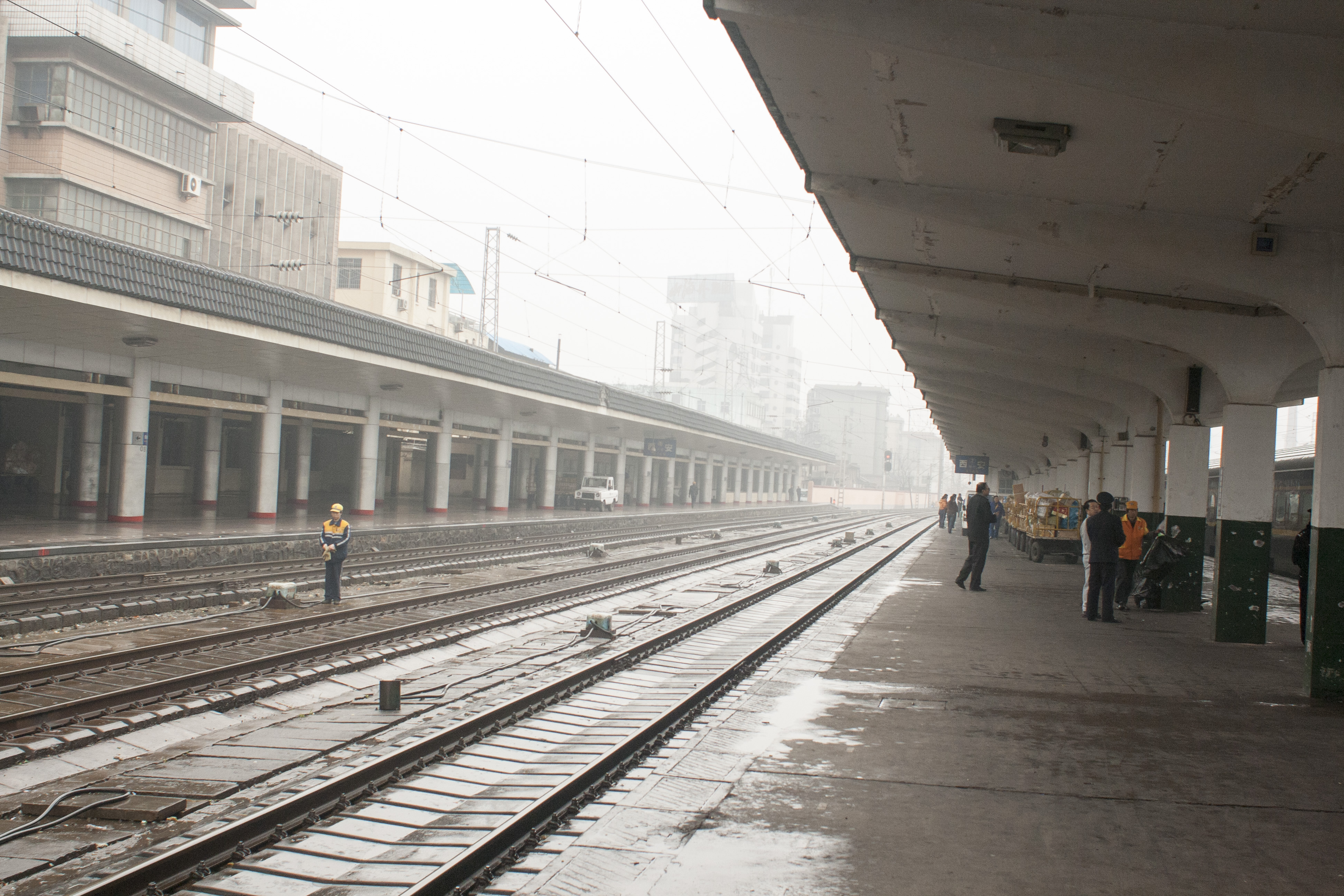
Platform

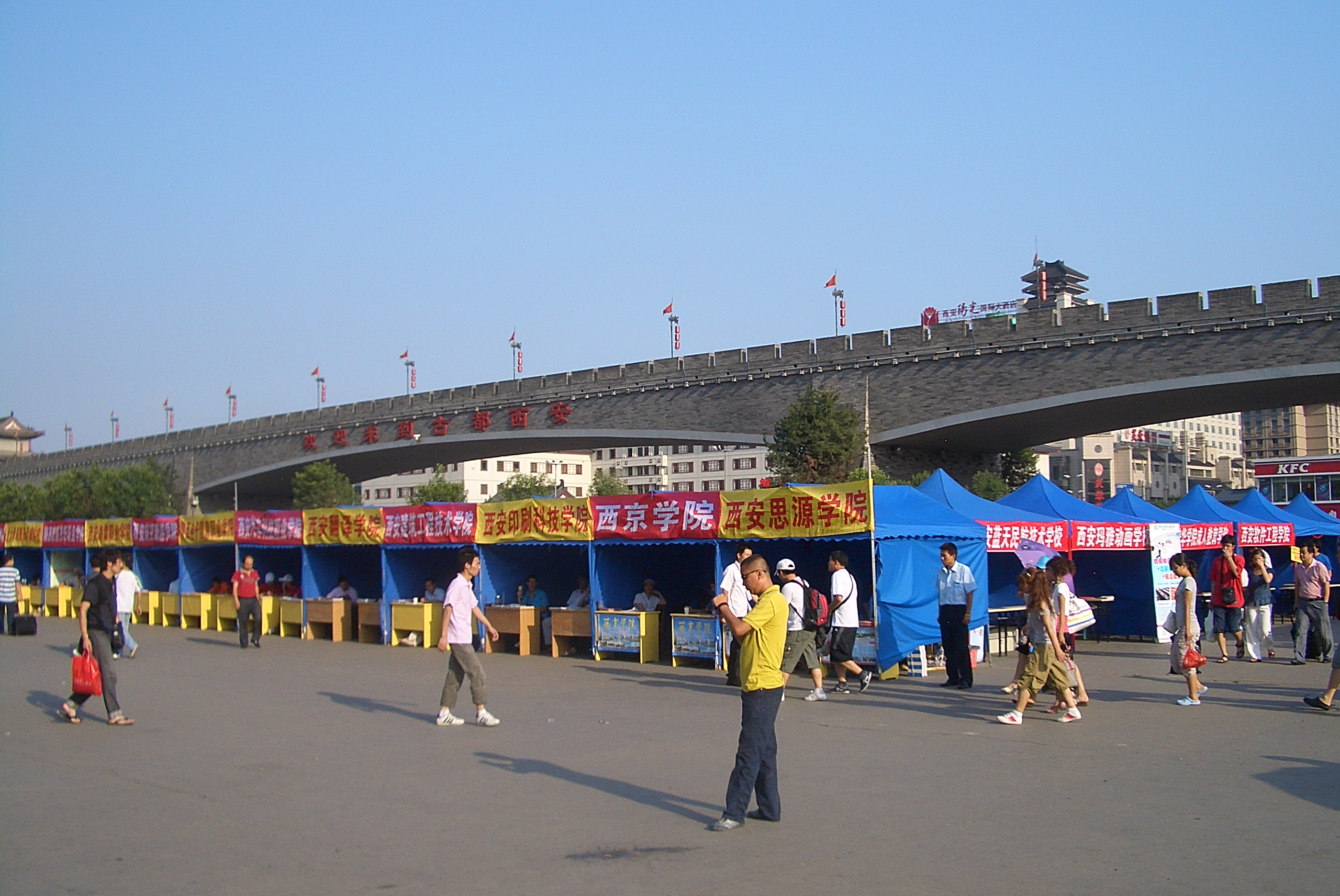
Welcome booths set up by Xi'an's university and colleges for their new students on the plaza in front of Xi'an railway station

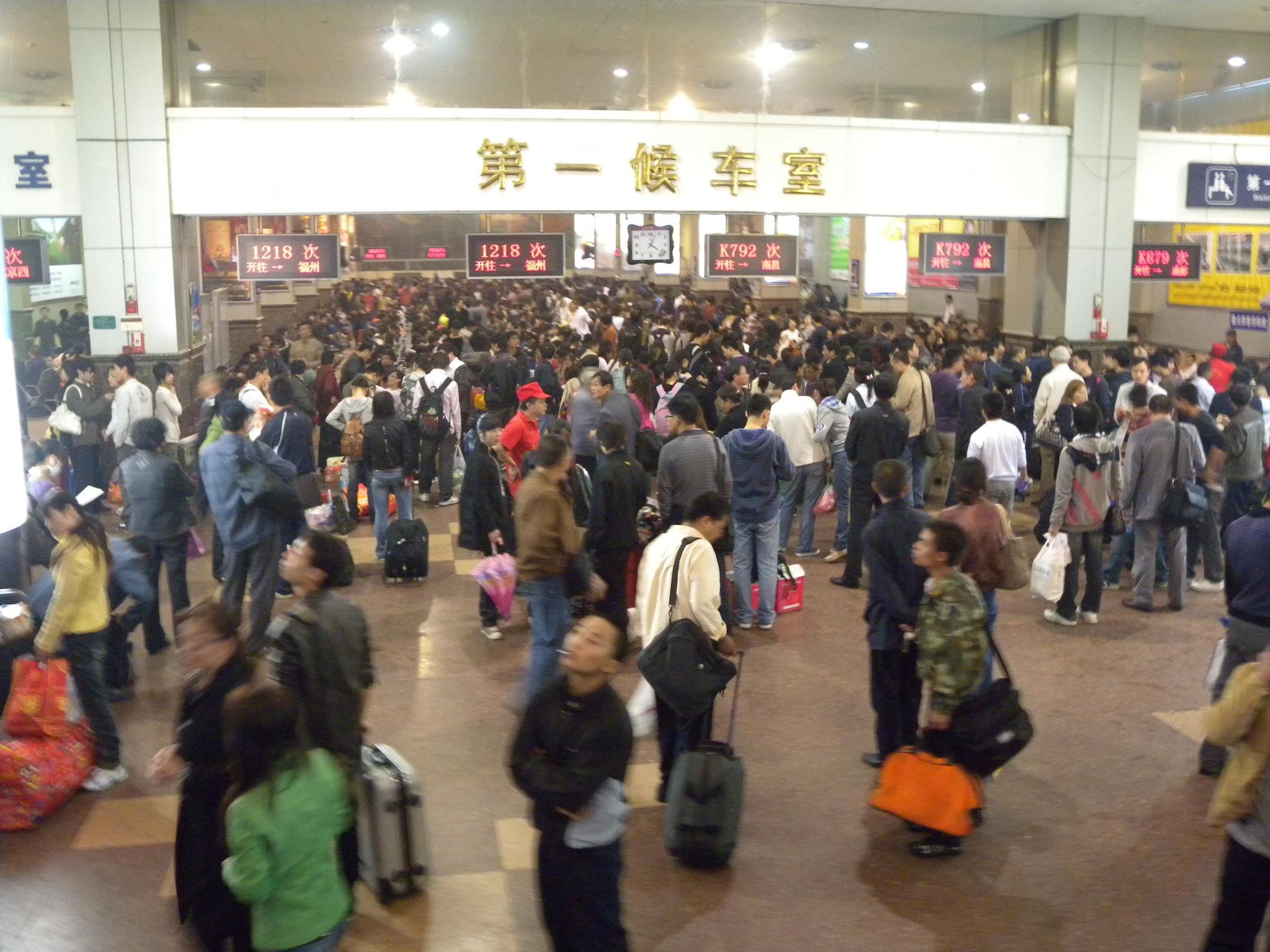
Waiting Room 1

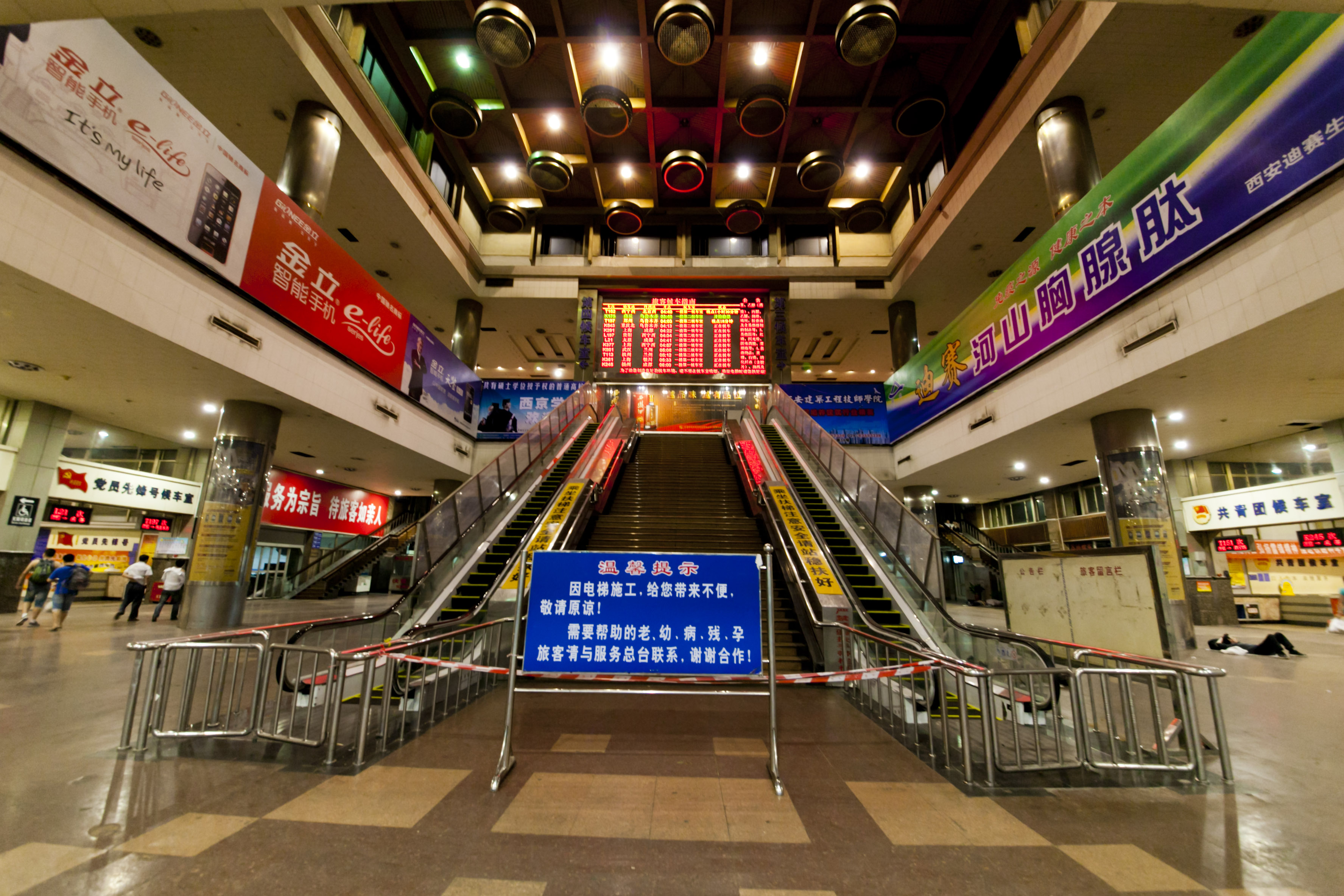
Station hall

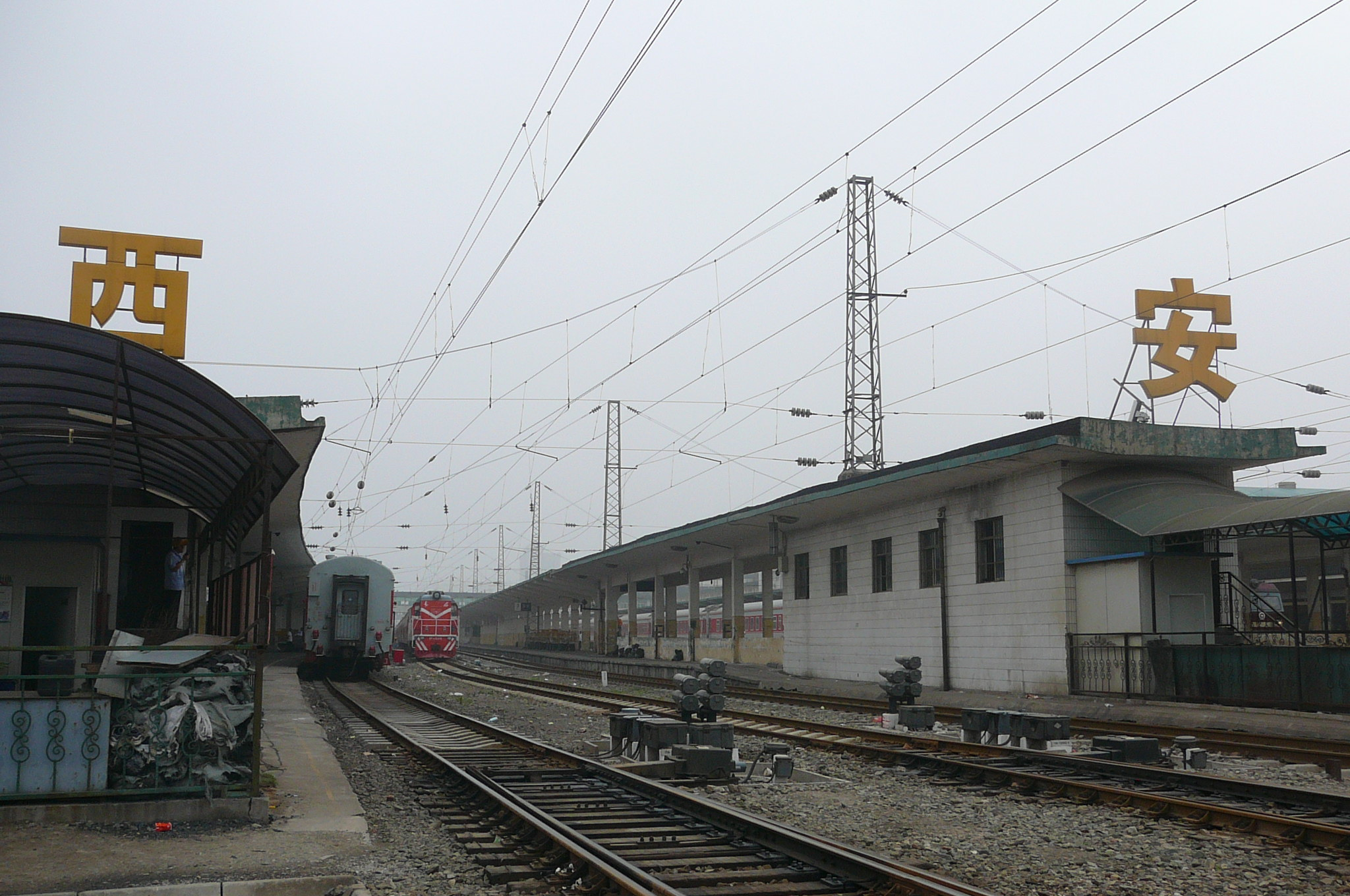
Signs of the station

== See also ==
- Xi'an North railway station
