= Xi'an North railway station =

Railway station in Weiyang, Xi'an, Shaanxi, China

Xi'an North 西安北
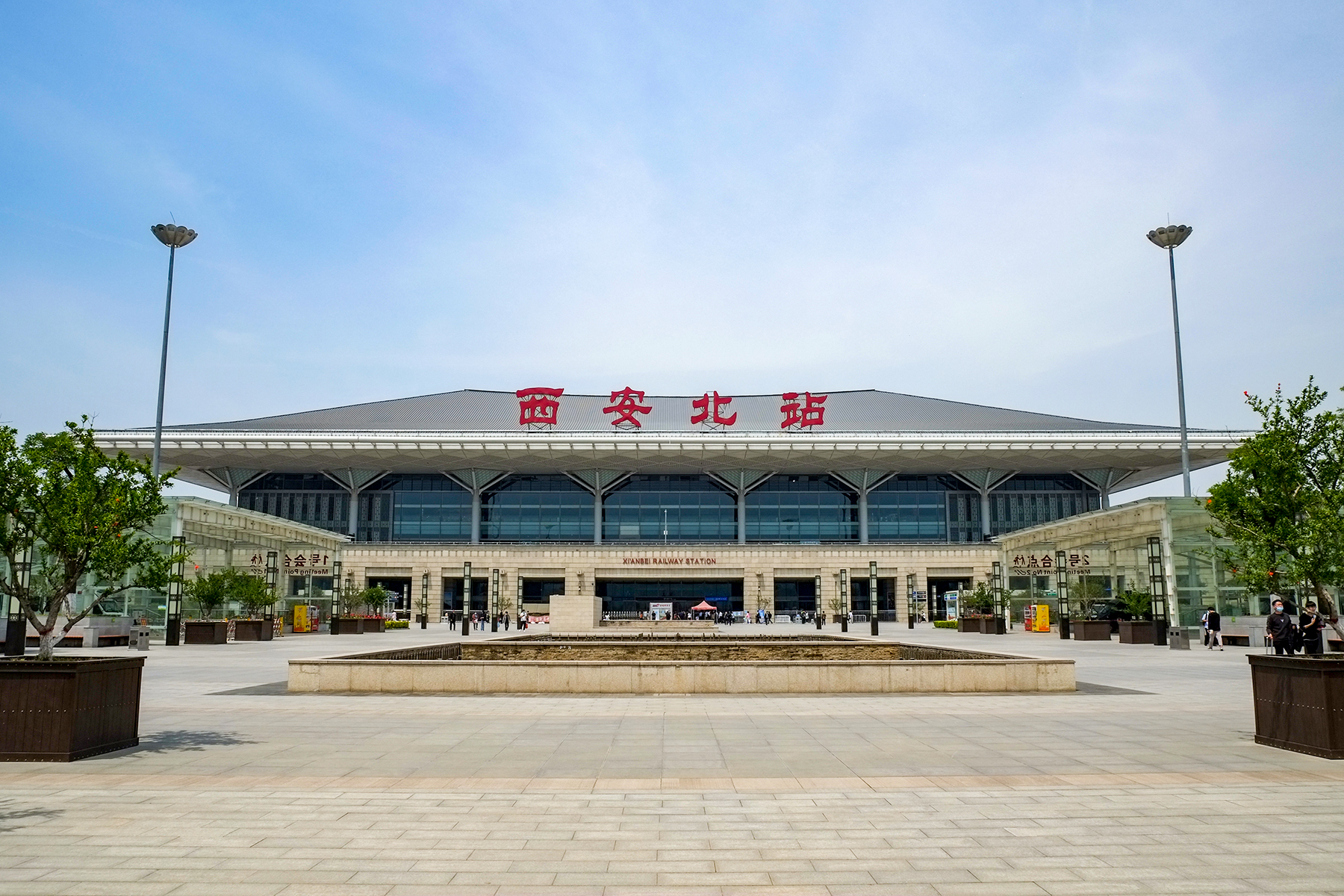
- Xi'an North railway station

General information
- Other names: Xi'anbei
- Location: Yuanshuo Road, Weiyang District, Xi'an, Shaanxi; China
- Coordinates: 34°22′39.2″N 108°56′2.7″E
- Operator: China Railway; Xi'an Railway Bureau
- Lines: Zhengzhou–Xi'an high-speed railway; Xi'an–Baoji high-speed railway; Datong–Xi'an passenger railway; Xi'an–Chengdu high-speed railway; Yinchuan–Xi'an high-speed railway; Xi'an–Yan'an high-speed railway; Xi'an Railway Hub
- Platforms: 34 (16 island platforms, 2 side platforms)
- Connections: Beikezhan station (Line 2 & Line 4 & Line 14); Bus terminal

Other information
- Station code: TMIS code: 39032; Telegraph code: EAY; Pinyin code: XAB
- Classification: Top Class station

History
- Opened: 11 January 2011; 15 years ago
Location

Xi'an North railway station (Chinese: 西安北站; pinyin: Xī'ānběi Zhàn) is a railway station on the Zhengxi Passenger Railway, Xibao Passenger Railway and Daxi Passenger Railway. The station is located in Weiyang District of Xi'an, the capital of Shaanxi province. It is some 10 km (6.2 mi) north of the city centre and the Xi'an railway station.

The station has 34 platforms. It is the largest railway station in Northwest China.

== History ==
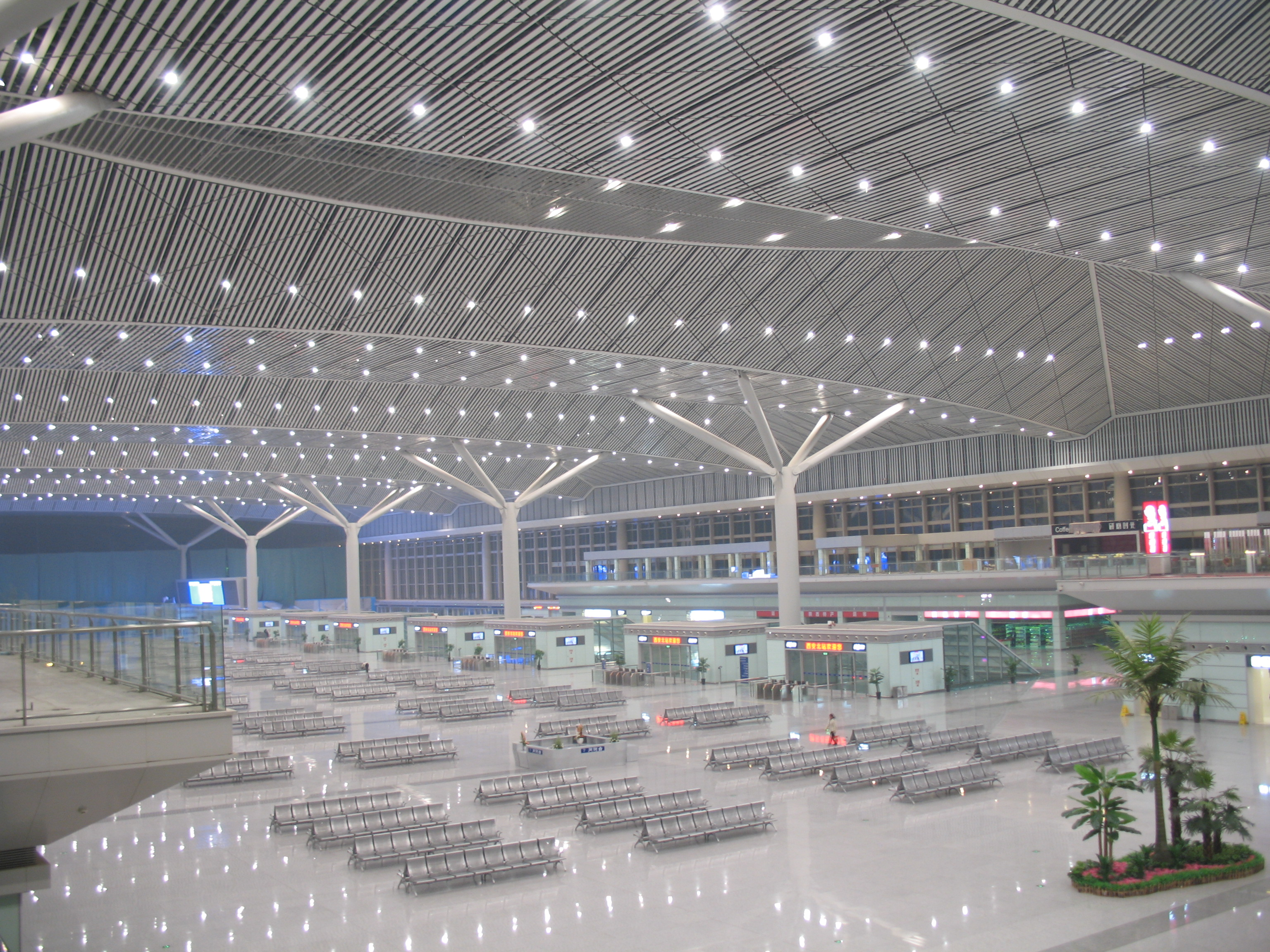
Main station concourse

Construction began on 19 September 2008. The station was opened on 11 January 2011. It has since been expanded.

== Service ==
=== Rail ===
Xi'an North station is served by the fast (G-series and D-series) trains running on the Zhengzhou–Xi'an High-Speed Railway, Xi'an–Baoji High-Speed Railway, Yinchuan–Xi'an high-speed railway and Datong–Xi'an Passenger Railway, Xi'an–Chengdu high-speed railway. All other passenger trains serving Xi'an run from Xi'an railway station, just north of downtown.

=== Metro ===
The station is connected to Line 2 of Xi'an Metro at Beikezhan station, and connected to Line 4 and Line 14 of Xi'an Metro at Beikezhan (Beiguangchang) station.

Preceding station	China Railway High-speed	Following station
Weinan North towards Zhengzhou	Zhengzhou–Xi'an high-speed railway Part of the Eurasia Continental Bridge corridor	Terminus
Weinan North towards Datong South	Datong–Xi'an high-speed railway	Terminus
Terminus	Xi'an–Baoji high-speed railway	Xianyang West towards Baoji South
Terminus	Xi'an–Chengdu high-speed railway	Xi'an West towards Chengdu East
