= Xi'an–Ankang railway =

Railway line in Shaanxi, China

Xi'an–Ankang railway 西康铁路
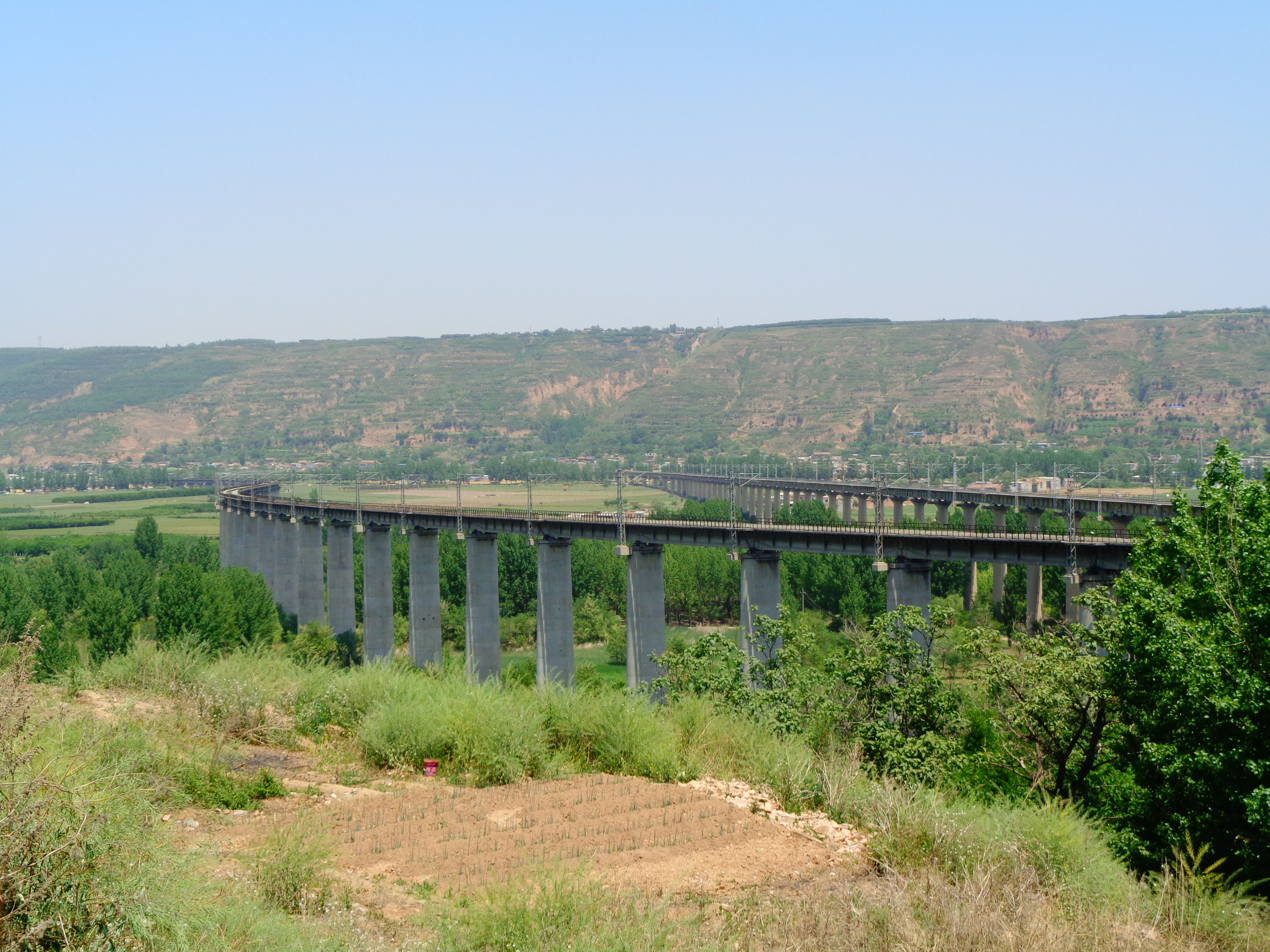
- The Xi'an–Ankang railway crossing the Chan River in Xi'an

Overview
- Status: Operational
- Locale: Xi'an and Ankang, Shaanxi, China
- Stations: 28

Service
- Type: Heavy rail
- Operator: CR Xi'an

History
- Opened: 31 October 2001

Technical
- Line length: 267.49 km (166.21 mi)
- Number of tracks: 2
- Track gauge: 1,435 mm (4 ft 8 1/2 in)
- Electrification: 25 kV 50 Hz AC (Overhead line)
- Operating speed: 160 km/h (99 mph)
- Signalling: ABS

The Xi'an–Ankang railway or Xikang railway (simplified Chinese: 西康铁路; traditional Chinese: 西康鐵路; pinyin: Xīkāng tiělù), is a double-track, electrified railway line in Shaanxi Province of China, between Xi'an, the provincial capital, and Ankang. The line is 247.7 km (154 mi) long and was built from 1996 to 2001. Major cities and counties along route include Xi'an, Zhashui County, Zhen'an County, Xunyang County and Ankang.

== History ==
Construction on the line began on 18 December 1996. The railway opened on 8 January 2001. The second track was completed and put into operation on 31 October 2013.

On 5 November 2018, a new double-track 35.5-kilometre (22.1 mi) long line from Dalingpu to Ankang was opened. This line bypasses Xunyang North railway station, shortening the distance between Xi'an and Ankang by 27 kilometres (17 mi) and increasing capacity. The line has a design speed of 160 kilometres per hour (99 mph) in certain sections.

In December 2020, new direct services were introduced between Xunyang railway station and Xi'an railway station. Previously this journey required a change at Xunyang North. These services are operated by China Railway CR200J units.

== Line description ==
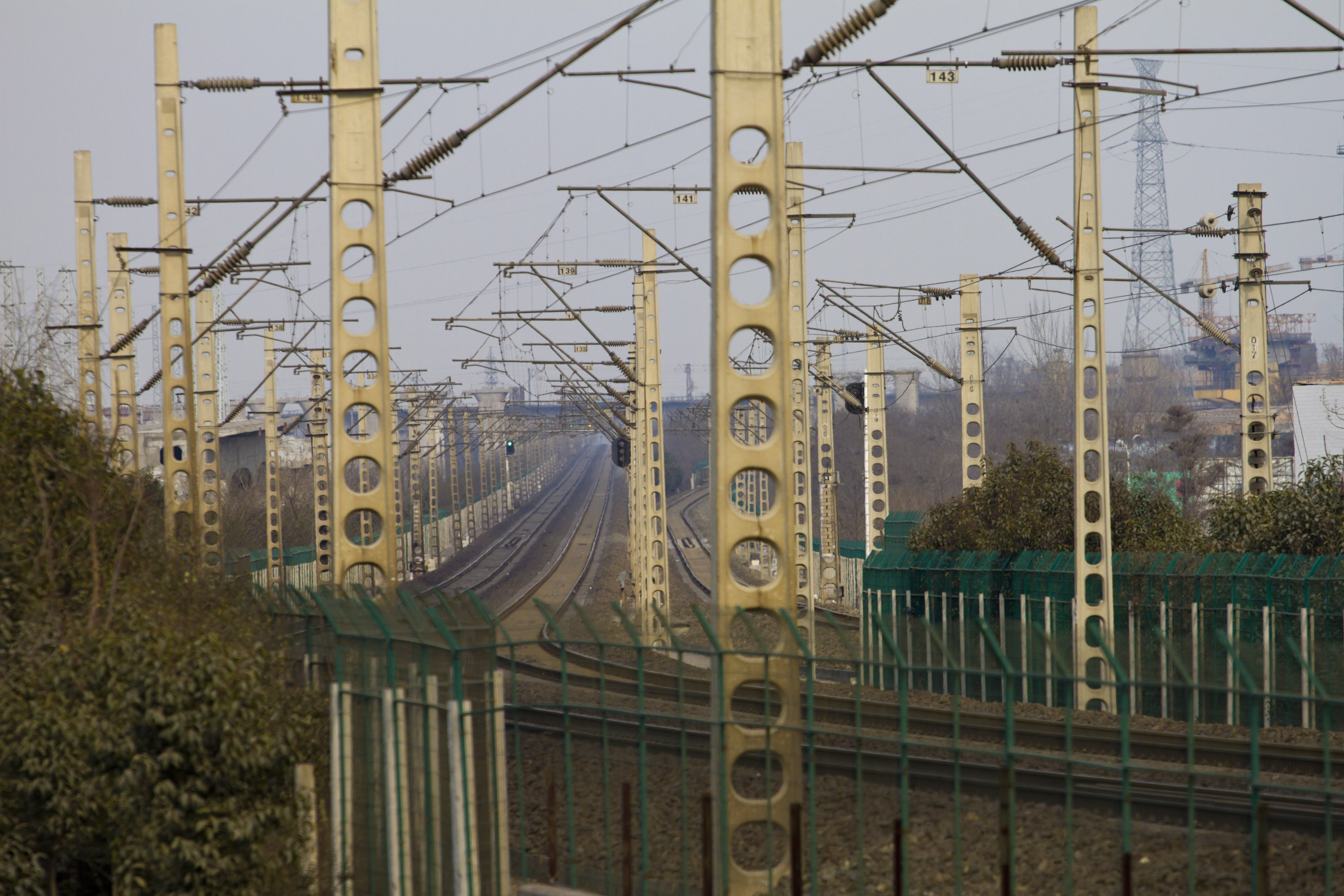
Electrified tracks of the Xikang railway (right) running parallel with the Longhai railway at Baqiao in Xi'an

The Xikang railway traverses the Qin Mountains, one of the geographic barriers that separate North and South China. Xi'an, the provincial capital is located in the Wei River Valley and Ankang in southern Shaanxi is located in the Han River (Yangtze River tributary) Valley. Notably, the railway crosses under Niubeiliang National Forest Park through the Zhongnanshan Railway Tunnel. The Xikang line connects two of China's major east-west rail corridors, the Longhai railway and the Xiangyang–Chongqing railway and shortened travel distance between the two cities by 542 km (337 mi) and travel time by 14 hours. Due to the rugged terrain of southern Shaanxi, the line has 41.2 km (26 mi) of bridges and 139.6 km (87 mi) of tunnels including the Qinling Tunnel, which is 18.5 km (11 mi) long and 1.6 km (1 mi) underneath the mountain at its deepest point. The line was funded by low-interest development assistance loans from Japan.

The planned Xi'an–Ankang high-speed railway will connect Xi'an and Ankang in the future on a faster alignment with a maximum speed of 350 kilometres per hour (220 mph).

== Rail connections ==
- Xi'an: Longhai railway, Xi'an–Yan'an railway, Houma–Xi'an railway, Nanjing–Xi'an railway
- Ankang: Xiangyang–Chongqing railway, Yangpingguan–Ankang railway

== See also ==
- List of railways in China
