= Baotou–Xi'an railway =

Railway line in China

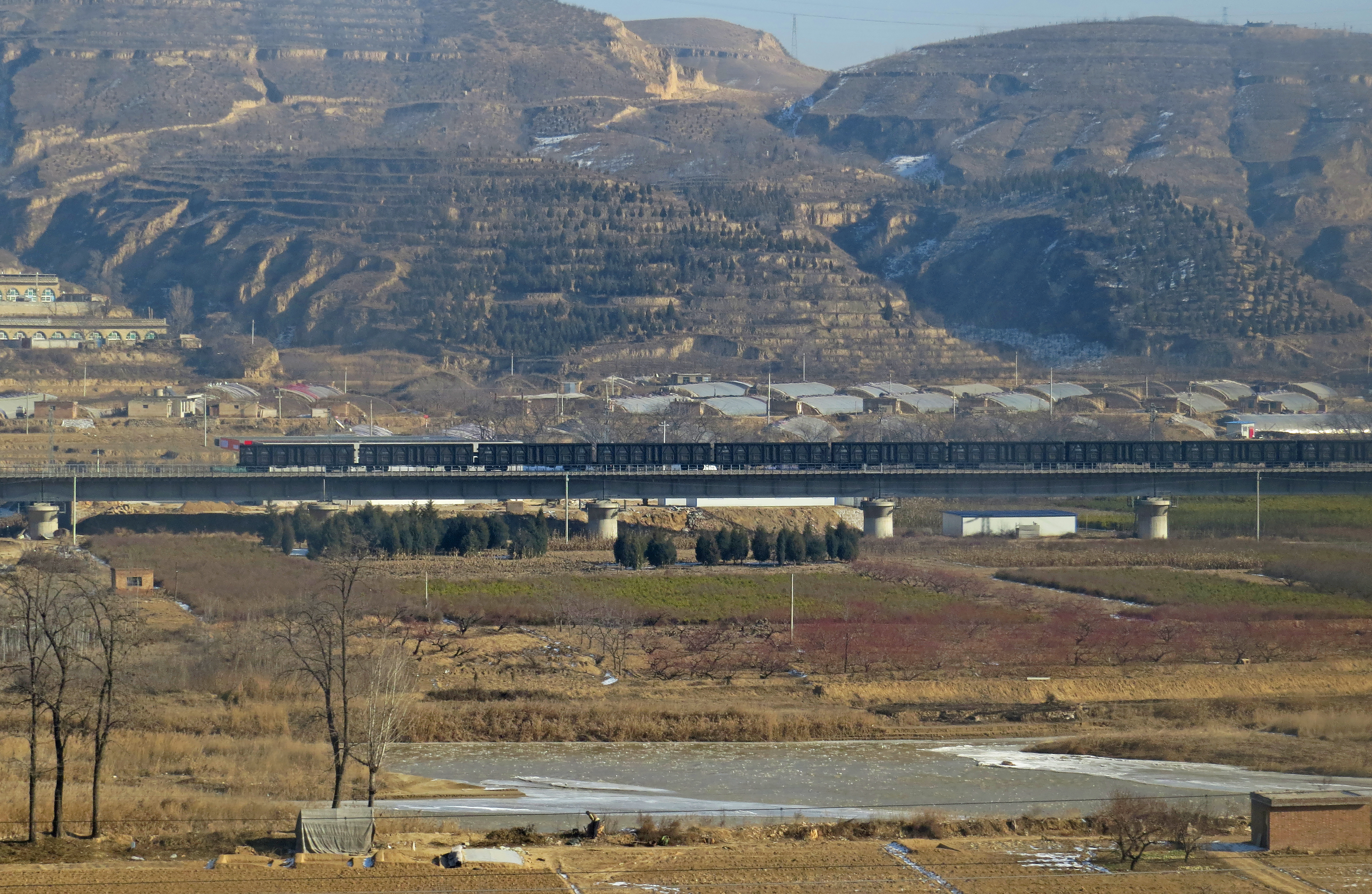
- Baotou–Xi'an railway

Overview
- Status: Operational
- Termini: Baotou; Zhangqiao

Service
- Type: Heavy rail

History
- Opened: 26 December 2009 (Baotou-Ordos); 28 December 2010 (Ordos-Xi'an)

Technical
- Line length: 801 km (498 mi)
- Track gauge: 1,435 mm (4 ft 8 1/2 in) standard gauge
- Electrification: 50 Hz 25,000 V

The Baotou–Xi'an railway is a railway line in China.

== History ==
The first section of the railway, between Baotou and Ordos, opened on 26 December 2009. The remaining section, between Ordos and Xi'an, opened on 28 December 2010.

== Future ==
The southern section of this line, between Yan'an and Xi'an, will be bypassed by the Xi'an–Yan'an high-speed railway, currently under construction.
