= Houma–Xi'an railway =

Railway line in China

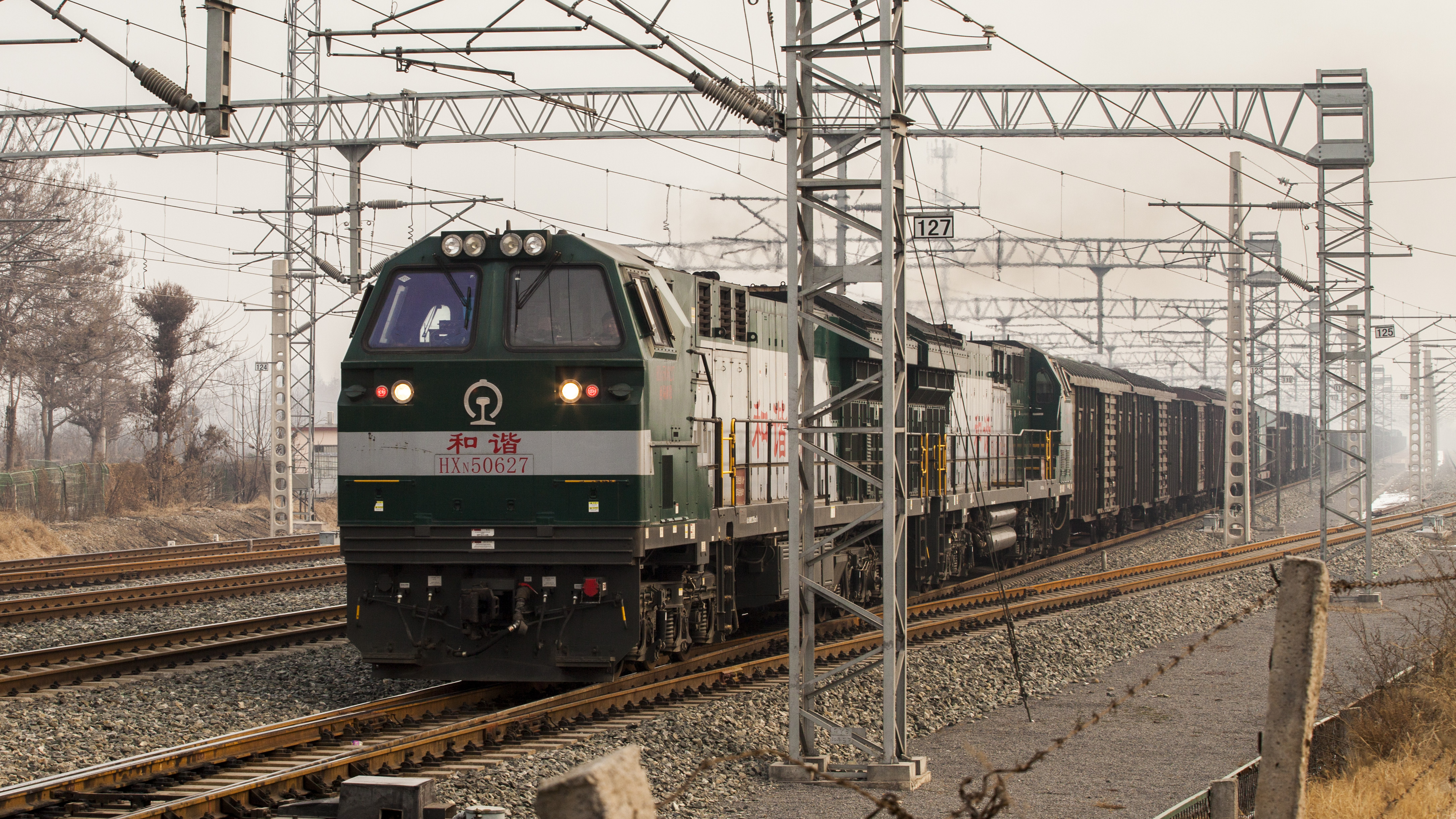
Houma–Xi'an railway

The Houma–Xi'an railway or Houxi railway (simplified Chinese: 侯西铁路; traditional Chinese: 侯西鐵路; pinyin: hóuxī tiělù), is a railroad in northern China, between Houma in Shanxi Province and Xi'an in neighboring Shaanxi Province. The railway has a total length of 289 km. Construction of the line began in the 1950s, was restarted in 1983 and was completed in 1985. Major cities and towns along route include Houma, Hancheng, Fuping and Xi'an.

== Rail connections ==
- Houma: Datong–Puzhou railway, Houma–Yueshan railway
- Xi'an: Longhai railway, Xi'an–Ankang railway, Baotou–Xi'an railway.

== See also ==
- List of railways in China
