= Longhai railway =

Railway line in People's Republic of China

Longhai railway 陇海铁路
- Two HXD1-hauled freight trains meet near Yuanlong station in Tianshui, Gansu

Overview
- Status: Operational
- Locale: People's Republic of China: Jiangsu; Anhui; Henan; Shaanxi; Gansu
- Termini: Lianyungang East; Lanzhou

Service
- Type: Heavy rail
- System: China Railway
- Operator(s): China Railway Shanghai Group; China Railway Zhengzhou Group; China Railway Xi'an Group; China Railway Lanzhou Group

Technical
- Line length: 1,759 km (1,093 mi)
- Track gauge: 1,435 mm (4 ft 8 1/2 in)

The Longhai railway (Chinese: 陇海铁路; pinyin: Lǒnghǎi Tiělù), formerly romanized as the Lunghai railway, is a major arterial east–west railway in China. It runs from Lianyungang, Jiangsu, on the Yellow Sea, to Lanzhou, Gansu, through the provinces of Jiangsu, Anhui, Henan, Shaanxi, and Gansu, covering a total length of 1,759 kilometres (1,093 mi). The line is named after Gansu, also known as Long (陇) in Chinese, and Lianyungang's previous name, Haizhou. The Longhai Line is one of the busiest Chinese railways. It has dual tracks throughout and electrification was completed in 2009.

== History ==
The Longhai railway was built over the course of half a century by four different governments of China: the Qing dynasty, the Beiyang Government, the Nationalist Government and the People's Republic.

The first section of the railway, entirely within Henan, from Kaifeng to Luoyang was built from 1905 to 1909 by a venture between the Qing dynasty and a Belgian joint-stock company backed by France and Russia. This line, known as the Bianliang–Luoyang railway, began operation on January 1, 1910.

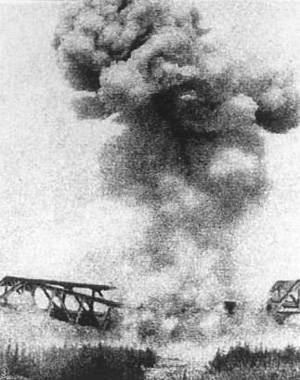
Longhai railway bombarded during World War II

The line was extended eastward to Xuzhou in 1916 and to Haizhou in 1925 with Dutch financing. In the west, the line was extended to Lingbao, Henan, in 1927 with Belgian financing. After the Northern Expedition, the Nanjing-based Republican government took control of construction and extended the line further west to Tongguan, Shaanxi, in 1931; Xi'an in 1934; Baoji, Shaanxi, in 1936; and Tianshui, Gansu, in 1945.

The railway was the centerpiece of Japanese operations in Henan during the Second Sino-Japanese War, with the Imperial Japanese Army repeatedly attempting to seize the railway in 1938 in the Battle of Northern and Eastern Henan and later during Operation Ichi-Go.

Construction of the Tianshui to Lanzhou section, entirely within Gansu, broke ground in May 1946 but was halted by the Chinese Civil War, then resumed under the People's Republic in April 1950 and was completed in July 1953. At this time, the entire Longhai railway entered into operation.

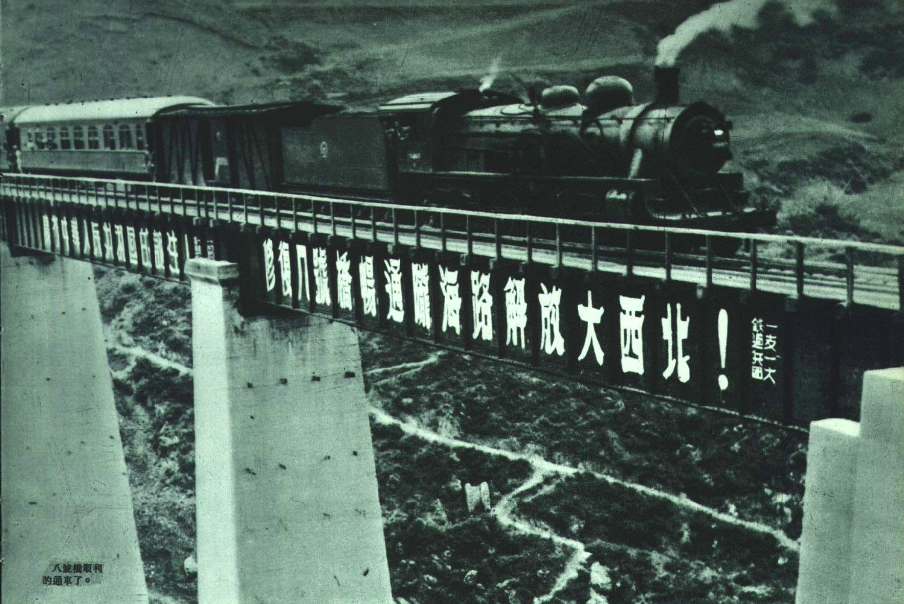
No. 8 Bridge on the Longhai railway rebuilt by the PLA Rail Corps in 1950

In the late 1950s through early 1960s, new railways were built from Lanzhou to the west: the Lanzhou–Xinjiang railway to Xinjiang (later connected to Kazakhstan) and the Lanzhou–Qinghai railway to Qinghai (later extended to Tibet).

From 1956 to 1970, the section between Zhengzhou, Henan, and Baoji, Shaanxi, was upgraded to the dual-track line. During the same time, in Henan the line near Sanmenxia was re-routed due to the Sanmenxia Reservoir Project. The Zhengzhou to Shangqiu section was converted to dual-track in 1980.

The railway is a central section in the New Eurasian Land Bridge.

== Cities and rail junctions along route ==
Jiangsu

- Lianyungang
- Xinyi: Jiaozhou–Xinyi railway, Xinyi–Changxing railway
- Xuzhou: Beijing–Shanghai railway

Anhui

- Dangshan

Henan

- Shangqiu: Beijing–Kowloon railway
- Kaifeng
- Zhengzhou: Beijing–Guangzhou railway
- Luoyang: Jiaozuo–Liuzhou railway
- Sanmenxia

Shaanxi

- Tongguan: Datong–Puzhou railway
- Mengyuan
- Weinan
- Xi'an: Nanjing–Xi'an railway, Houma–Xi'an railway, Xi'an–Ankang railway
- Xianyang: Xianyang–Tongchuan railway
- Baoji: Baoji–Chengdu railway

Gansu

- Tianshui
- Dingxi
- Lanzhou: Lanzhou–Xinjiang railway, Lanzhou–Qinghai railway, Baotou–Lanzhou railway

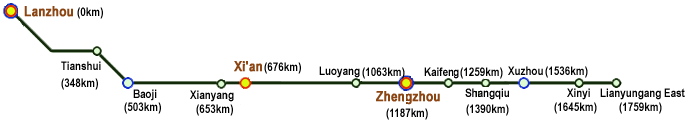
The Primary stops on the Longhai railway for passenger rail

== High-speed rail line parallel to the Longhai ==
The Xuzhou–Lanzhou high-speed railway, a high-speed rail line, has been built parallel to the Longhai line. The Zhengzhou–Xi'an section opened in February 2010. The last section of the corridor, the Baoji–Lanzhou high-speed railway was completed on 9 July 2017.

The corridor was extended with the opening in February 2021 of the Lianyungang–Xuzhou high-speed railway, which runs parallel to the Longhai line between Xuzhou and Lianyungang.

== Gallery ==
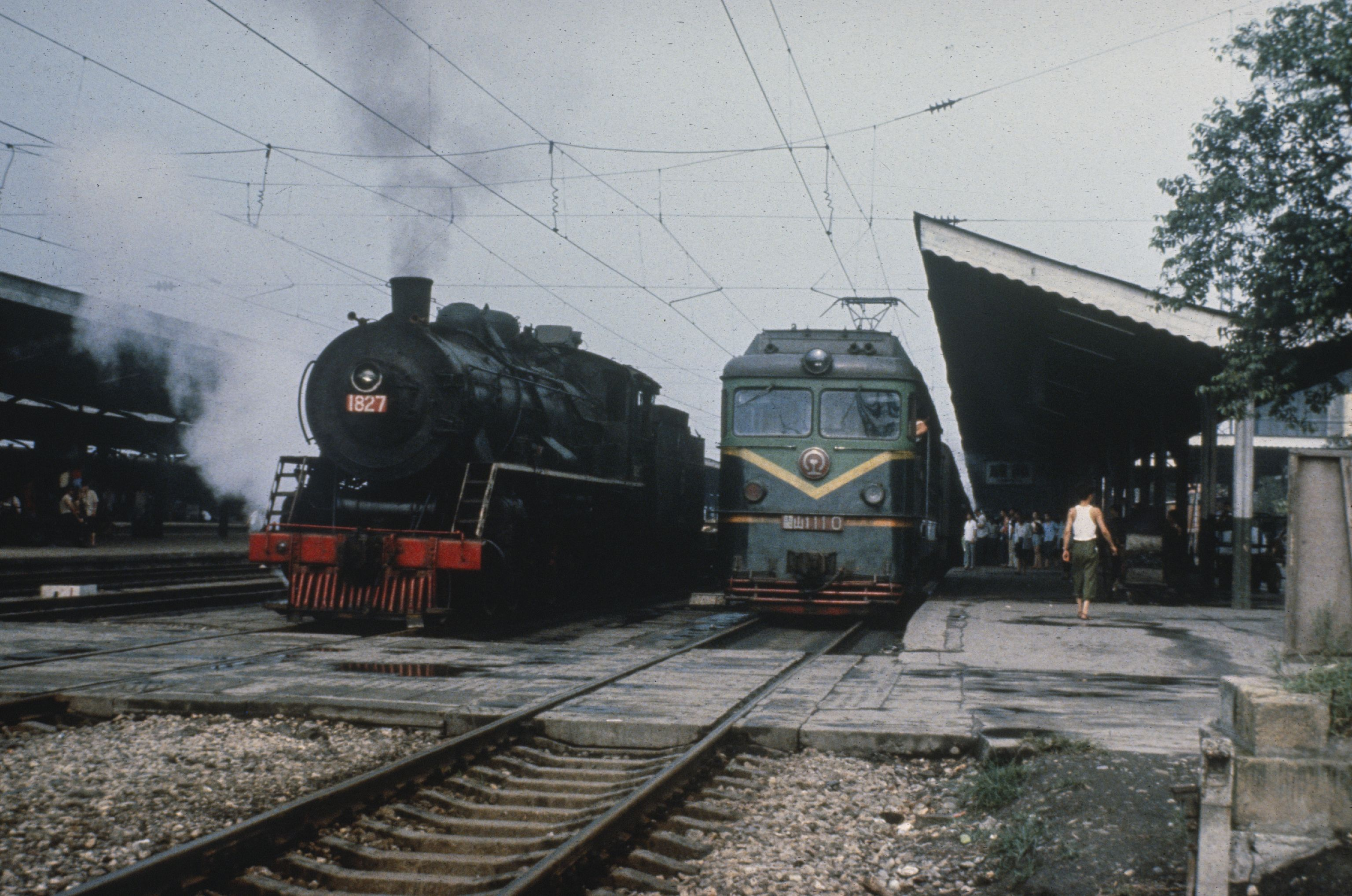
Station platform at Baoji in 1981

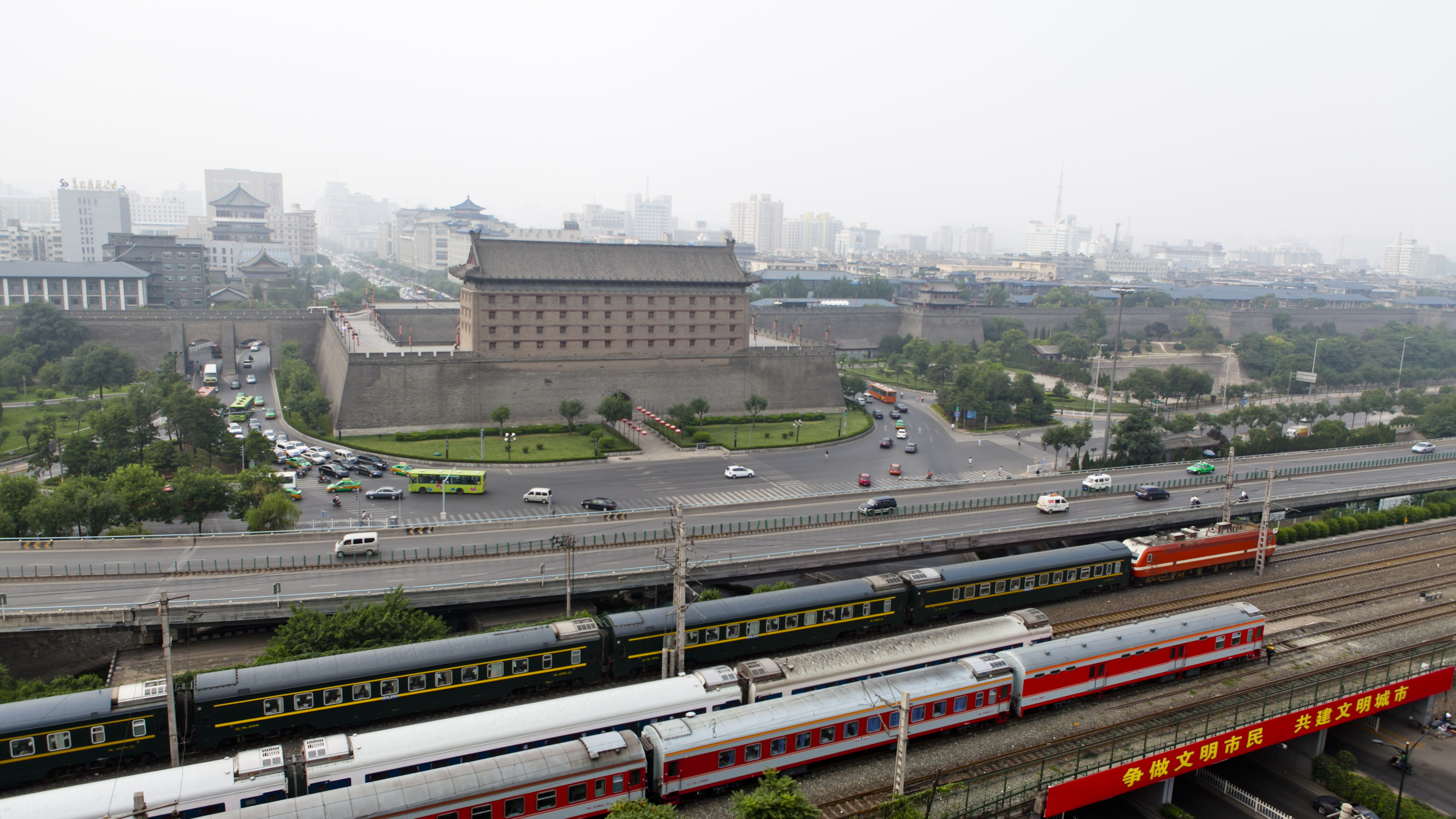
Longhai railway outside the city walls of Xi'an

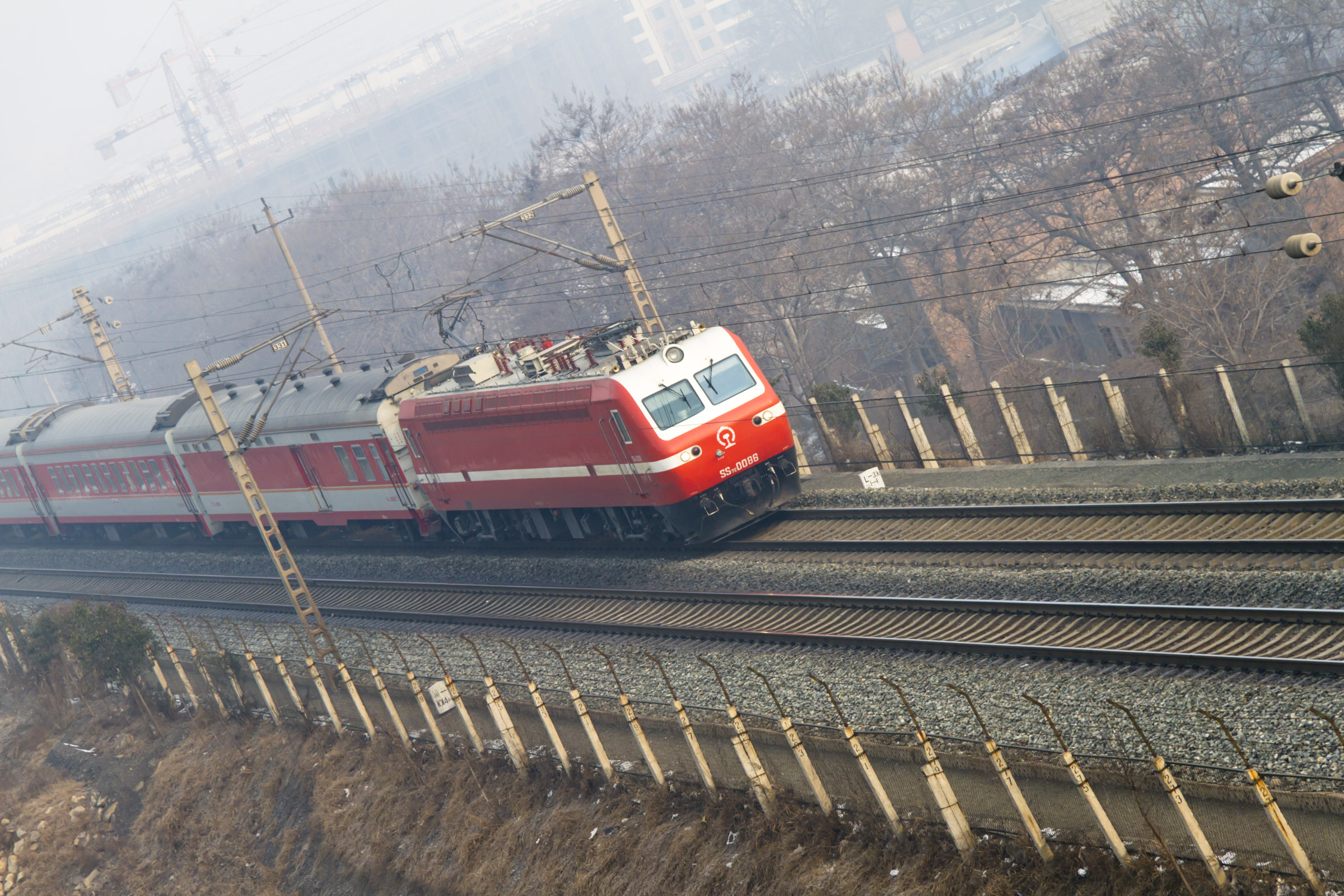
A SS7E electric locomotive on the electrified Longhai railway

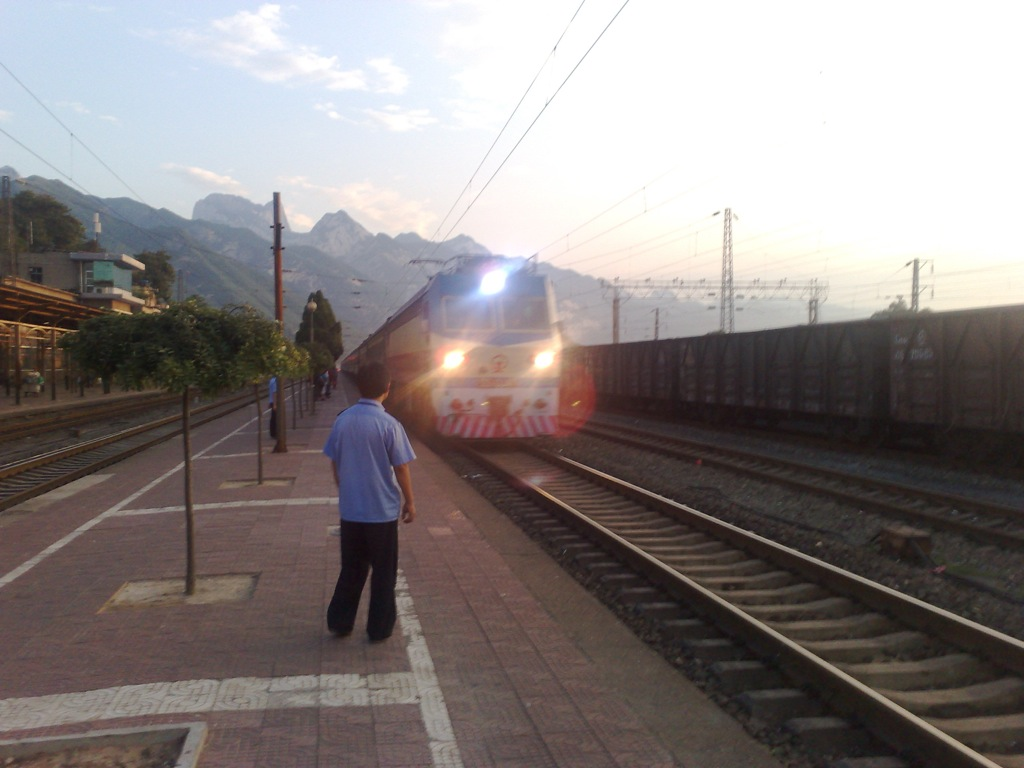
Station platform at Huashan

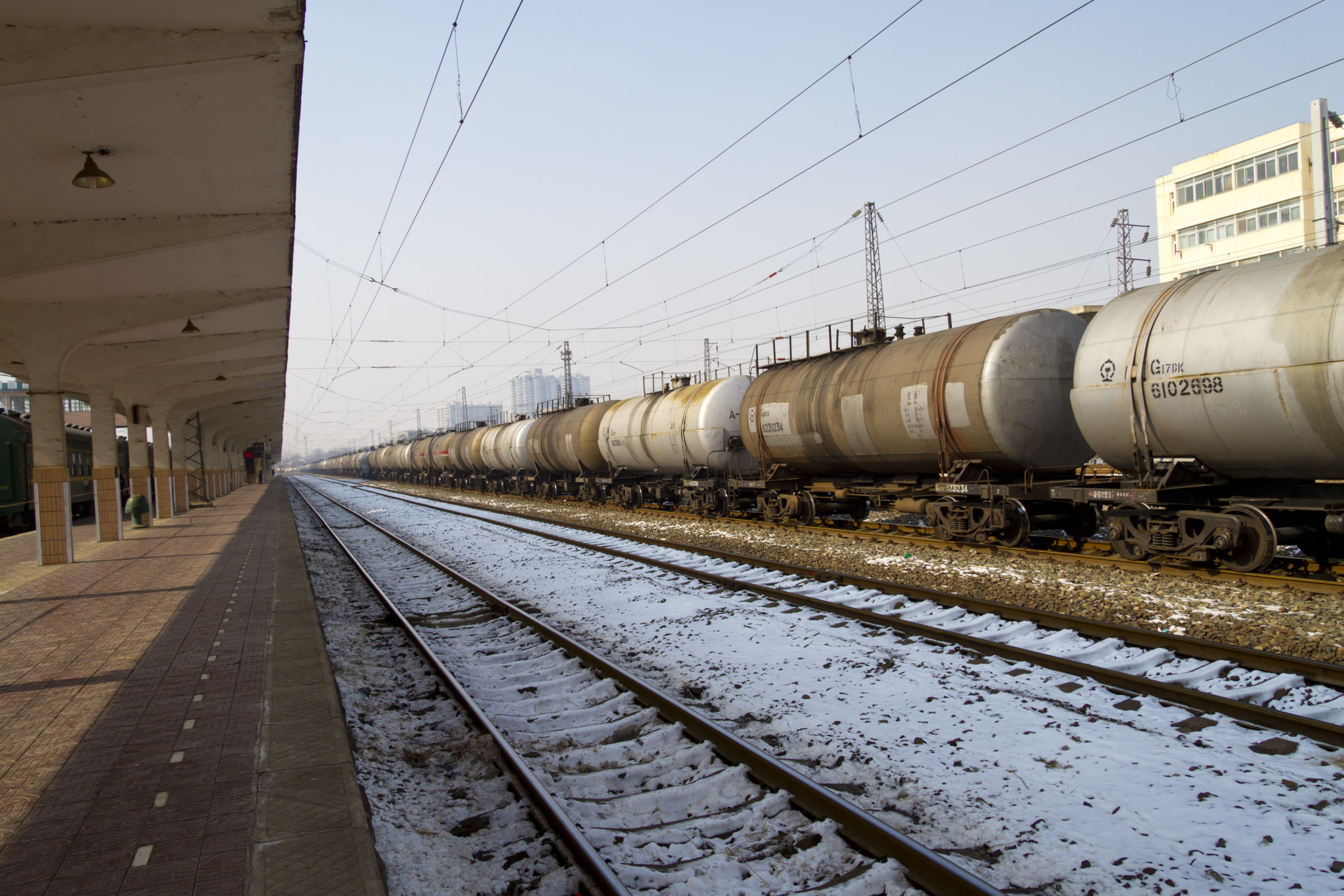
Railway tracks in Xianyang

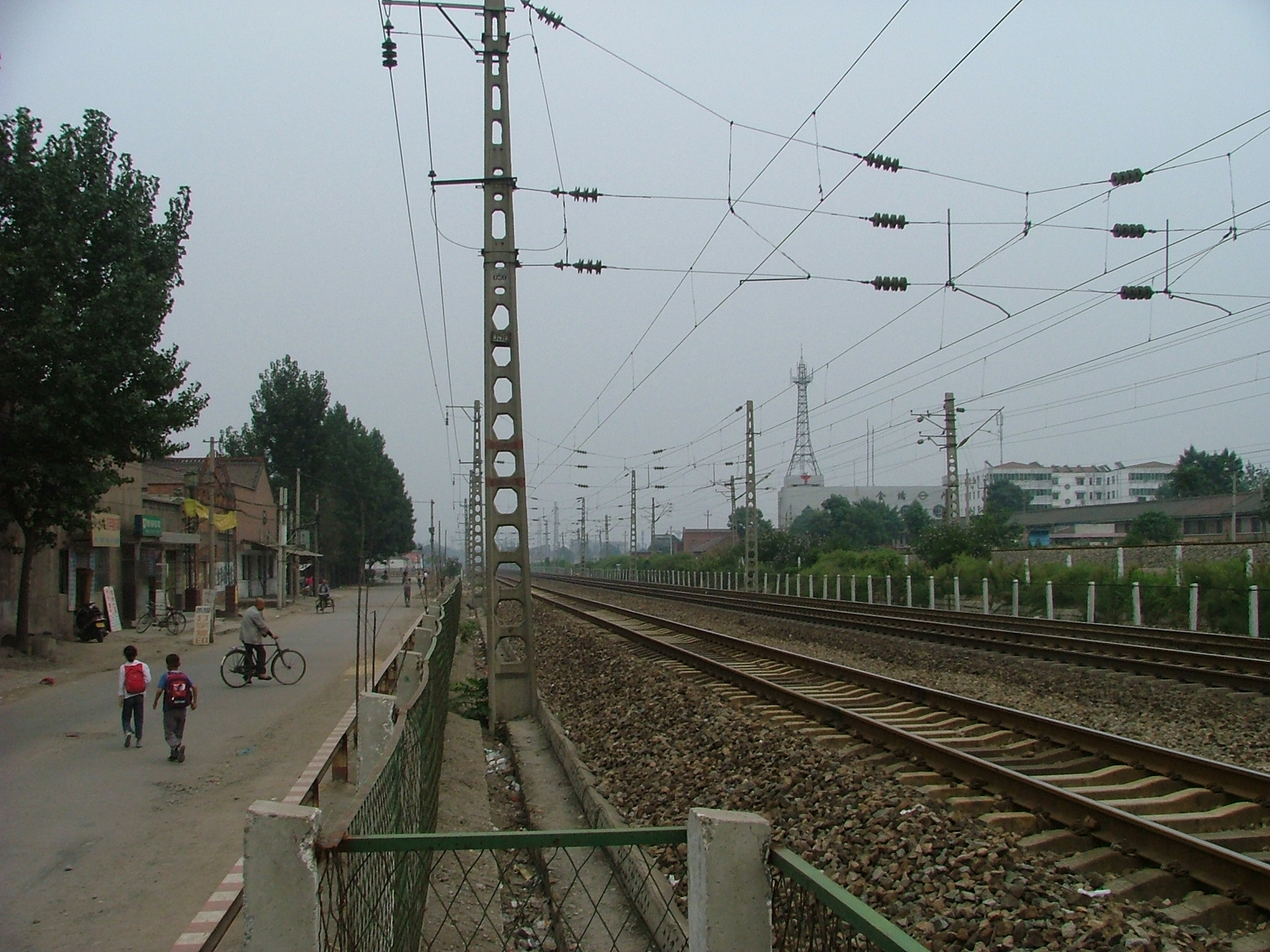
Railway tracks in Baoji

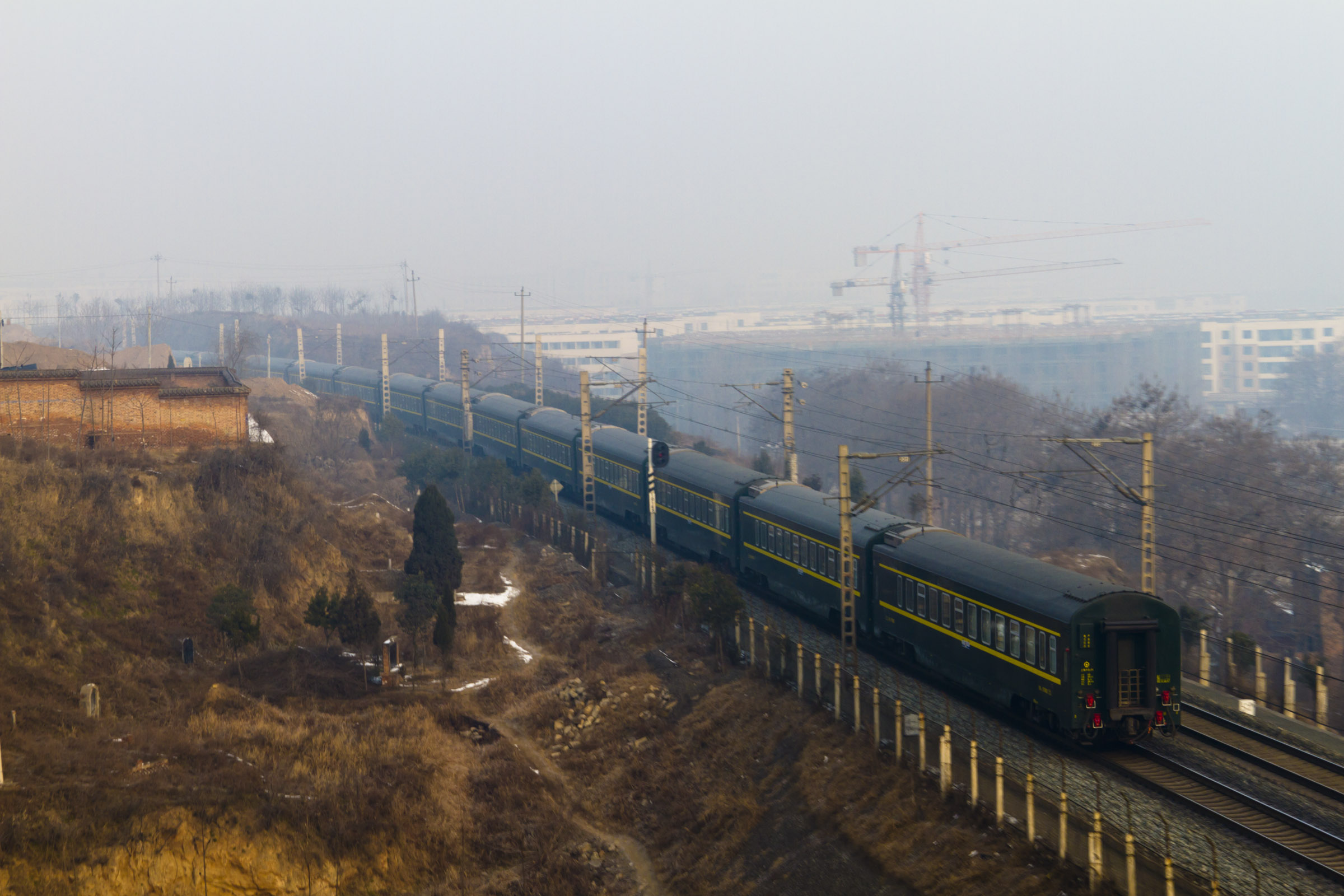
Shanghai–Lhasa train near Weinan

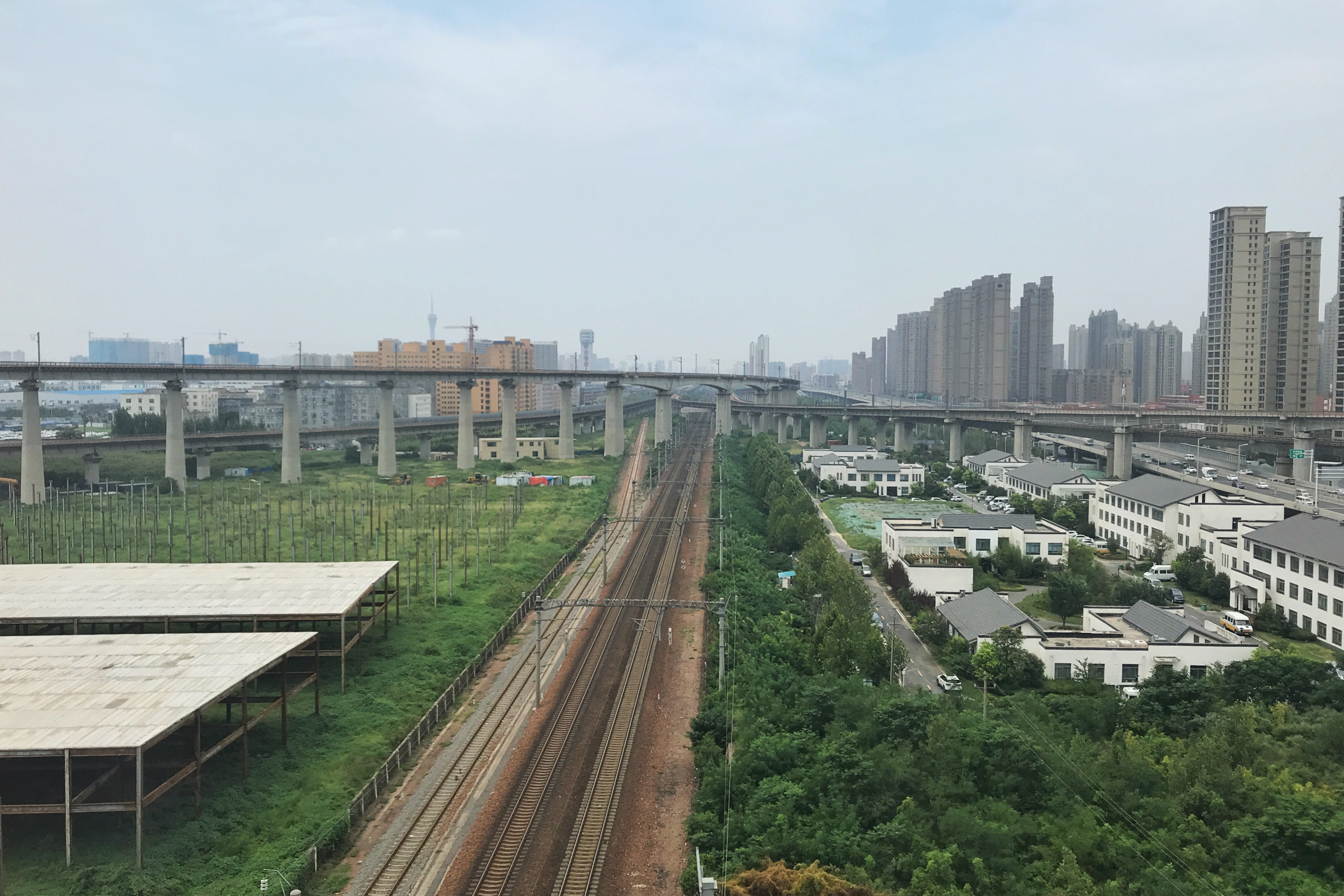
The railway in east Zhengzhou

== See also ==
- Rail transport in China
- List of railway lines in China
