= China Railway Xi'an Group =

China Railway Xi'an Group Co., Ltd.
- Company type: state-owned enterprise
- Industry: Railway operations
- Predecessor: Xi'an Railway Administration
- Founded: 19 November 2017
- Headquarters: 33 Youyi E Road, Beilin, Xi'an, Shaanxi, China
- Area served: Shaanxi northeastern Sichuan
- Owner: Government of China
- Parent: China Railway
- Website: Official Weibo Website

China Railway Xi'an Group
- Simplified Chinese: 中国铁路西安局集团
- Traditional Chinese: 中國鐵路西安局集團
Transcriptions
Standard Mandarin
- Hanyu Pinyin: Zhōngguó Tiělù Xī'ān Jú Jítuán

Xi'an Railway Administration
- Simplified Chinese: 西安铁路局
- Traditional Chinese: 西安鐵路局
Transcriptions
Standard Mandarin
- Hanyu Pinyin: Xī'ān Tiělù Jú

CR Xi'an
- Simplified Chinese: 西铁
- Traditional Chinese: 西鐵
Transcriptions
Standard Mandarin
- Hanyu Pinyin: Xītiě

China Railway Xi'an Group, officially abbreviated as CR Xi'an or CR-Xi'an, formerly, Xi'an Railway Administration is a subsidiary company under the jurisdiction of China Railway (formerly the Ministry of Railways). The company was founded in 2005 as a bureau and incorporated as a company in 2017.

It supervises the railway network within Shaanxi and northeastern parts of Sichuan.

== Hub stations ==
- Xi'an
  - Xi'an, Xi'an West, Xi'an North, Xinfengzhen
- Baoji
  - Baoji
- Ankang
  - Ankang
