= Wugong railway station =

Railway station in Shaanxi, China

Wugong 武功
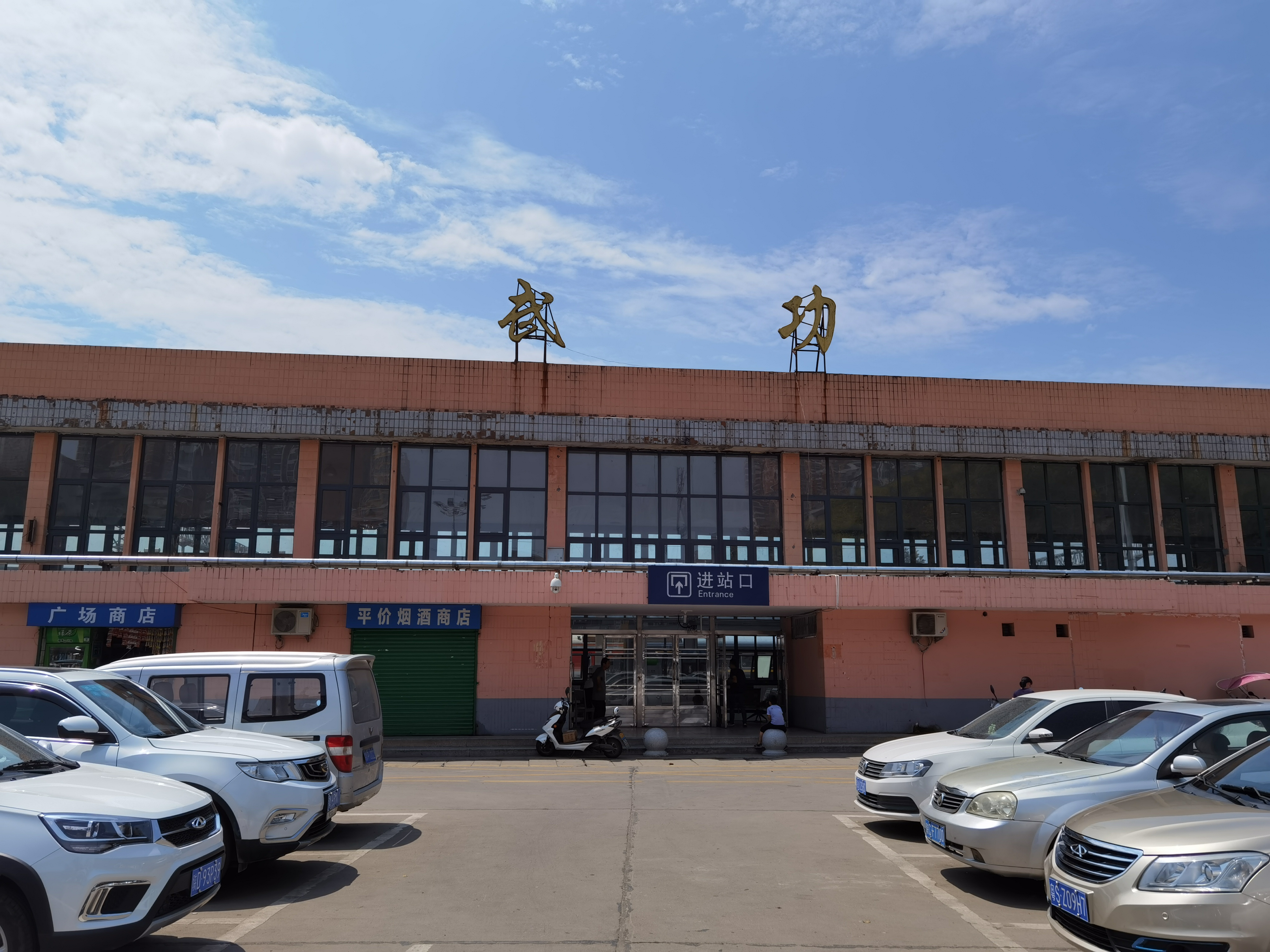
- Entrance to Wugong railway station

General information
- Location: Middle section of Renmin Road; Wugong County, Xianyang, Shaanxi; China
- Coordinates: 34.2594°N 108.2004°E
- Operator: CR Xi'an
- Line: Longhai Railway

Other information
- Station code: 39530 (TMIS code); WGY (telegraph code); WGO (Pinyin code)
- Classification: Class 3 station (三等站)

History
- Opened: 1936
- Former names: Pujizhen (Chinese: 普集镇)

Services
Preceding station	China Railway	Following station
Xingping towards Lianyungang East	Longhai railway	Yangling towards Lanzhou
Location
- Location within China

Wugong railway station (Chinese: 武功站) is a station on the Longhai railway in Wugong County, Xianyang, Shaanxi.

== History ==
The station was opened in 1936.

Formerly known as Pujizhen railway station (Chinese: 普集镇车站), the station was renamed to its current name in 1982. At the same time, the former Wugong railway station, which is 12 kilometres (7.5 mi) west, was renamed to Yanglingzhen railway station (its current name is Yangling railway station).
