= Chinese pyramids =

Mostly ancient mausoleums and burial mounds

Aerial view of Yanling, mausoleum of Emperor Cheng of Han, located outside of Xi'an

Chinese pyramids are pyramidal-shaped burial mounds built as mausoleums for the early emperors of China and their imperial relatives. About 38 of them are located around 25 kilometres (16 mi) – 35 kilometres (22 mi) north-west of Xi'an, on the Guanzhong Plains in Shaanxi Province. The most famous is the Mausoleum of the First Qin Emperor, northeast of Xi'an and 1.7 km west of where the Terracotta Army was found.

== Earliest tombs ==
The earliest tombs in China are found just north of Beijing in the Inner Mongolia Autonomous Region and in Liaoning. They belong to the Neolithic Hongshan culture (4700 to 2900 BC).

The site of Niuheliang in Liaoning contains a pyramidal structure.

== Information available in the West ==
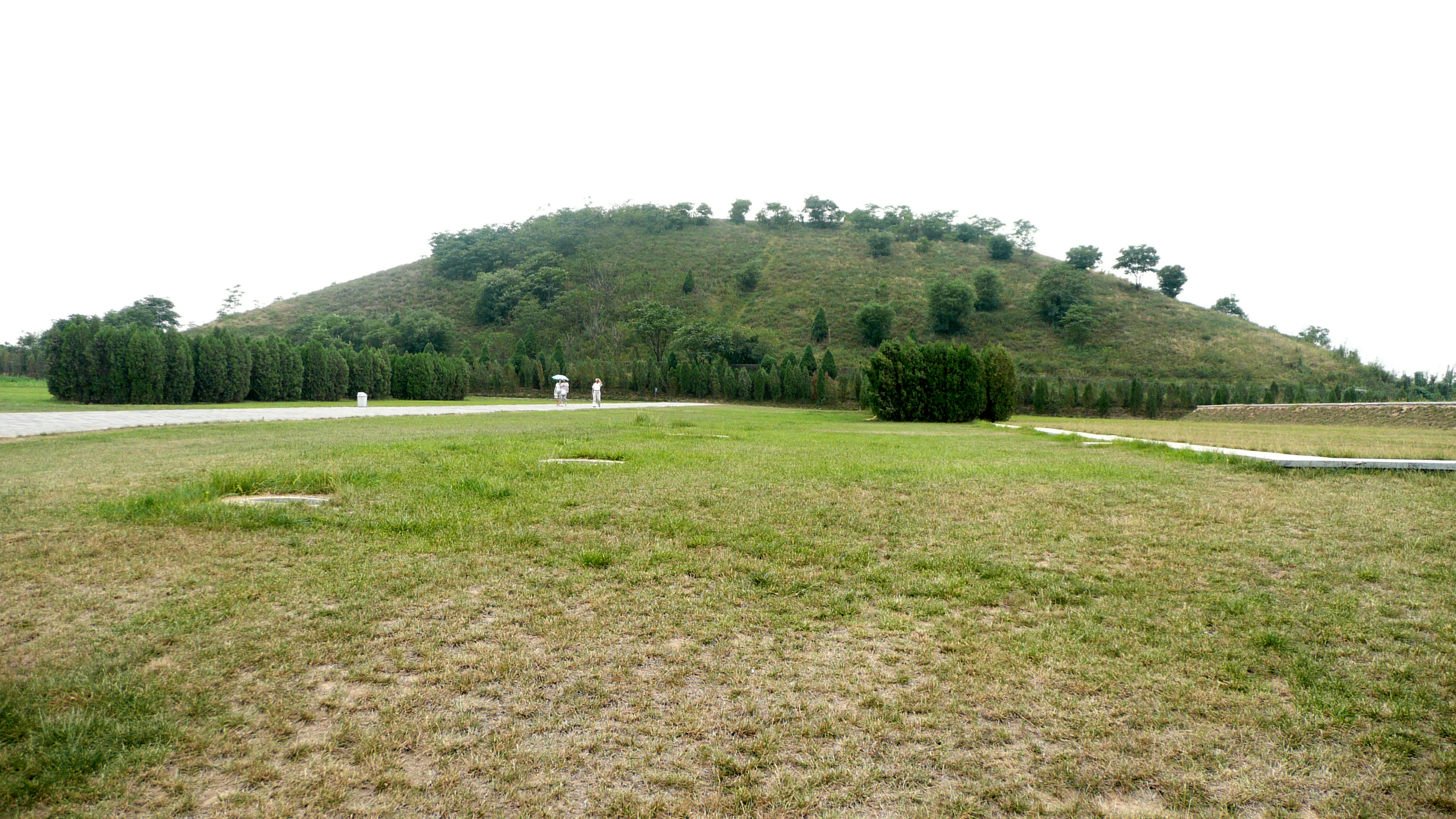
The tumulus mound of Yangling, the tomb of Emperor Jing of Han

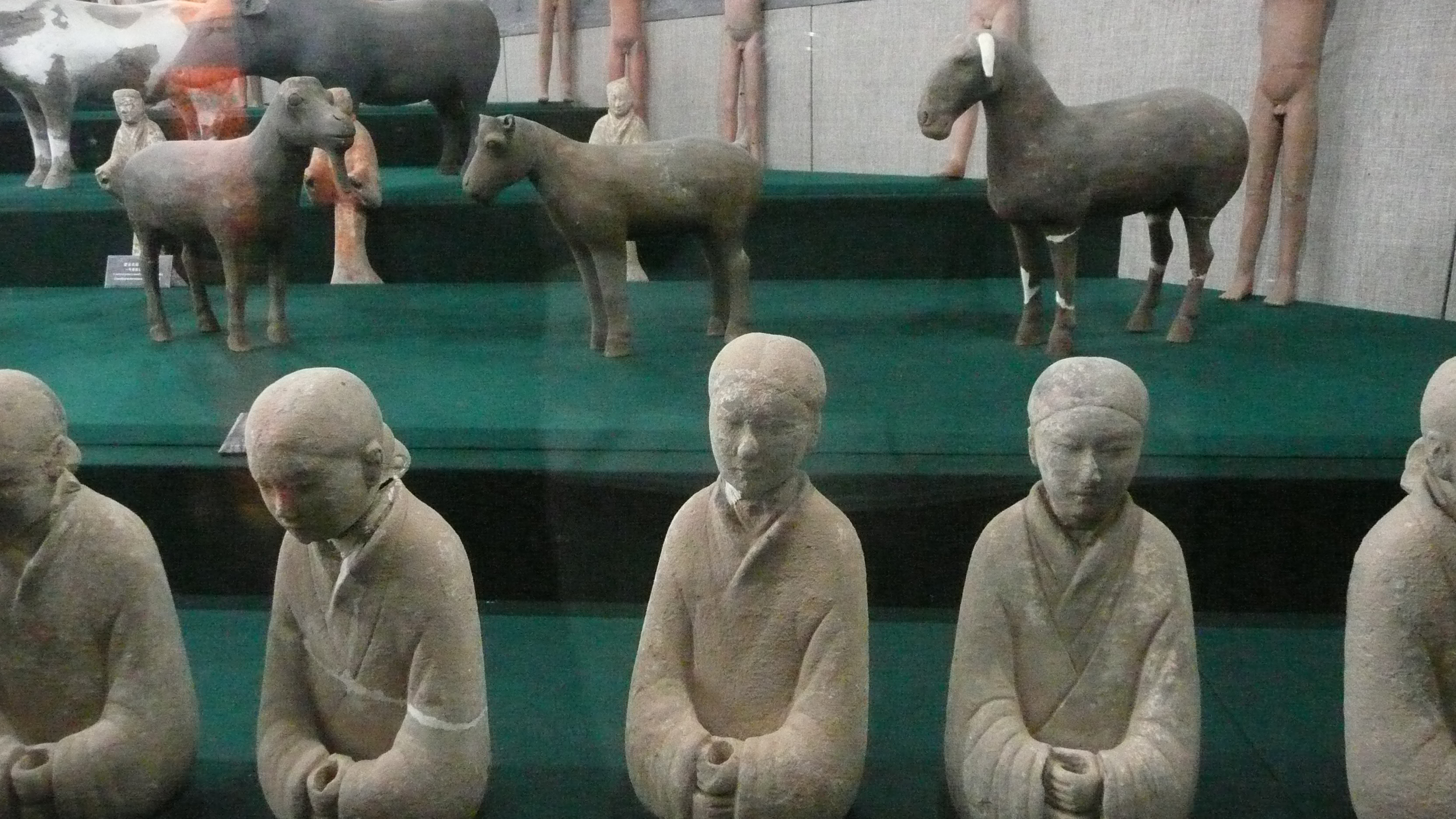
Pottery figurines of domesticated animals and female servants dressed in silk robes, excavated from the mausoleum of Emperor Jing of Han (r. 156–141 BC) near modern Xi'an (ancient Chang'an)

In 1667 the Jesuit Father Athanasius Kircher wrote about Chinese pyramids in his book China monumentis Illustrata.

The existence of "pyramids" in China remained little known in the Western world until the 1910s. They were documented in large numbers around Xian, first in 1912 by the Western traders Fred Meyer Schroder and Oscar Mamen, and also in 1913 by the expedition of Victor Segalen. He wrote about the First Emperor's tomb, and about the other mound tombs in the region in his Mission archéologique en Chine (1914): L'art funéraire à l'époque des Han.

=== Sensational claims ===
The introduction of pyramids in China to popular attention came soon after World War II. Many early stories were focused on the existence of a "Great White Pyramid" (Maoling). This is the tomb of Emperor Wu of Han (156–87 BC) located in Xingping, Shaanxi Province.

U.S. Army Air Corps pilot James Gaussman is said to have seen a white jewel-topped pyramid during a flight between India and China during World War II. Colonel Maurice Sheahan, Far Eastern director of the Trans World Airline, gave an eyewitness account of his encounter with a pyramid in the March 28, 1947 edition of The New York Times. A photo of Sheahan's pyramid appeared in The New York Sunday News on March 30, 1947. This photograph later became attributed to James Gaussman.

Western pseudohistorians and fantasy authors speculated they were built by aliens. and, through promoting their theories, have increased western awareness of these pyramids.

Despite claims to the contrary, the existence of these pyramid-shaped tomb mounds was known by scientists in the West before the publicity caused by the story in 1947. Shortly after the New York Times story, Science News Letter (now Science News) published a short item saying: "The Chinese pyramids of that region are built of mud and dirt and are more like mounds than the pyramids of Egypt, and the region is little travelled. American scientists who have been in the area suggest that the height of 1,000 feet (300 m), more than twice as high as any of the Egyptian pyramids, may have been exaggerated, because most of the Chinese mounds of that area are built relatively low. The location, reported 40 miles (64 km) southwest of Sian, is in an area of great archaeological importance, but few of the pyramids have ever been explored."

Some of the pyramids of Xi'an are currently tourist attractions, such as for example the Han Yang Ling Mausoleum of the Western Han dynasty, and several of them have museums attached to them.

== Partial list of mausoleums and tombs in China ==
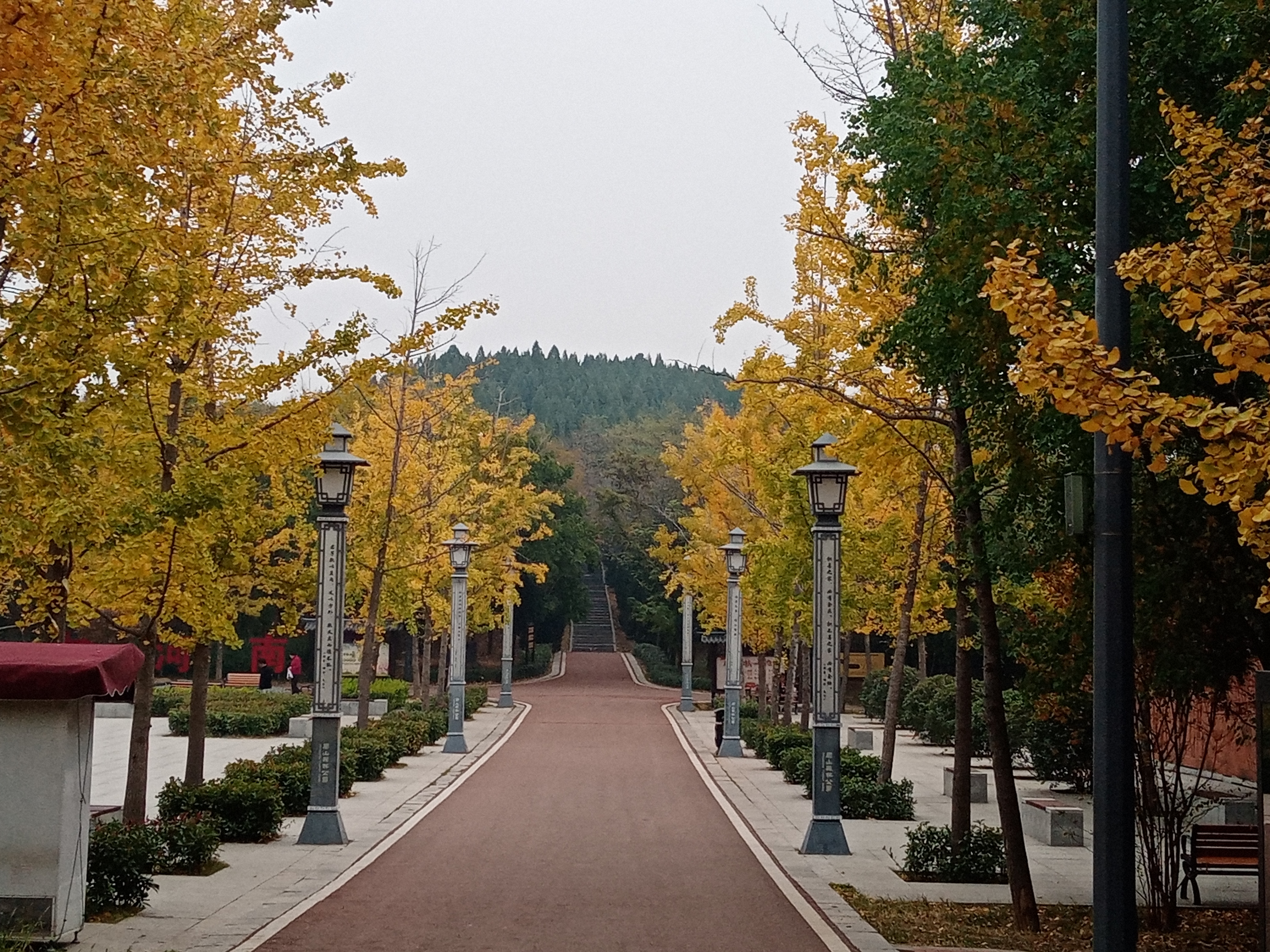
The tumulus of Zhousanling in Luoyang, traditionally believed to be the tombs of the kings of the Eastern Zhou dynasty

=== Zhou dynasty tombs complex near Luoyang, Henan ===
- Tomb of King Ling of Zhou 34.6250°N 112.3753°E
- Tomb of Three Kings of Zhou 34.6280°N 112.3829°E

=== Zhao Kings' tombs complex near Handan, Hebei ===
- Tomb of King of Zhao state 36.7067°N 114.4189°E

=== Yan King's burial mounds in Yixian, Hebei ===
- Burial complex in ancient Xiadu 39.3049°N 115.5407°E

=== Qin dynasty mausoleums near Xi'an, Shaanxi ===
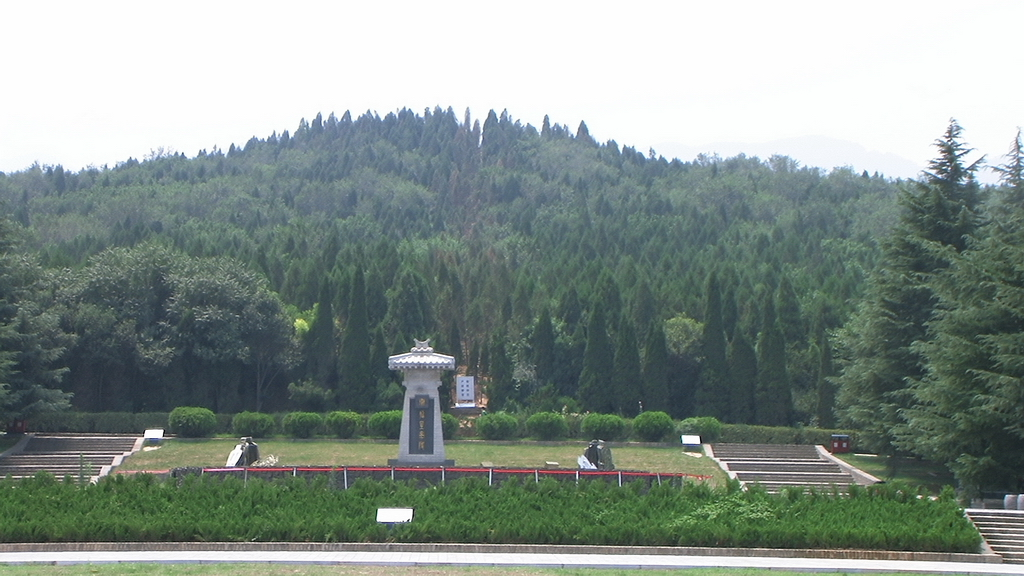
Tumulus of the Qin Shi Huang's Mausoleum

- The Mausoleum of Qin Shi Huang in Lintong 34.3812°N 109.2540°E .This is the largest Chinese burial mound. The original height was 76 metres (249 ft), the present height is 47 metres (154 ft), and the dimensions are 357 by 354 metres (1,171 ft × 1,161 ft). It was built during the short-lived imperial Qin dynasty (221–206 BCE).
- Tomb of Emperor Qin Ershi in Xi'an.

=== Western Han dynasty mausoleums complex in Xianyang and around Xi'an, Shaanxi ===
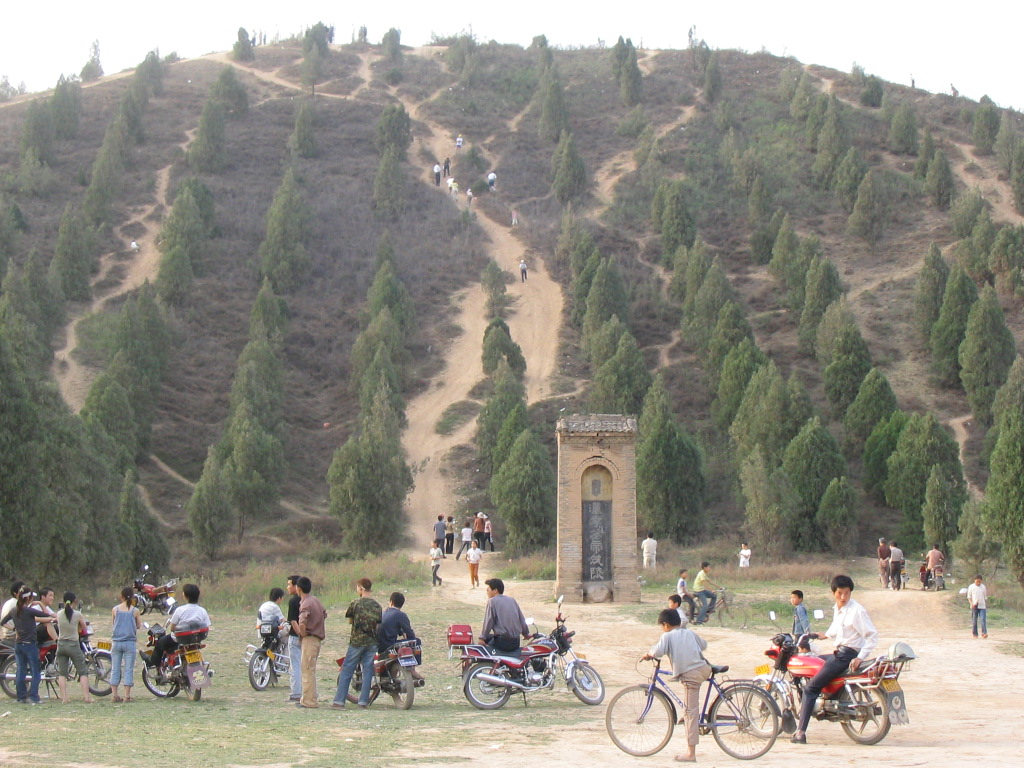
Tumulus of the Maoling Mausoleum of Emperor Wu of Han

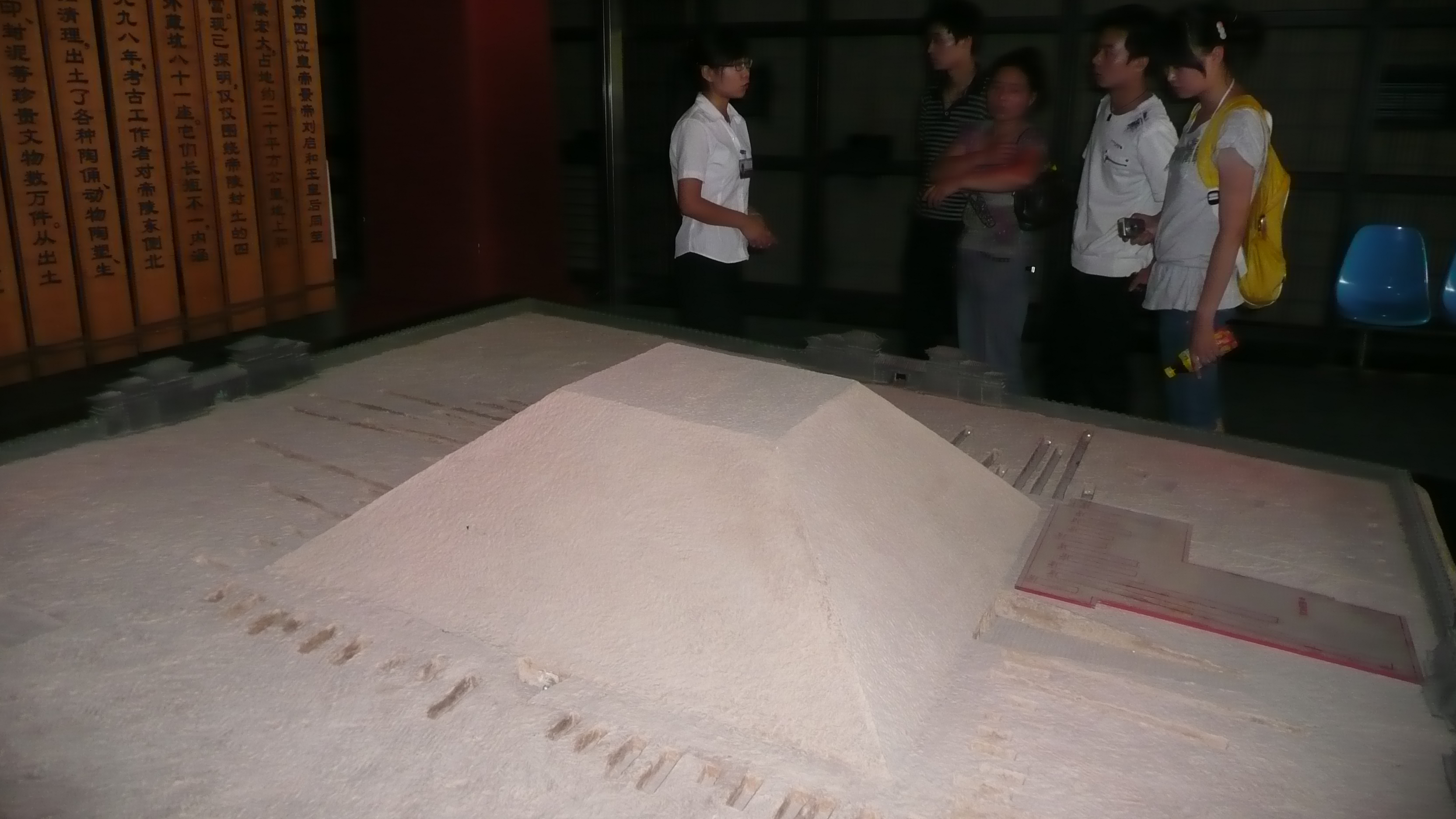
A modern model portraying how Emperor Jing's tomb complex would have appeared upon completion

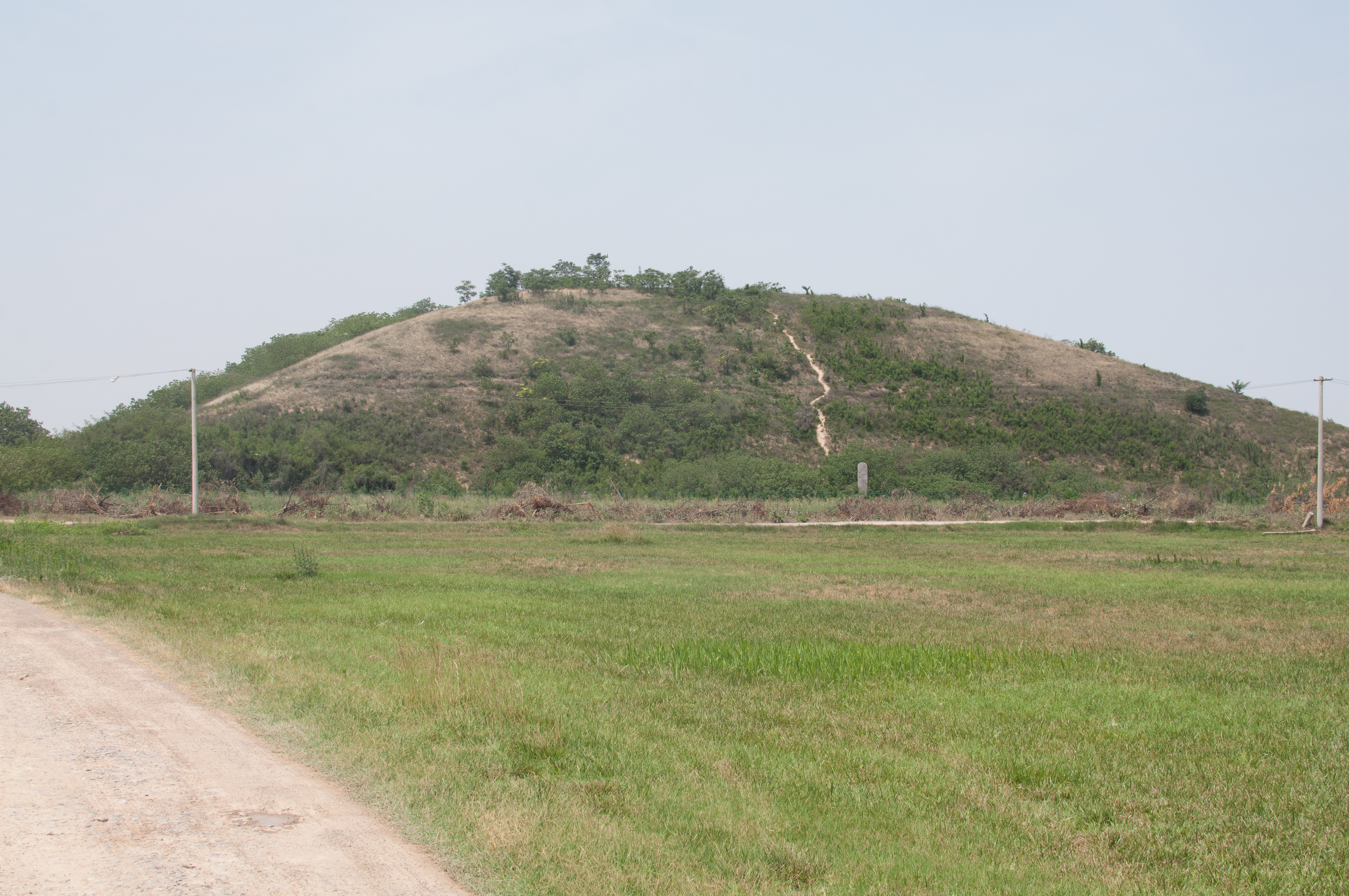
Tomb mound of Empress Wang of Emperor Jing

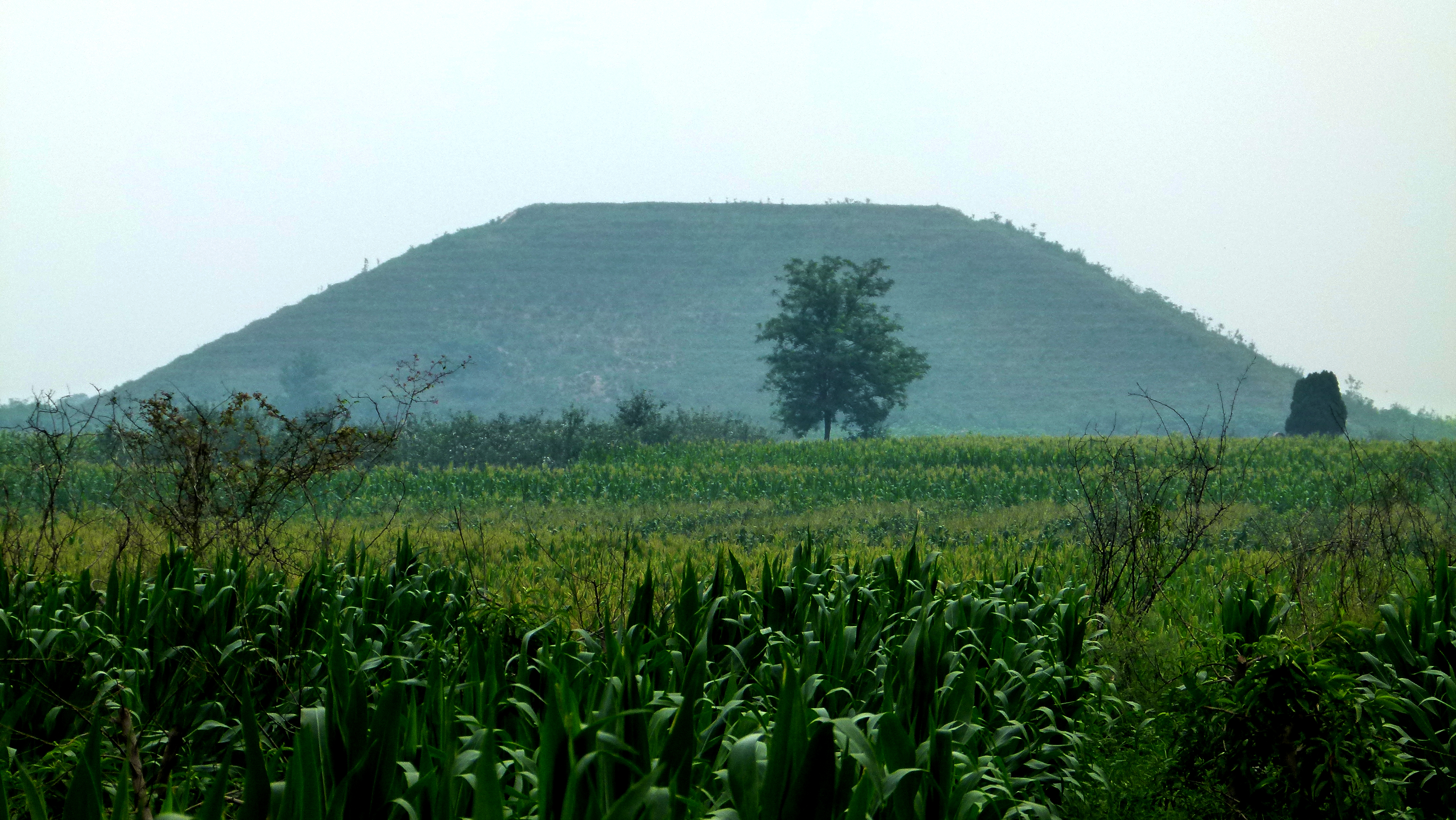
Pingling mound of Emperor Zhao of Han

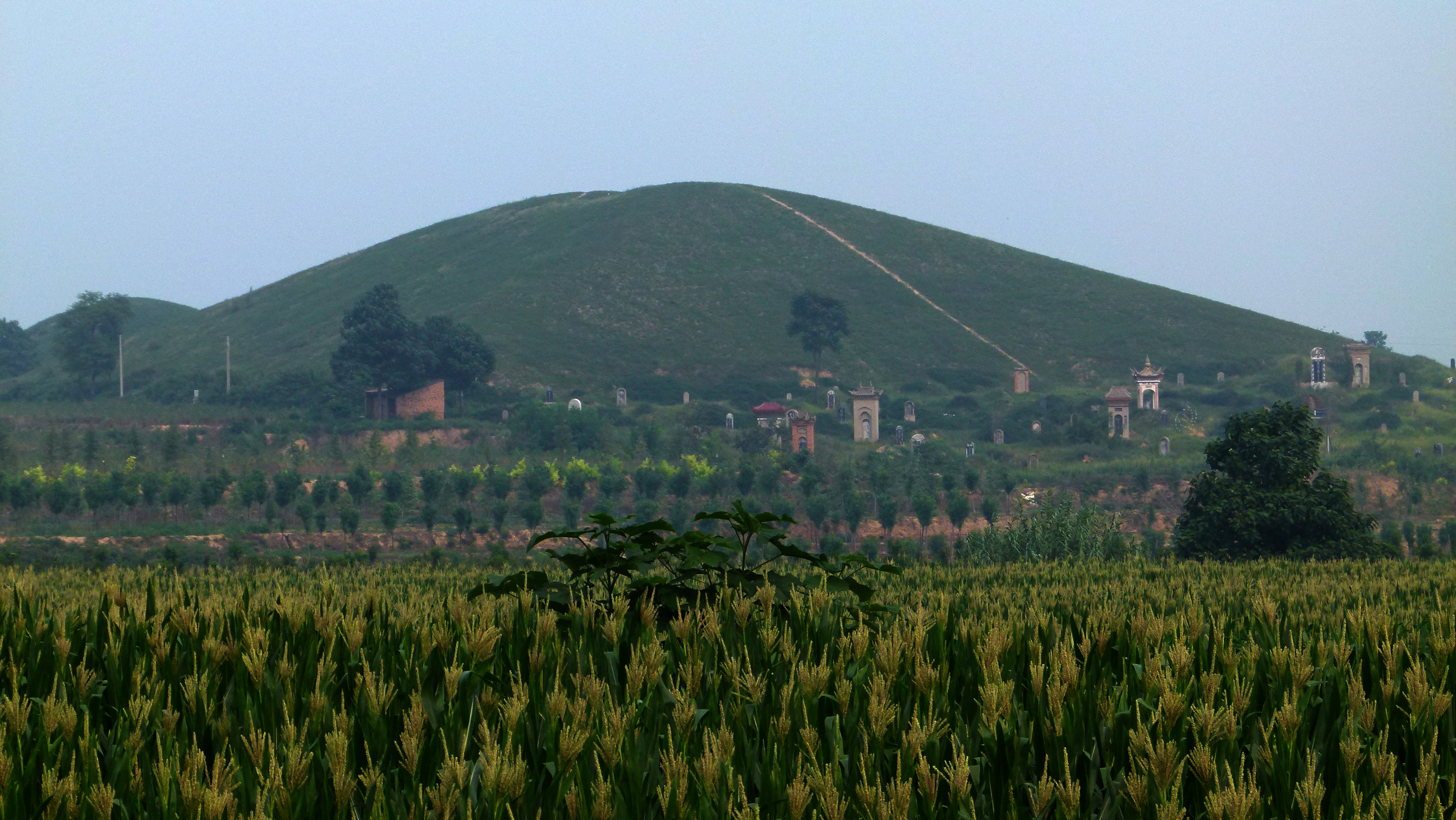
Anling mound of Emperor Hui of Han

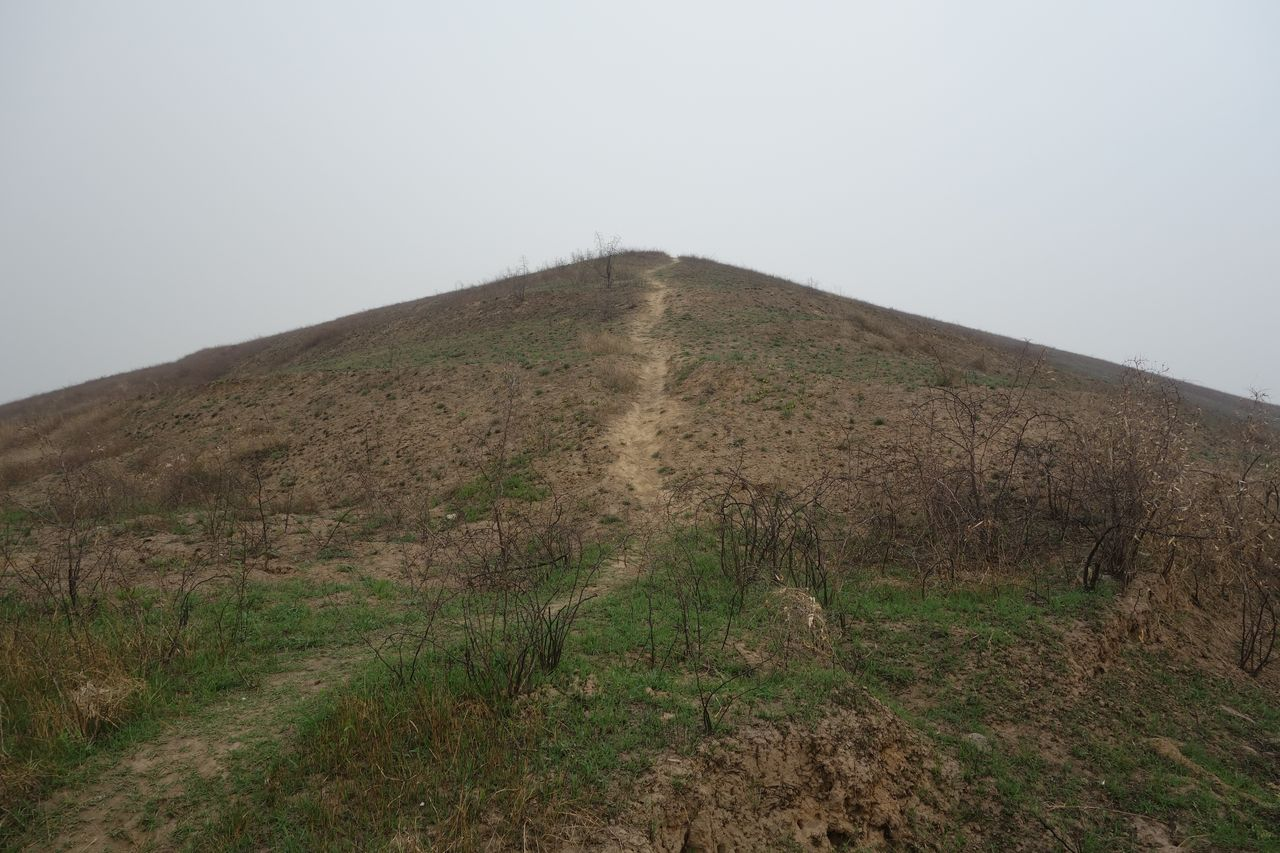
Mound of Changling mausoleum

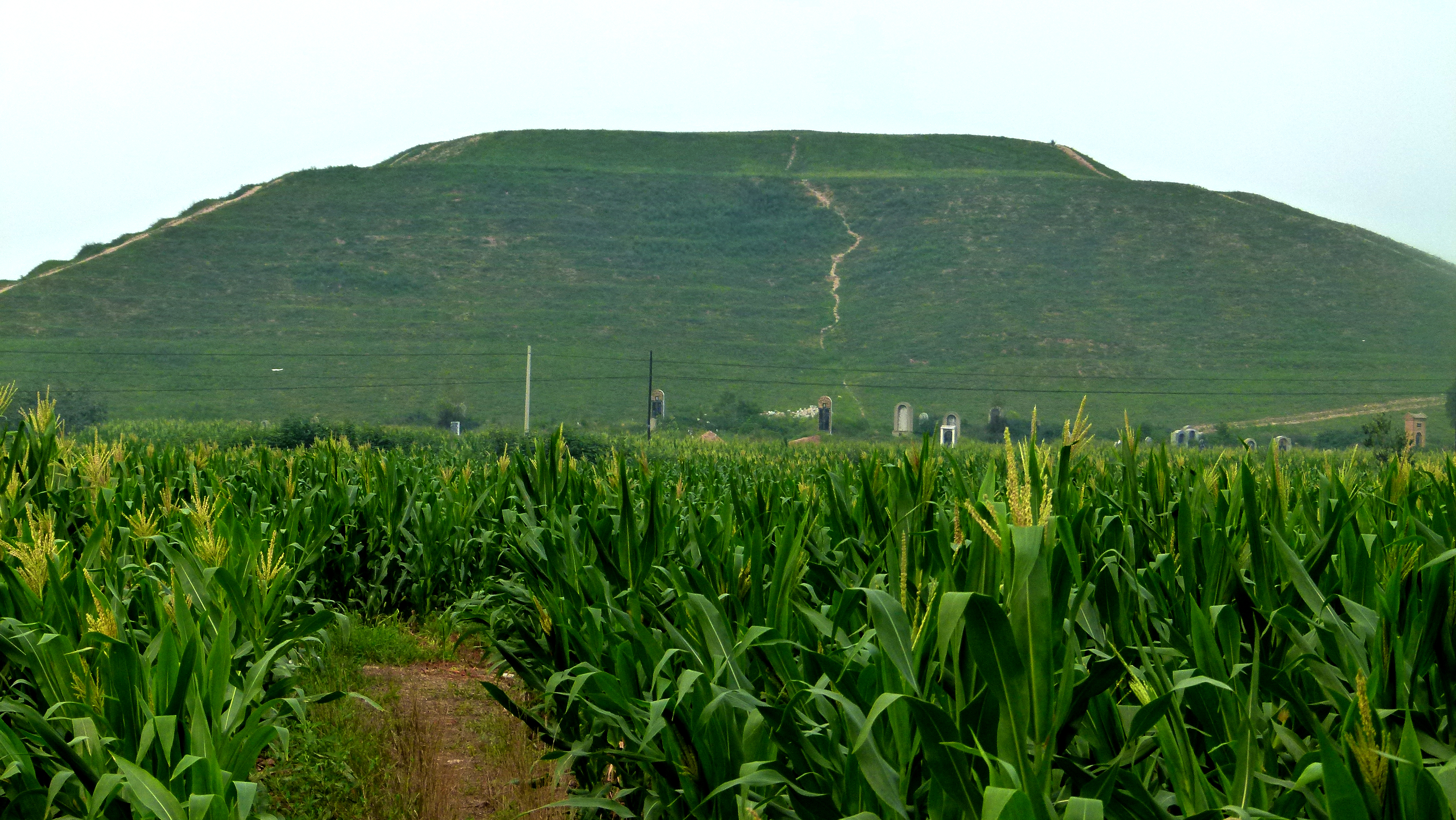
Mound of Kangling, mausoleum of Emperor Ping of Han

Maoling Mausoleum group:

- Tomb of Emperor Wu of Han 34.3381°N 108.5697°E. The size is 222 metres (728 ft) x 217 metres (712 ft).
- Tomb of Empress Li 34.3403°N 108.5620°E
- Tomb of Princess Yang Xin

Pingling Mausoleum group:

- Tomb of Emperor Zhao of Han 34.3618°N 108.6401°E
- Tomb of Empress Shangguan 34.3631°N 108.6305°E

Yanling Mausoleum group:

- Tomb of Emperor Cheng of Han 34.3749°N 108.6980°E
- Tomb of Empress Xu 34.3746°N 108.6847°E
- Tomb of Consort Ban 34.3798°N 108.7045°E
- Tomb of Empress Zhao Feiyan

Kangling Mausoleum group:

- Tomb of Emperor Ping of Han 34.3978°N 108.7124°E
- Tomb of Empress Wang

Weiling Mausoleum group:

- Tomb of Emperor Yuan of Han 34.3903°N 108.7391°E
- Tomb of Empress Wang 34.3932°N 108.7338°E

Group of two "tombs of Zhou Kings" (possibly from Han era):

- Tomb of King Wu of Zhou
- Tomb of King Wen of Zhou

Yiling mausoleum group:

- Tomb of Emperor Ai of Han 34.4009°N 108.7646°E
- Tomb of Empress Fu 34.4026°N 108.7725°E

Anling mausoleum group:

- Tomb of Emperor Hui of Han 34.4229°N 108.8413°E
- Tomb of Empress Zhang Yan 34.4232°N 108.8370°E
- Tomb of Marquis Zhang Ao (father of Empress Zhang Yan) 34.4277°N 108.8512°E
- Tomb of Princess Yuan of Lu (mother of Empress Zhang Yan)

Changling mausoleum group:

- Tomb of Emperor Gaozu of Han 34.4347°N 108.8766°E
- Tomb of Empress Lü 34.4338°N 108.8813°E
- Tomb of Consort Qi

Yangling mausoleum group:

- Tomb of Emperor Jing of Han 34.4438°N 108.9408°E
- Tomb of Empress Wang 34.4463°N 108.9475°E

Baling mausoleum group:

- Tomb of Emperor Wen of Han (The tomb of the Emperor himself does not feature a pyramidal mound, due to his death wish)
- Tomb of Empress Dou 34.2358°N 109.1186°E
- Tomb of Empress Dowager Bo 34.2210°N 109.0963°E

Duling mausoleum group:

- Tomb of Emperor Xuan of Han 34.1811°N 109.0223°E
- Tomb of Empress Wang 34.1790°N 109.0284°E
- Tomb of Empress Xu 34.1273°N 109.0558°E

=== Yangling, Shaanxi ===
- Tomb of Emperor Wen of Sui 34.2880°N 108.0229°E

=== Xining, Qinghai ===
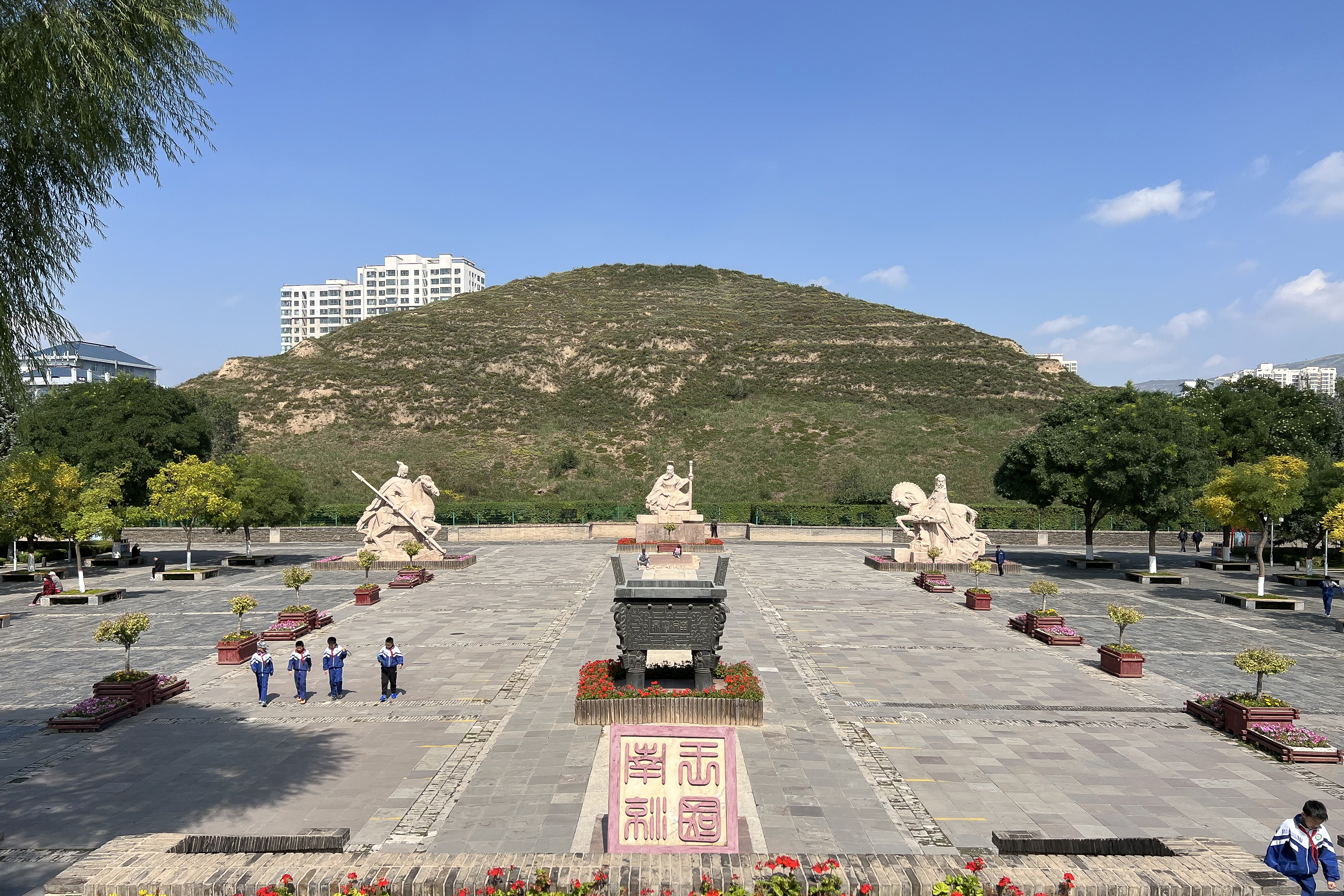
The Hutai Pyramid in Xining

- The Hutai Altar of Southern Liang (凉虎台) 36.6329°N 101.7461°E

=== Tang dynasty mausoleums in Shaanxi ===
The eighteen mausoleums of the Tang dynasty emperors (唐十八陵) in the valley of the Wei River north of the Qin Mountains (秦岭). Most are natural hills shaped by man, and they are among the biggest Chinese mausoleums, such as Qianling (乾陵), joint tomb of Emperor Gaozong of Tang and of the Empress Wu Zetian. Some mausoleums feature a burial mound:

- Chongling Mausoleum of Emperor Dezong of Tang34.7074°N 108.8285°E
- Jinling Mausoleum of Emperor Xianzong of Tang34.5710°N 108.2659°E
- Tomb of Princess Chengyang of Emperor Taizong 34.6156°N 108.4931°E
- Tomb of Princess Xincheng of Emperor Taizong 34.6237°N 108.4989°E

=== Mausoleum of Emperor Xiaojing of Tang near Goushi, Henan ===
- Tomb of Emperor Xiaojing of Tang 34.6328°N 112.8111°E
- Tomb of Empress Ai

=== Elsewhere ===
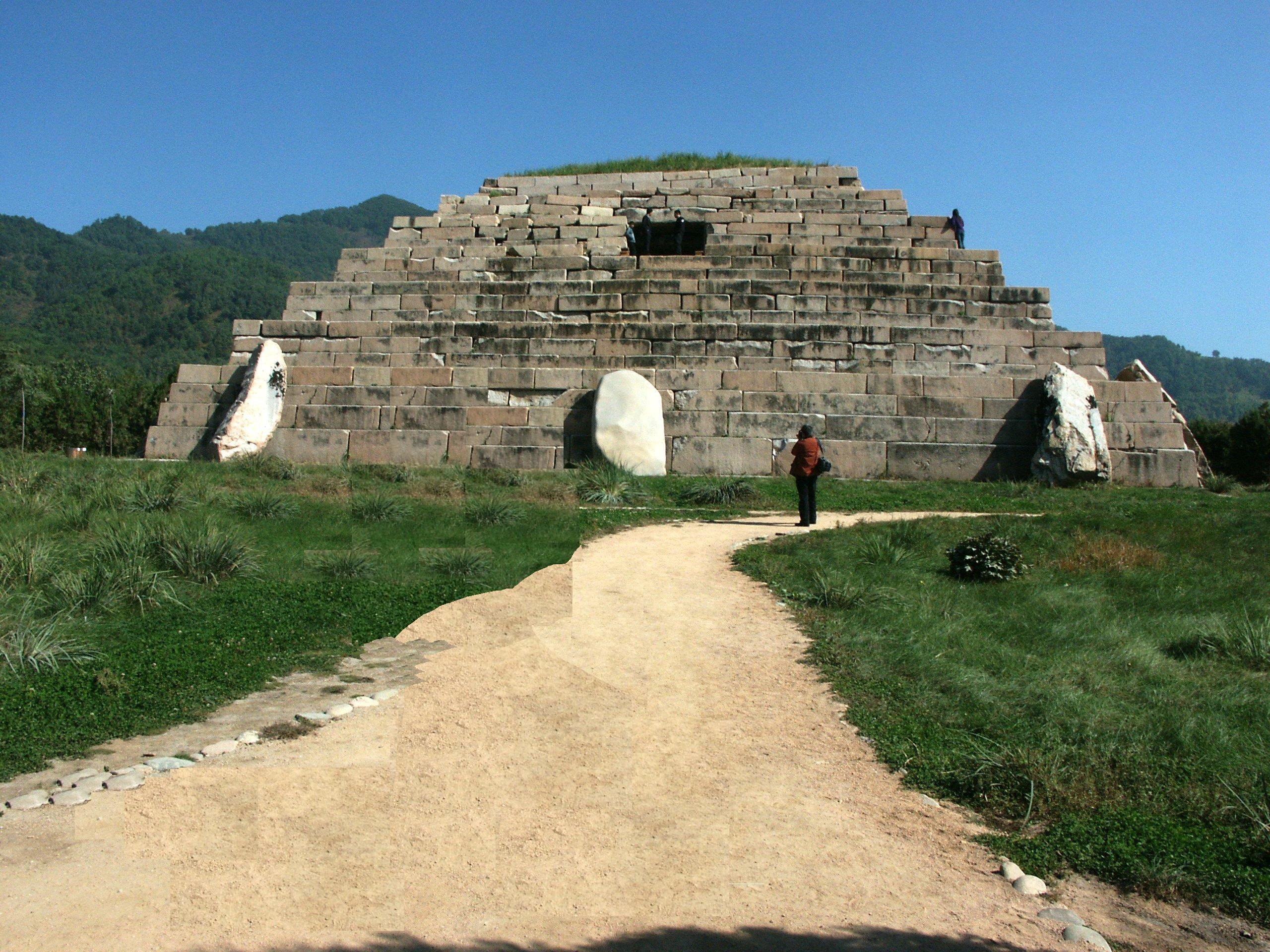
The 'Tomb of the General' in Ji'an, Jilin, China. It was built during the Goguryeo Kingdom (37 BC – 668 AD)

- Shou Qiu in Qufu, Shandong – a small pyramidal monument believed to be the birthplace of the Yellow Emperor, located adjacent to the Shaohao Tomb
- Janggun-chong (Jiangjunzhong 將軍塚) Step Pyramid in Jilin, "Tomb of the General", is supposed to be the mausoleum of King Jangsu (Ko. 장수왕 Ch. 長壽王) (413–491), king of Goguryeo, an ancient Korean kingdom. It belongs to the Capital Cities and Tombs of the Ancient Koguryo Kingdom on the World heritage list. Nearby is the Taewang-neung / Taiwangling (태왕릉, 太王陵) Pyramid believed to be the burial of King Gwanggaeto the Great (Ko. 광개토태왕; Ch. 廣開土太王) (391–413); while twice bigger than Janggun-chong, it is in bad shape and Janggun-chong is touted as the touristic highpoint of the site.
- Shimao a Neolithic site in Shenmu County, Shaanxi with a large stepped pyramid with palaces at its top and used also for artisan or industrial work
- The Western Xia tombs of the Tangut Empire near Yinchuan in Ningxia Hui Autonomous Region, northwestern China, a large number of tombs covering some 50 km^{2} (19 sq mi) are referred to as 'Chinese Pyramids'.

== See also ==
- Chinese architecture
