= Xingping railway station =

Railway station in Xianyang, China

Xingping 兴平
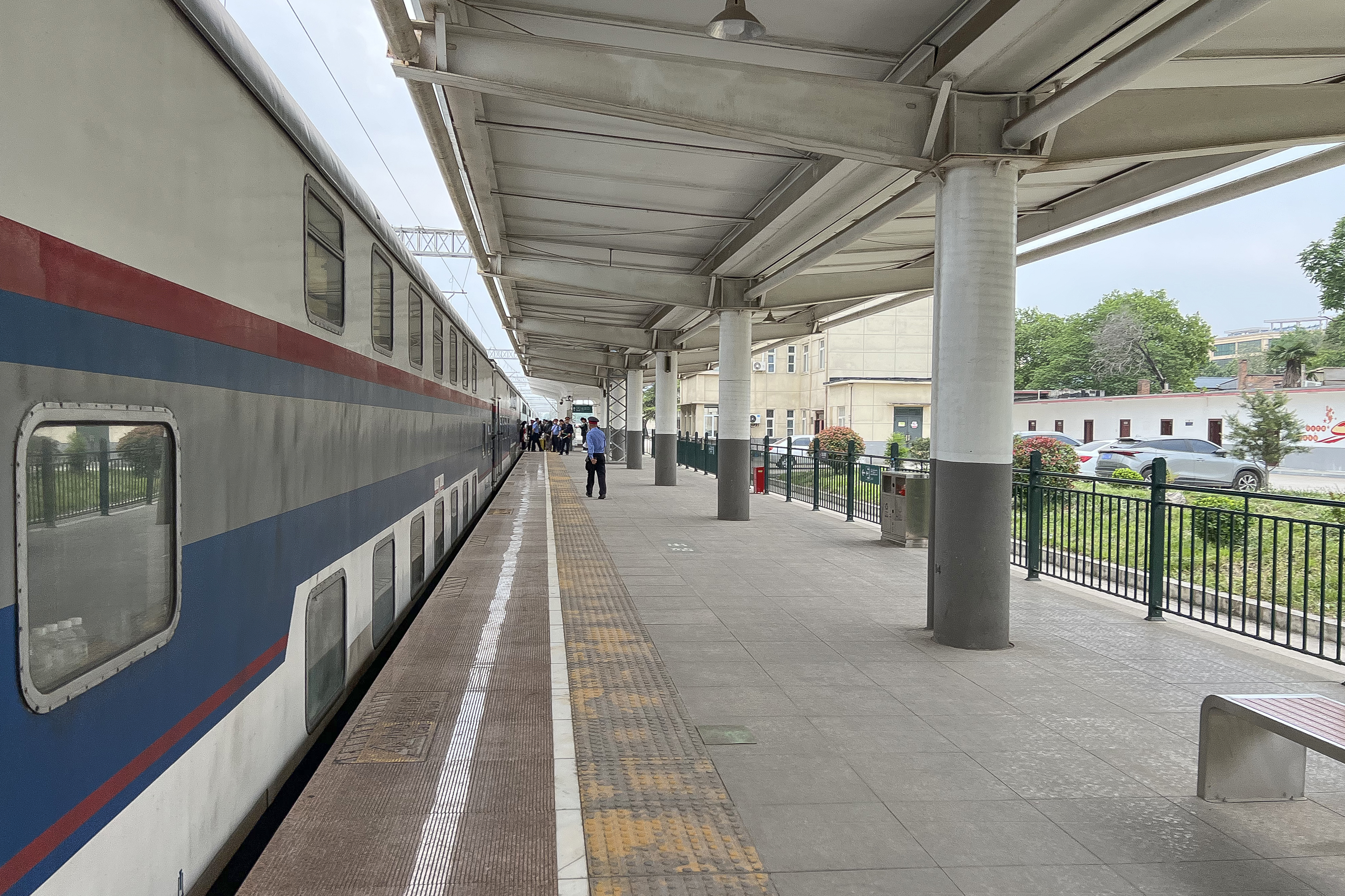

General information
- Location: Xingping, Xianyang, Shaanxi; China
- Coordinates: 34.2898°N 108.4842°E
- Operator: CR Xi'an
- Line: Longhai Railway

Other information
- Station code: 39521 (TMIS code); XPY (telegraph code); XPI (Pinyin code)
- Classification: Class 3 station (三等站)

History
- Opened: 1936

Services
Preceding station	China Railway	Following station
Xianyang towards Lianyungang East	Longhai railway	Wugong towards Lanzhou
Location
- Location within China

Xingping railway station (simplified Chinese: 兴平站; traditional Chinese: 興平站; pinyin: Xīngpíng Zhàn) is a station on Longhai railway in Xingping, Xianyang, Shaanxi.

== History ==
The station was opened in 1936.
