= Guozhen railway station =

Railway station in Baoji, China

Guozhen 虢镇
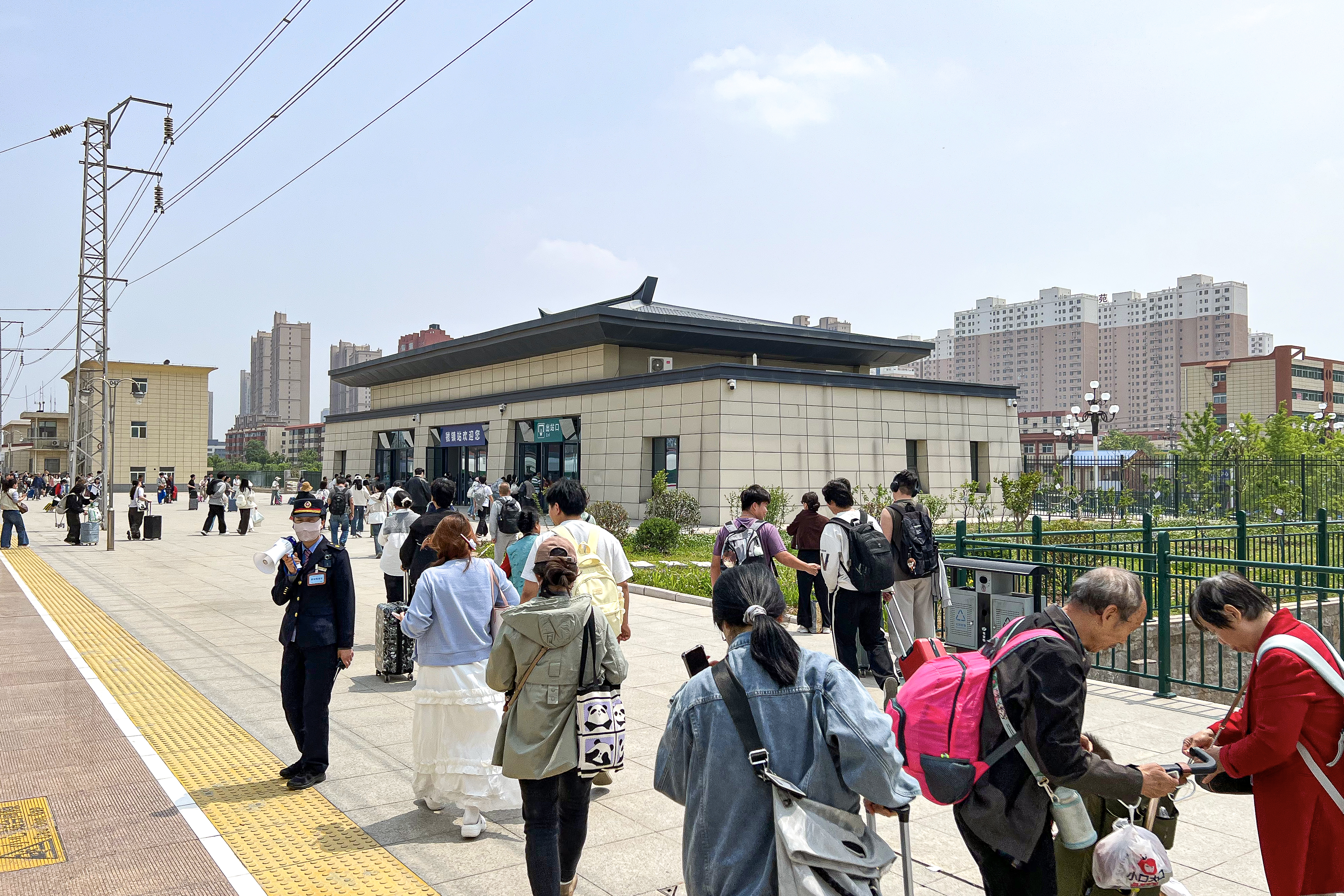
- Station building

General information
- Location: Heping Street; Chencang District, Baoji, Shaanxi; China
- Coordinates: 34.3645°N 107.3586°E
- Operator: CR Xi'an
- Line: Longhai Railway
- Platforms: 3 (1 side platform and 1 island platform)

Other information
- Station code: 39572 (TMIS code); GZY (telegraph code); GZH (Pinyin code)
- Classification: Class 3 station (三等站)

History
- Opened: 1936

Services
Preceding station	China Railway	Following station
Caijiapo towards Lianyungang East	Longhai railway	Baoji towards Lanzhou
Location
- Location within China

Guozhen railway station (Chinese: 虢镇站) is a station on Longhai railway in Chencang District, Baoji, Shaanxi.

== History ==
The station was opened in 1936.

Passenger services at this station used to be suspended, and was resumed on 1 April 2016. It was announced the station would be renamed as Chencang railway station (Chinese: 陈仓站), but the name remains unchanged as of September 2018.
