= Yangling railway station =

Railway station in Xianyang, China

Yangling 杨陵
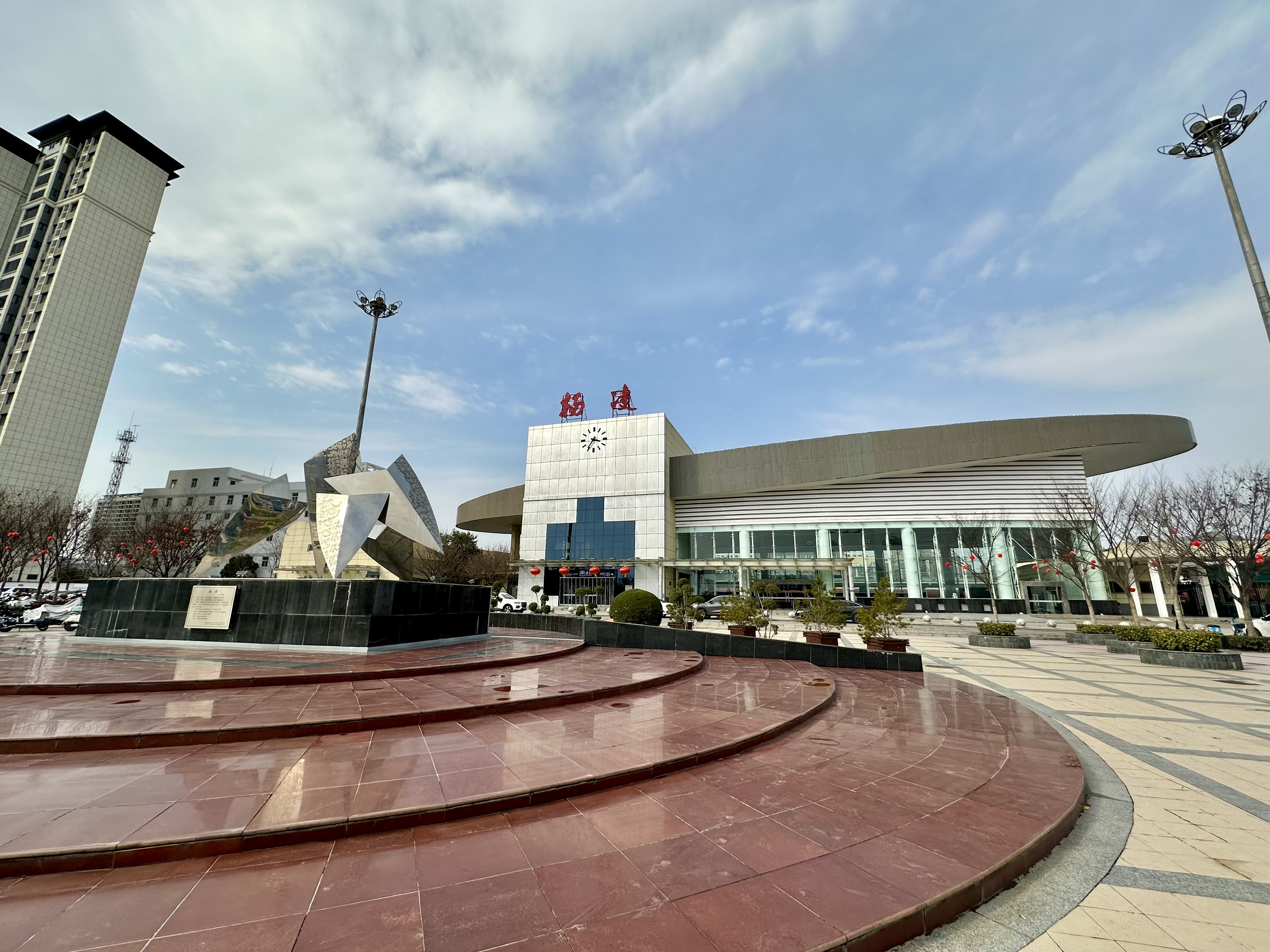

General information
- Location: Middle section of Huiwei Road; Yangling District, Xianyang, Shaanxi; China
- Coordinates: 34.2703°N 108.0739°E
- Operator: CR Xi'an
- Line: Longhai railway

Other information
- Station code: 39542 (TMIS code); YSY (telegraph code); YLI (Pinyin code)
- Classification: Class 3 station (三等站)

History
- Opened: 1936
- Former names: Wugong (Chinese: 武功); Yanglingzhen (Chinese: 杨陵镇)

Services
Preceding station	China Railway	Following station
Jiangzhang towards Lianyungang East	Longhai railway	Caijiapo towards Lanzhou
Location
- Location within China

Yangling railway station (Chinese: 杨陵站) is a station on Longhai railway in Yangling District, Xianyang, Shaanxi.

== History ==
The station was opened in 1936 as Wugong railway station (Chinese: 武功车站).

In 1982, Yangling District was established and the name of the station was changed to Yanglingzhen railway station (Chinese: 杨陵镇车站) thereafter.

The station was renovated in 2006, and was renamed to the current name in 2014.
