= Han dynasty tomb architecture =

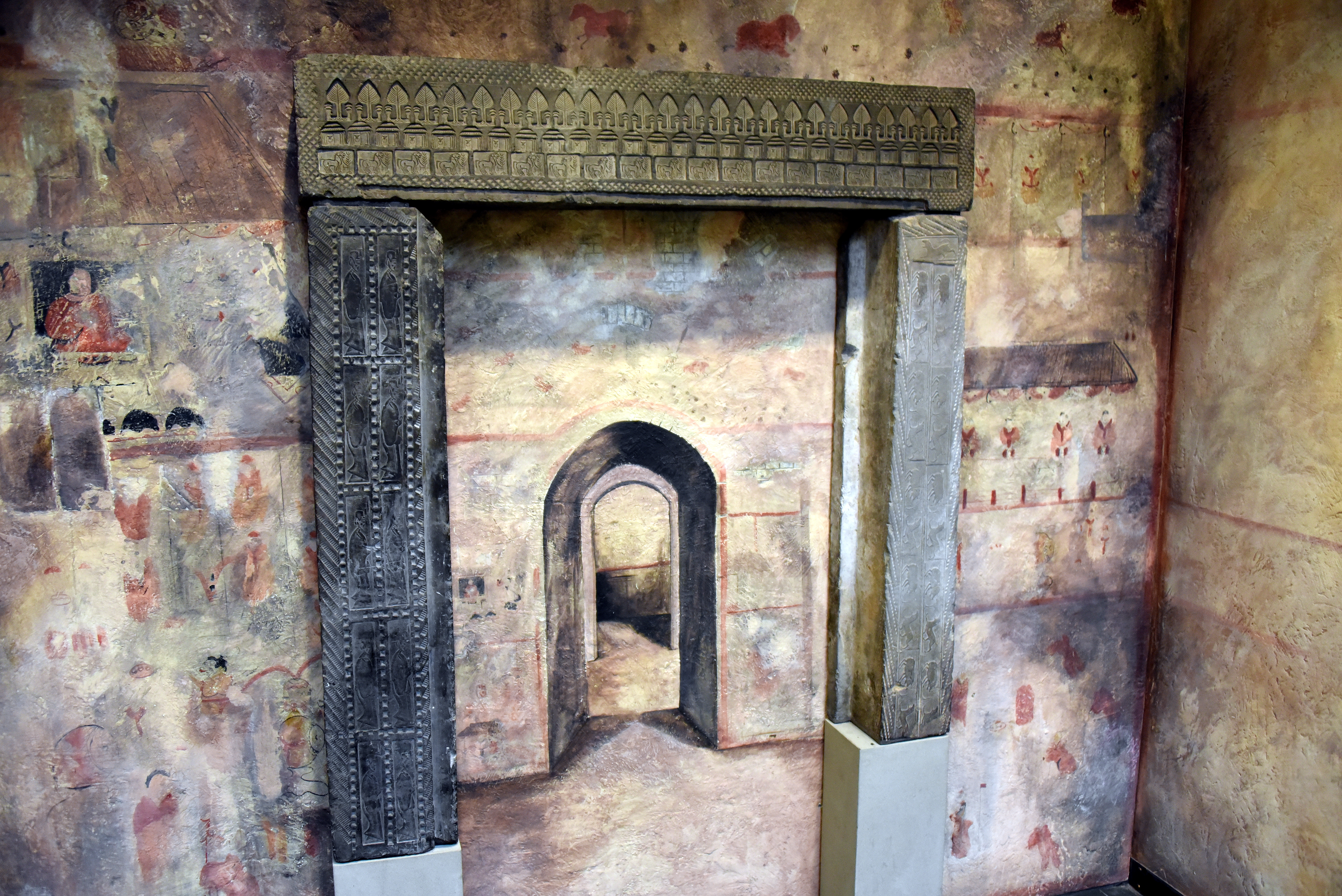
Bricks from tomb doorways. Clay. Han dynasty. Victoria and Albert Museum, London

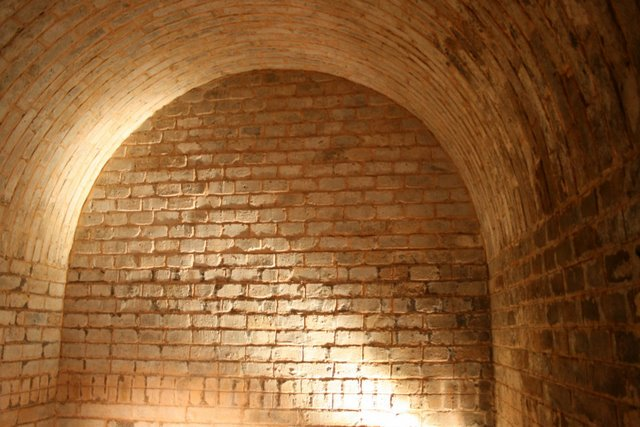
A Eastern Han dynasty (25–220 AD) vaulted tomb chamber in Luoyang.

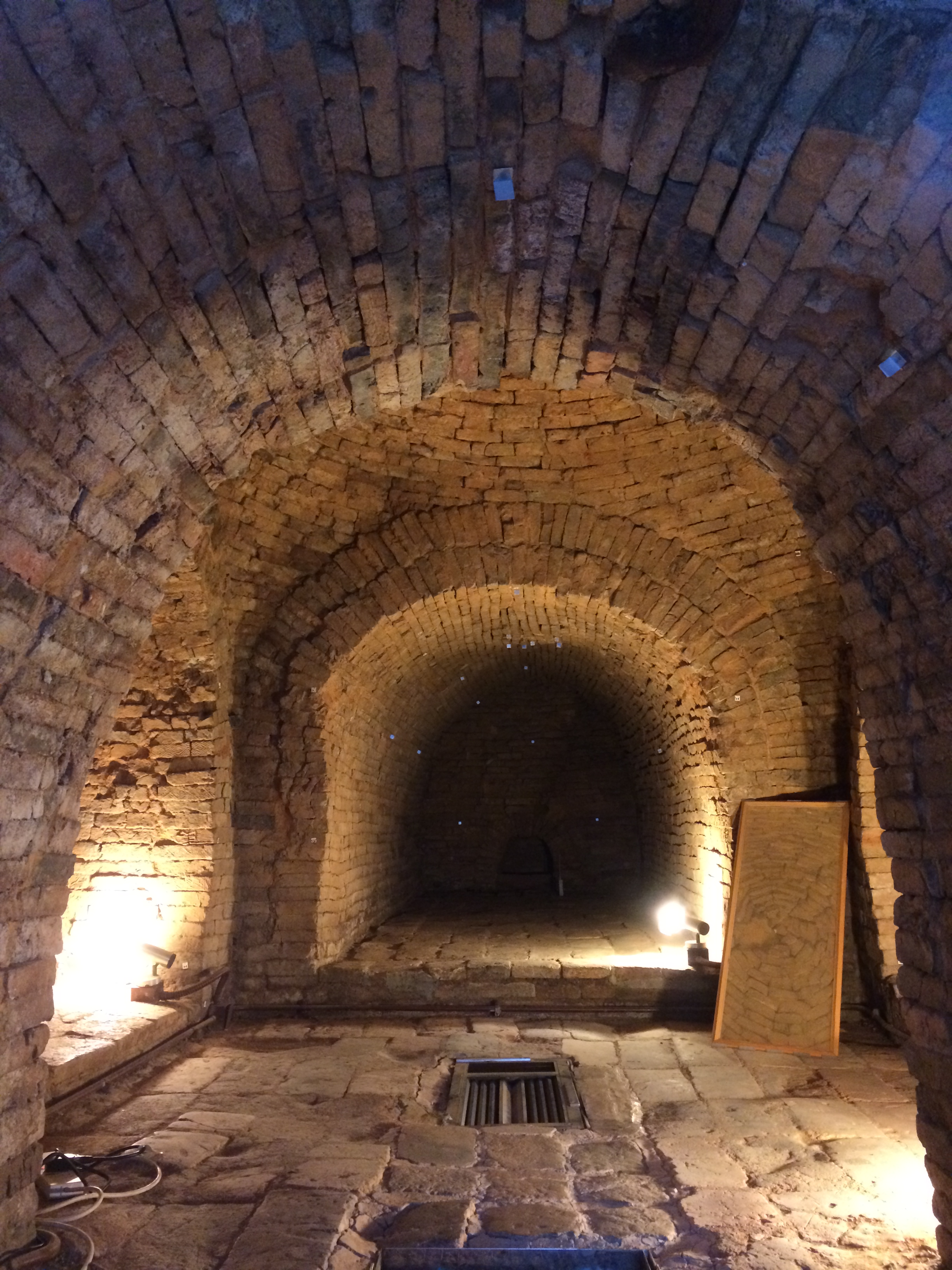
Inside the Lei Cheng Uk Han Tomb of Hong Kong, dated to the Eastern Han dynasty (25–220 AD).

Han dynasty tomb architecture, tombs to house the dead, underwent significant changes during the Han period (206 BCE to 220 CE).

Western Han imperial practice had been to offer sacrifice at the ancestral temple. The Lunheng, a text possibly completed between 70 and 80 CE, describes the practice of grave sacrifice. "According to the ancient rites, the sacrifices to the ascendants were performed in temples, the modern custom is to offer them at the grave."

Well-known examples of Western Han tombs have been scientifically excavated: Mawangdui and the tombs of Liu Sheng, Prince of Zhongshan and his wife, Dou Wan. The tomb at Mawangdui is a nested tomb. The paired tombs of Liu Sheng and his wife, Dou Wan are cave tombs.

During the Eastern Han, so-called underground palace tombs were introduced. Well-known examples of Eastern Han tombs have been scientifically excavated: Yi'nan, Dongjiazhuang and Dahuting. Couple burial emerged as the standard form of burial during the late Han period, along with the pairing of male/female motifs used in the decorative programs of the tombs. These paired motifs include Xiwangmu, the Queen Mother of the West, and her consort Dongwanggong, the King Father of the East, sun and moon, male and female phoenix and Fuxi and Nuwa, and entertainment.

Depictions of festivities and rites depicted in Eastern Han tombs are idealized with large numbers of guests. Carriage processions are a stock scene of Eastern Han tombs. These processions may depict scenes of official life, scenes of funeral procession and/or heavenly conveyances. The Eastern Han tombs of Yi'nan, Dahutung and Dongjiazhuang depict official life as the type of carriage in which a person was conveyed signaled the social status and official rank of the rider. During the Han period, a man of wealth was described as "having chariots and horses at the door." The Hou Han shu relates that at the death of Kong Guan there were so many officials in attendance that there were ten thousand carriages.

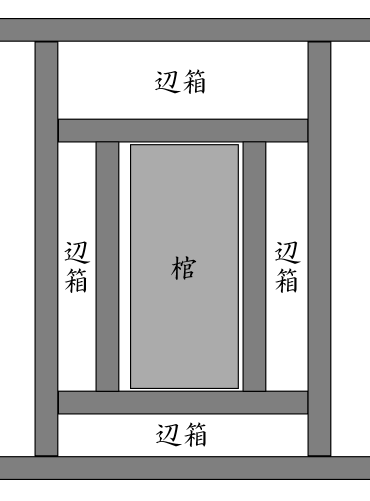
Mawangdui Tomb 1 guanguo rough top view

Sacrifice within the tomb was another innovation in mortuary ritual that occurred during the Eastern Han period. Emperor Ming (r. 58-78 C.E.) formally abolished the imperial temple sacrifice in 58 C.E., when he transferred the rites from the temple to the site of the imperial tomb. This act was officially recorded as being motivated solely by filial piety. Emperor Ming reported that after the death of his father, the Emperor Guangwu, he dreamt of his deceased parents the night before the imperial ancestral sacrifice. The next day, he led his ministers to the tomb of his parents and held the sacrifice there. Sweet dew is reported to have fallen from heaven, and Emperor Ming wept upon seeing the personal effects of his mother.

This mortuary ritual within the tomb may be tied to tomb doors, an architectural innovation that appeared at the same point in time. While a description of this change in mortuary ritual is found in the Hou Han shu, there are no extant texts describing the ritual performance itself. The Classic of Filial Piety, a brief text probably written in the early Han, discussed the five requirements for filial conduct, emphasizing the importance of mortuary ritual and sacrifice.

Victor Turner's mortuary ritual offers three phase of ritual performance: separation, limen and reintegration. By linking theories of ritual passage with the architecture of Eastern Han underground palace tombs, it is seen that the carved stone doors in Eastern Han tombs signaled that the tomb was a locus of transformation to an audience of the living and the dead. An analysis of the working stone doorways within Eastern Han tombs shows that death, a system-endangering event of central importance, was defeated by the correct program of mortuary ritual at the site of the doors and doorways within the tombs. Mortuary ritual functioned as a homeostat, providing a mechanism to repair the tear in the fabric of Han society caused by the death of a family member. It accomplished this repair via the transmission of information at the site of the tomb doors. The doors were thus instruments linking the living and the dead and uniting the past, the present and the future for "ten thousand generations."

As wealth and power in outlying regions of the Eastern Han increased, so did the call for mortuary monuments. The rise in mortuary monuments meant that society was unified and leveled by large numbers of people in different regions and with different beliefs all following the officially prescribed mortuary practice and rituals in a public display. The citizens of the Han period lived under a central government but they differed in habit, custom, dress and ritual.

Mortuary architecture was employed as a tool of government to consolidate the empire. Performance and participation in officially sanctioned rites, which were initiated by the Eastern Han, were the great leveling agent unifying the various populations of the Han empire. It is the construction of mortuary architecture on a level plain that allowed the living members of the Han mortuary audience, in their ritual conditions, to enter the structure for performance of ritual at the tomb. Within the tomb, it was the doors and doorways of the tombs that regulated the pattern and format of the rituals. These practices added a new public dimension to Han mortuary architecture and its attendant arts.

== See also ==
- Early and simple domes
