= Jiangzhang railway station =

Railway station in Baoji, Shaanxi

Jiangzhang 绛帐
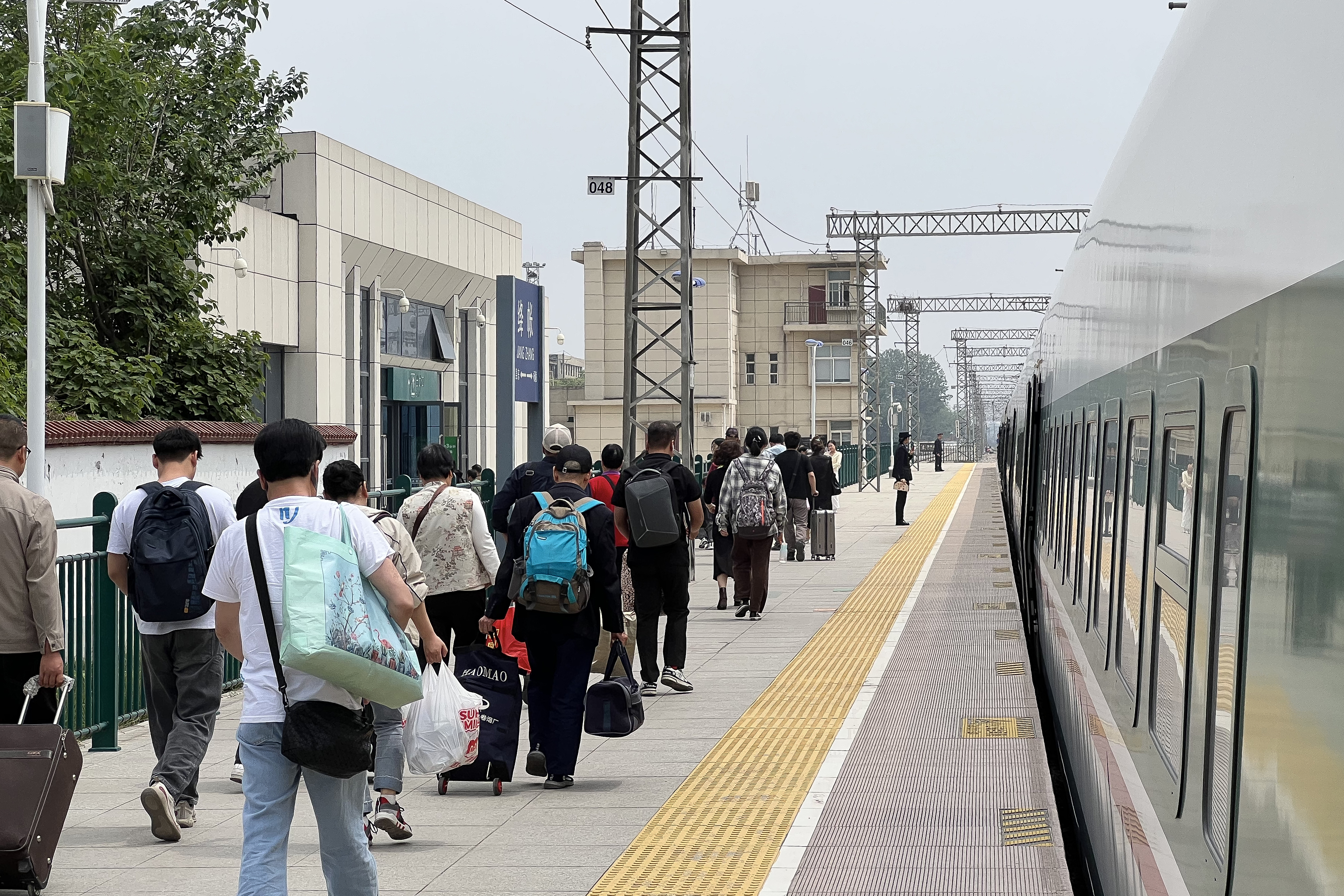

General information
- Location: Jiangzhang, Fufeng County, Baoji, Shaanxi; China
- Coordinates: 34.27426°N 107.94831°E
- Line: Longhai railway

Other information
- Station code: 39545

History
- Opened: 1936
Location

Jiangzhang railway station (Chinese: 绛帐站; pinyin: Jiàngzhàng zhàn) is a railway station in Jiangzhang, Fufeng County, Baoji, Shaanxi, China. It opened in 1936 on the Longhai railway. Passenger services were suspended in 2004. In September 2022, it was announced that passenger services would be restored in early September. However, the service started later, with three trains each way introduced on 10 November 2022.

Preceding station	China Railway	Following station
Yangling towards Lianyungang East	Longhai railway	Caijiapo towards Lanzhou
