= Western Han dynasty imperial tombs =

Imperial burial grounds in China

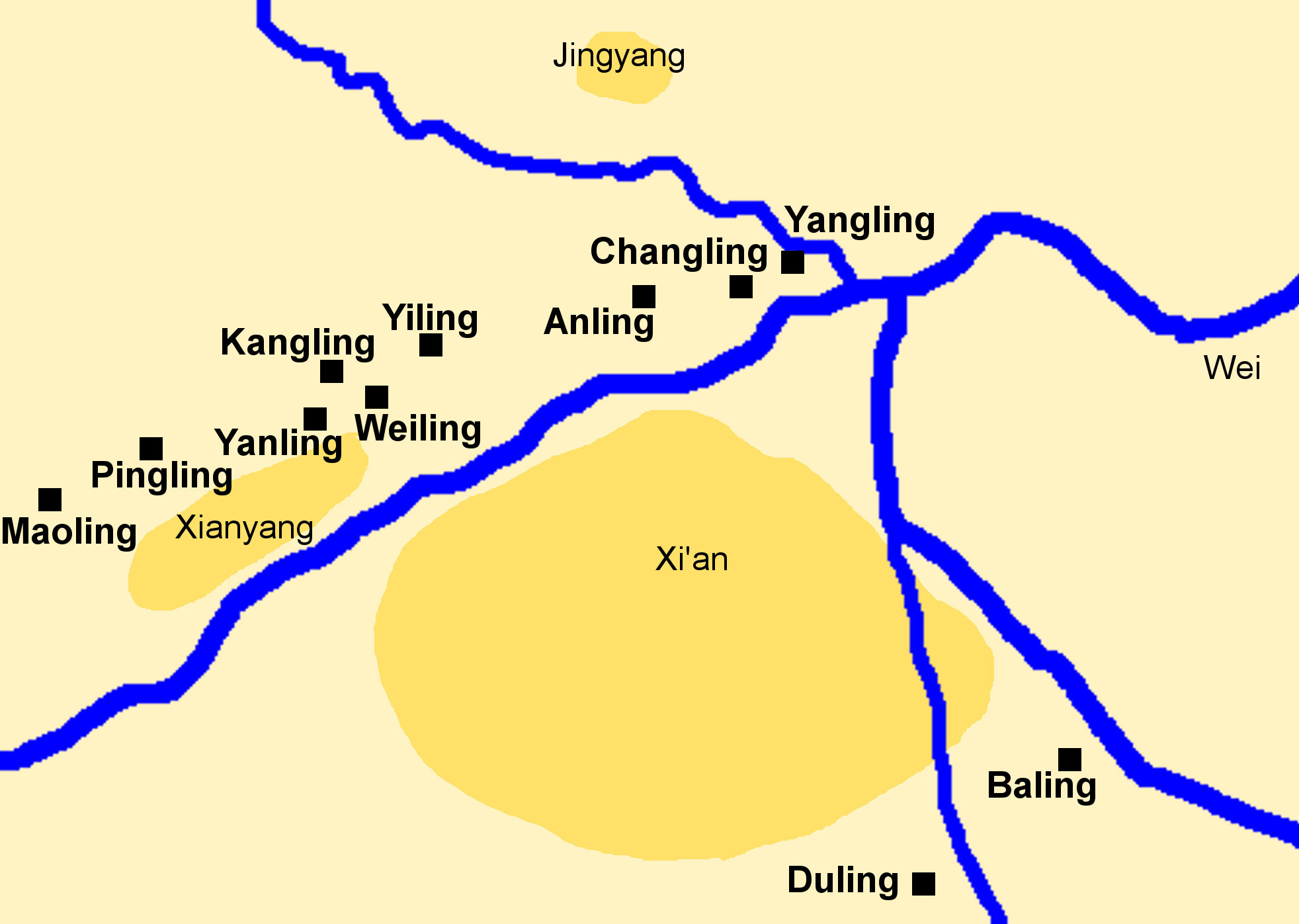
The Western Han dynasty imperial tombs

The Western Han dynasty imperial tombs (西汉帝陵; Xīhàn dìlíng) are a series of eleven imperial burial grounds from the Chinese Western Han dynasty (206 BC–24 AD) in Shaanxi Province. Two of the emperor's mausoleums are located southeast of today's Xi'an, which was then the capital of the Western Han dynasty, Chang'an, and the other nine mausoleums are located in a string of pearls in an east–west direction north of the Wei River in Xianyang Prefecture north of Xi'an. The line of tombs stretches from Xingping in the west to Pingling in the east. The nine burial areas can be roughly divided into three districts: the eastern one around Changling with Anling and Yangling, the western one with Maoling and Pingling and the central district around Weiling with Yanling, Yiling and Kangling. There were officially thirteen emperors who ruled the Western Han dynasty. Empress Dowager Lü does not have her own tomb but is buried together in Changling with Liu Bang. It is unclear where the last emperor of the Western Han dynasty, Ruzi Ying, is buried. The construction of the tomb complexes usually started during the respective emperor's second year as regent.

With the exception of the Yangling tomb, none of the tombs have been archaeologically excavated. The identification of the burial mounds is mainly based on texts from the stele erected in front of each grave. The tombs of the Western Han dynasty became a source of inspiration for the imperial tombs of several subsequent dynasties, such as the Eighteen Imperial Tombs of the Tang Dynasty and the Six Song Mausoleums.

== Execution ==
The Yanling-tomb

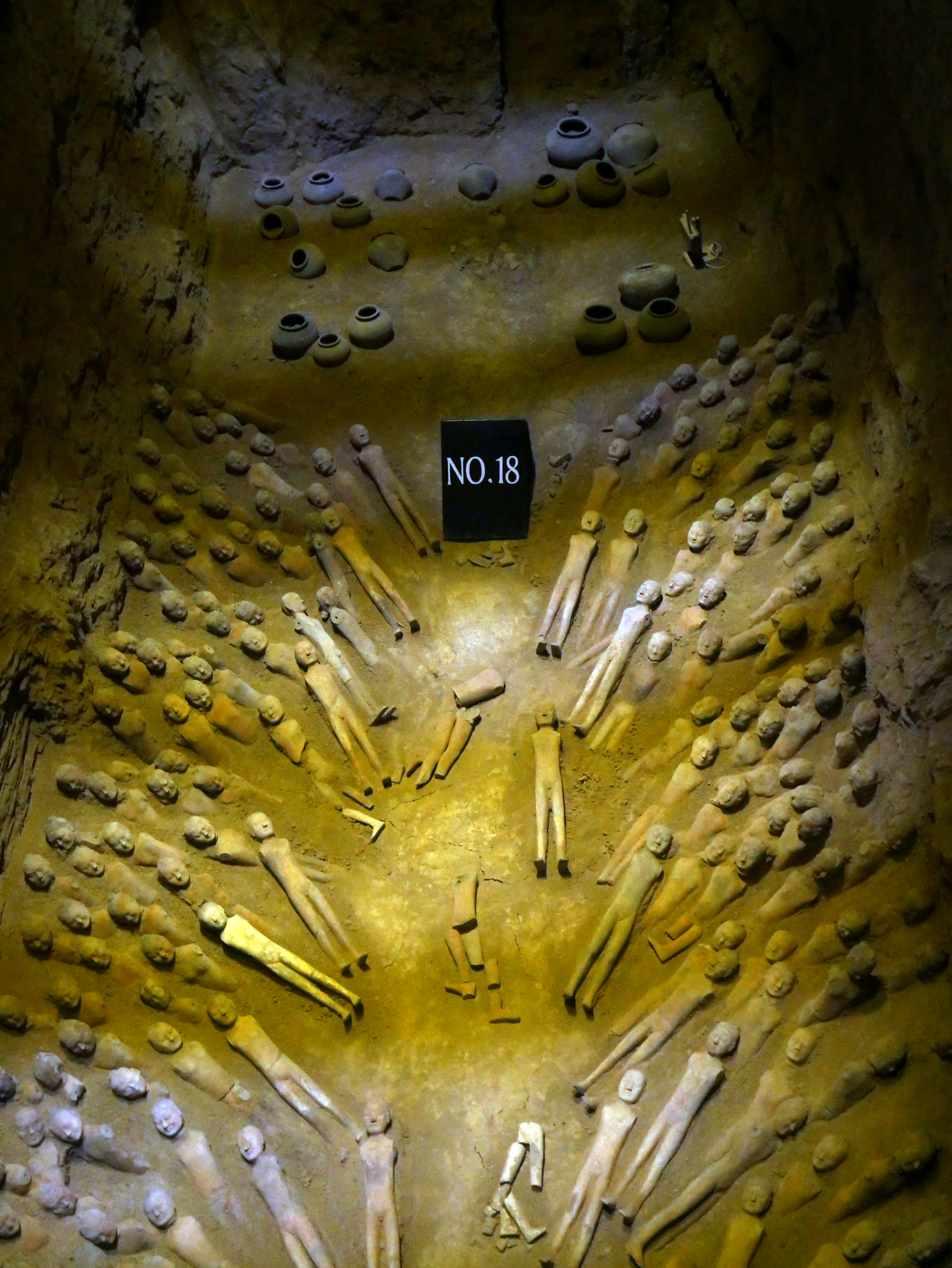
Grave goods from Yangling.

With the exception of Baling, all of the Western Han dynasty imperial tombs follow a consistent architectural pattern that is basically inspired by the mausoleum of Qin Shi Huangdi (died 210 BC). The emperor's burial chamber is covered with a large square or rectangular truncated packed earth pyramid with a flat plateau as the top surface. The sides of the base are usually 150 to 170 meters and the height 20 to 30 meters. Maoling is distinguished by being significantly larger. Some of the graves are designed with a two-step top toe. The tombs contain several decorated chambers containing grave goods, and the burial grounds have ritual architectural features such as processional routes and gates.

The walls around the burial areas are built of bauxite and several are still visible. The burial grounds are usually about 410 to 430 meters long and the walls were eight to ten meters thick with a gate in the middle along each side with the east as the main entrance. The layout of the burial grounds is often inspired by Changle Palace or Weiyang Palace.

All of the Western Han dynasty imperial burial grounds contain multiple tombs, often with their own burial mounds. The empresses of the emperors are buried in the same burial area, but in separate burial chambers. Overall, the empress's tomb is smaller and placed to the east of the emperor's. The exception is Empress Lü who is buried together with Emperor Liu Bang. In connection with the burial grounds, a burial city was also built where rich and influential people lived.

The first two tombs Changling and Anling have rectangular bases, while the subsequent ones have square bases. Due to erosion, it is unclear exactly how large the tombs originally were, but based on the Han dynasty unit of length, the bu (步), at that time 1,386 meter, it is likely that the base of the first two tanneries was 100 by 120 bu (about 139 x 166 meters), and the subsequent ones with a square base had side lengths of 120, 160 or 180 bu. (about 166, 222 or 249 meters).

The sides of the burial mounds are oriented in line with the cardinal points with varying degrees of accuracy. Some lie with only a few degrees of deviation, while others vary with up to 14 degrees of deviation from the north–south axis. A possible explanation for the orientation of the graves with the greater deviations is that in the application of feng shui, the consideration of the surrounding environment has weighed more heavily than the orientation towards the cardinal points.

The Baling-tomb is the big exception that deviates from all of the above. The burial chambers in Baling are carved directly into a natural rock. It is unclear why Baling deviates in execution, but one conceivable explanation may have been financial, but there are several other proposed explanatory models.

== The tombs ==
- Changling
- Anling
- Yangling
- Maoling
- Pingling
- Weiling
- Yanling
- Yiling
- Kangling
- Baling
- Duling
