= Caijiapo railway station =

Railway station in Baoji, China

Caijiapo 蔡家坡
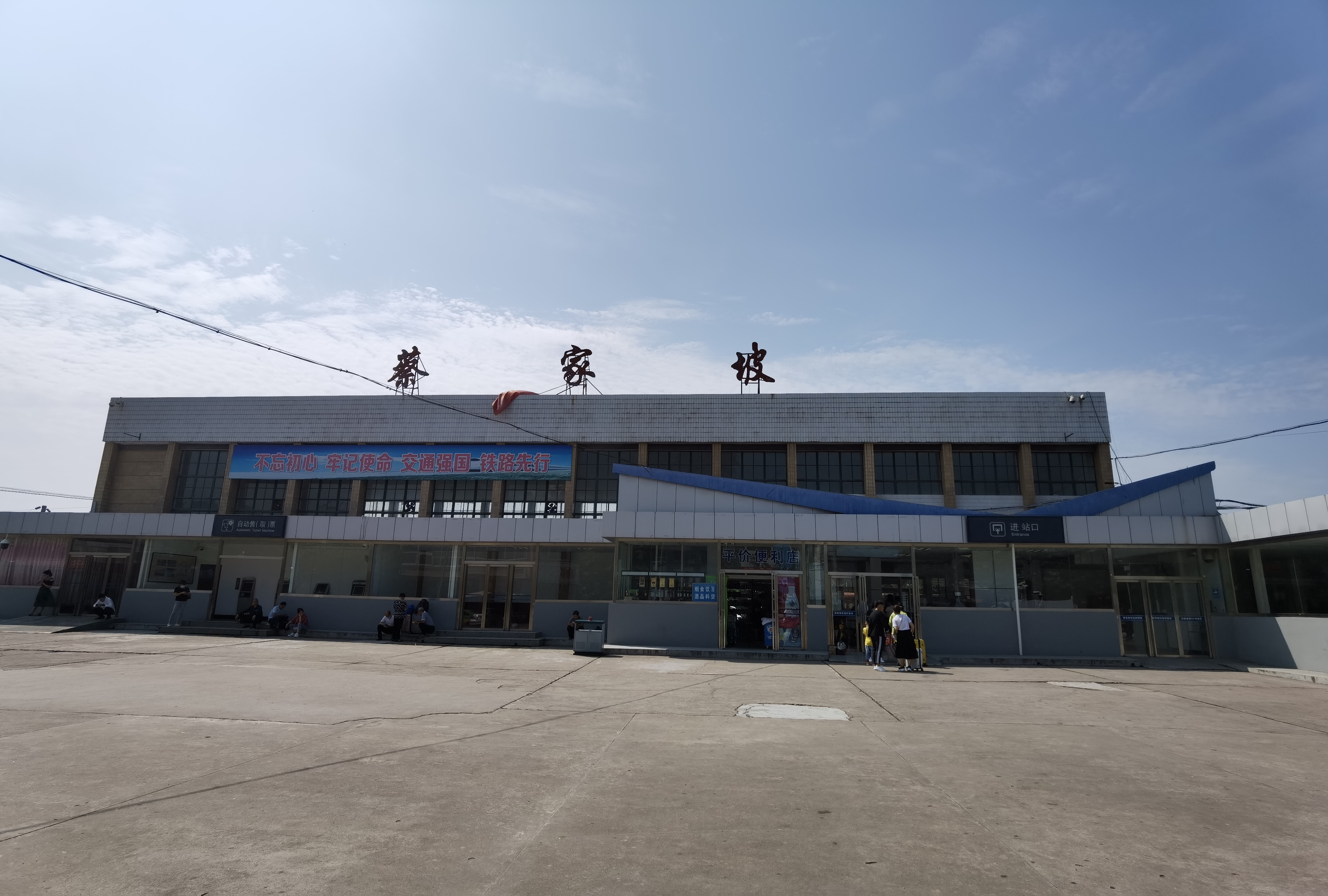

General information
- Location: Western section of Ziqiang Road; Caijiapo Town, Qishan County, Baoji, Shaanxi; China
- Coordinates: 34.3227°N 107.5936°E
- Operator: CR Xi'an
- Line: Longhai Railway
- Platforms: 3 (1 side platform and 1 island platform)
- Tracks: 6

Other information
- Station code: 39557 (TMIS code); CJY (telegraph code); CJP (Pinyin code)
- Classification: Class 2 station (二等站)

History
- Opened: 1936

Services
Preceding station	China Railway	Following station
Jiangzhang towards Lianyungang East	Longhai railway	Guozhen towards Lanzhou
Location
- Location within China

Caijiapo railway station (Chinese: 蔡家坡站) is a station on Longhai railway in Qishan County, Baoji, Shaanxi.

== History ==
The station was opened in 1936.
