= Maoling =

Mausoleum of Emperor Wu of Han in Shaanxi, China

Coordinates: 34°20′9.07″N 108°34′13.18″E

- Chinese: 茂陵; pinyin: Mào Líng
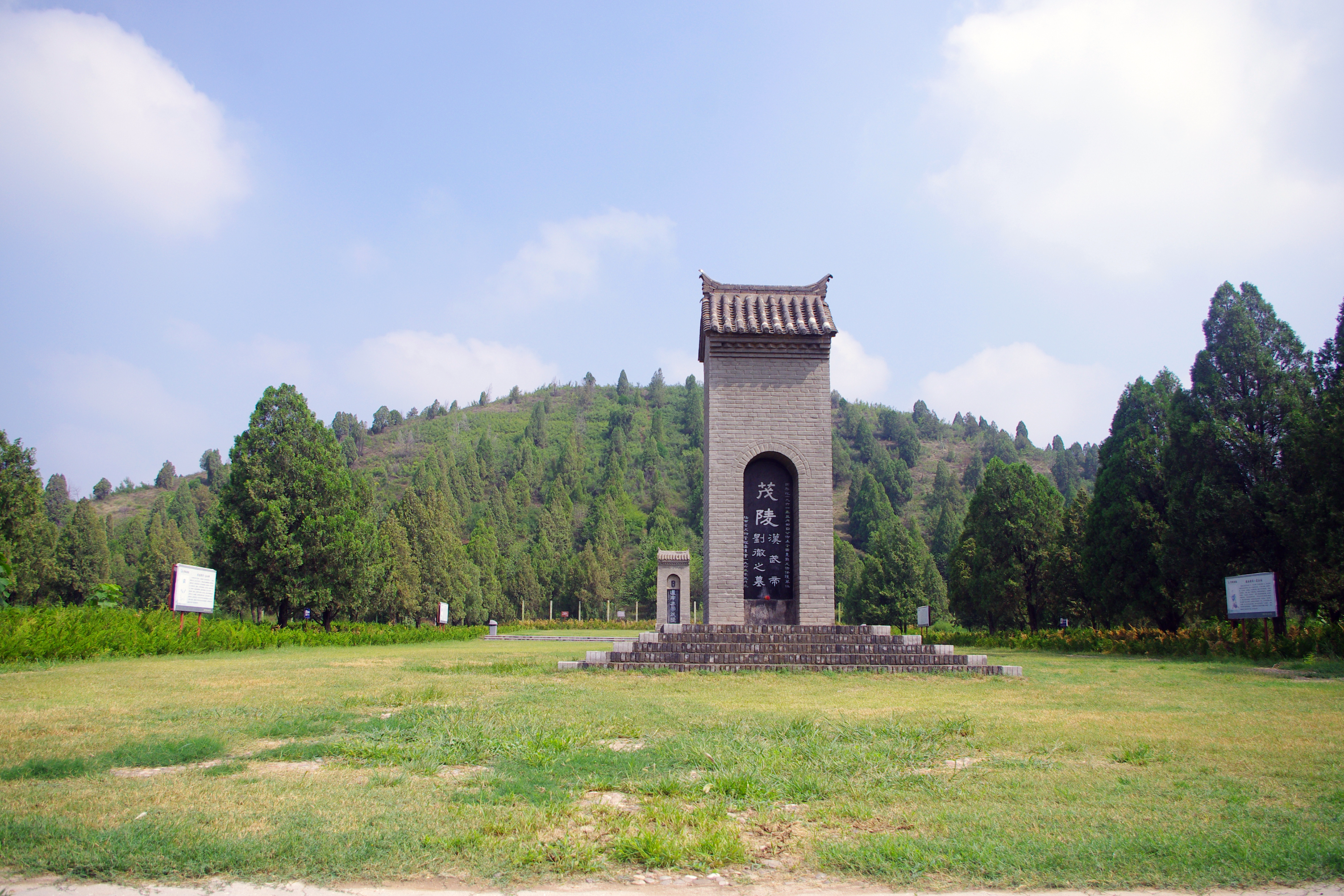
- Interactive map of Maoling
- Location: Xingping, Shaanxi, China
- Beginning date: 139 BC
- Completion date: 86 BC
- Dedicated date: Emperor Wu of Han
- Restored date: Since 2009

The Maoling (Chinese: 茂陵; pinyin: Mào Líng) or Mao Mausoleum is the mausoleum of Emperor Wu of Han (157–87 BC) located in Xingping, Shaanxi, China, about 40 km to the west of the provincial capital of Xi'an. Maoling is one of the Western Han dynasty imperial tombs.

== Background ==
Construction of the tomb began in 139 BC, the second year in the reign of Emperor Wu and took 53 years until completion upon the emperor's death. About one third of the court's annual revenue from taxes and tributes was used towards construction of the tomb.

Maoling is the largest in a group of more than 20 tombs. The smaller tombs surrounding it belong to former members of Emperor Wu's court, such as Lady Li, the emperor's favorite concubine, and the military strategist Huo Qubing (died 117 BC).

The town of Maoling was created during the construction of the tomb.

The artifacts found in Wu's tomb are now in the Maoling Museum. The museum exhibits 4,100 cultural objects and 14 historical relics.

The golden horse of Maoling, the largest gilded horse ever found in China, was discovered in 1981 by farmers in a field nearby the mausoleum. In 1985, geophysical explorations of the area led to the discovery of gold deposits in and around the mausoleum's soils, estimated to be deposits from proterozoic sedimentary rocks.

In 2009, restoration of the site began. The Chinese authorities aimed at preserving as much as possible the original construction material, but admitted that at least half of that material will be replaced because it was in poor conditions. In 2014, the Shaanxi Conservation Institute and the Wuhan University led a joint surveillance study on the site.

== Description ==
The tomb is the largest of all tombs built during the Han dynasty. It is also well known as "Great White Pyramid" since U.S. Army Air Corps pilot James Gaussman saw it as "a white jewel-topped pyramid during a flight between India and China during World War II" (see Chinese pyramids).

It is a trapezoidal tumulus built from rammed earth with a rectangular base which measures 222 by 217 metres (728 by 712 ft) and a height of 47 metres (154 ft).

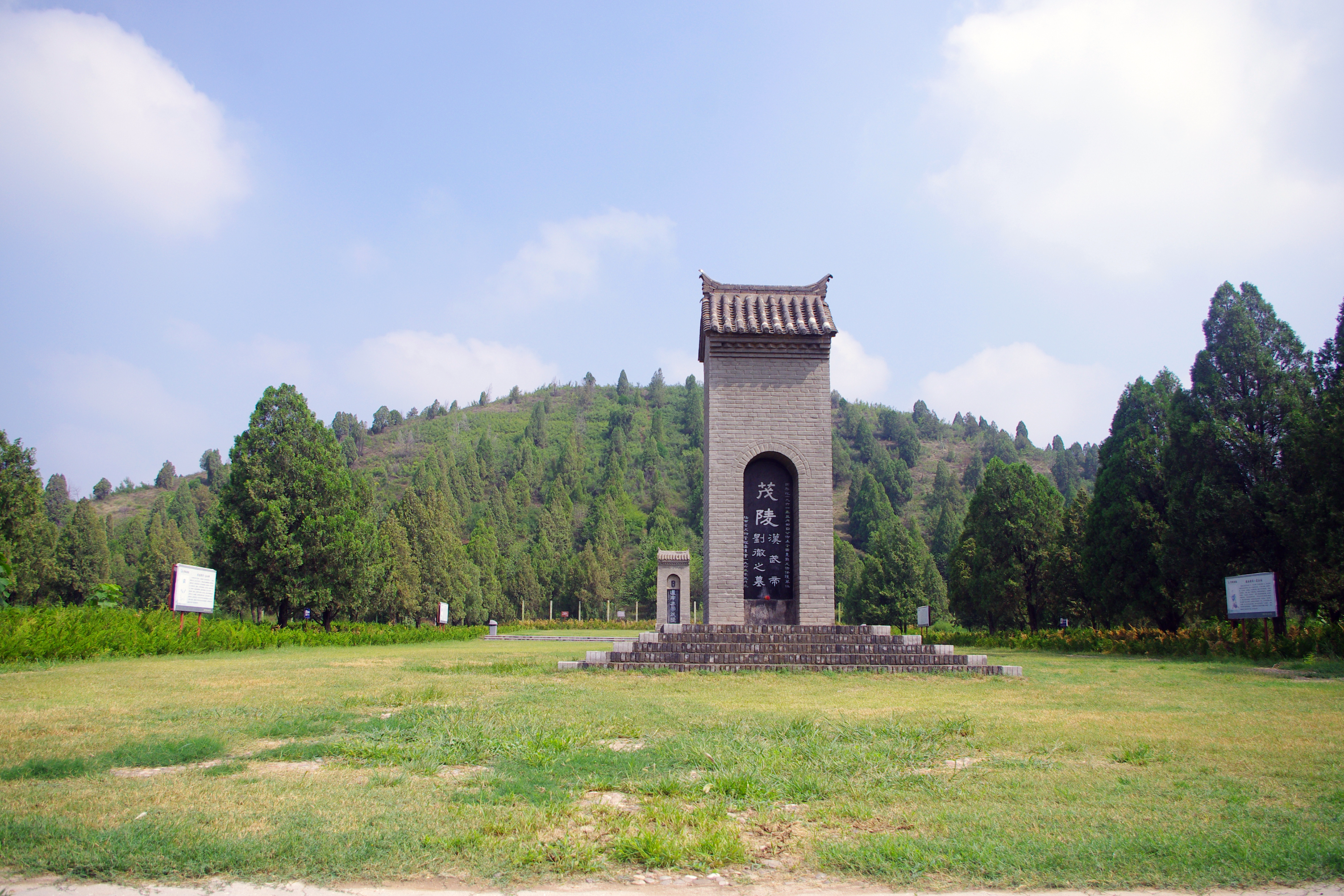
Main building.

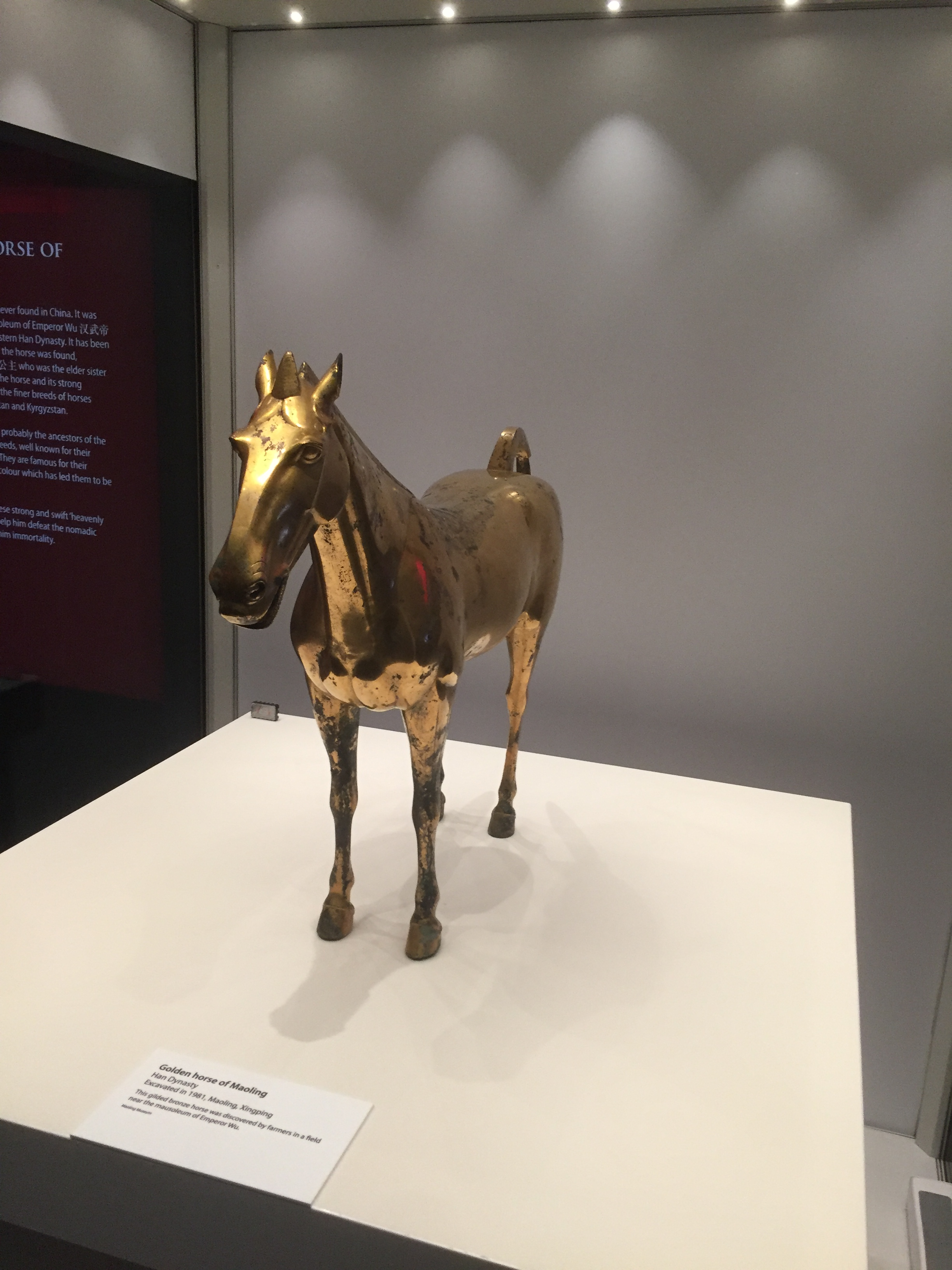
The golden horse of Maoling, exhibited in Liverpool.

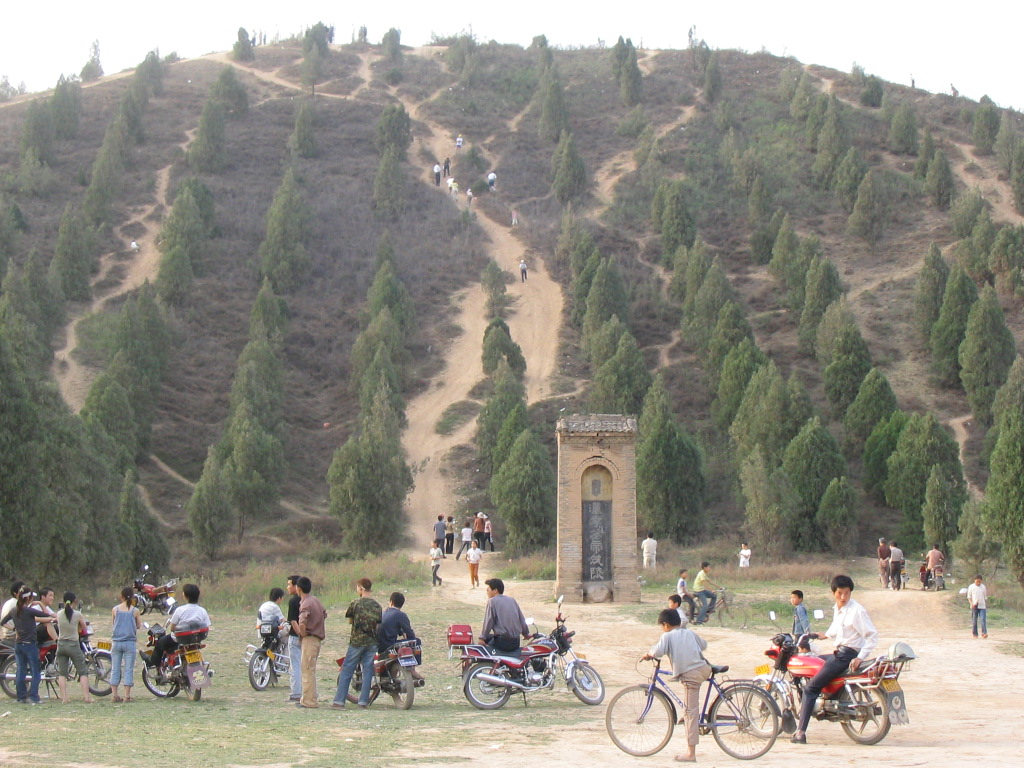
The tumulus

== See also ==
- Chinese pyramids
- "Maoling" is also the name of one of the Ming Dynasty Tombs to the northwest of Beijing
