= Han Changling =

Mausoleum in Shaanxi, China

Coordinates: 34°26′5″N 108°52′35″E

Changling
- Chinese: 长陵; pinyin: Cháng Líng
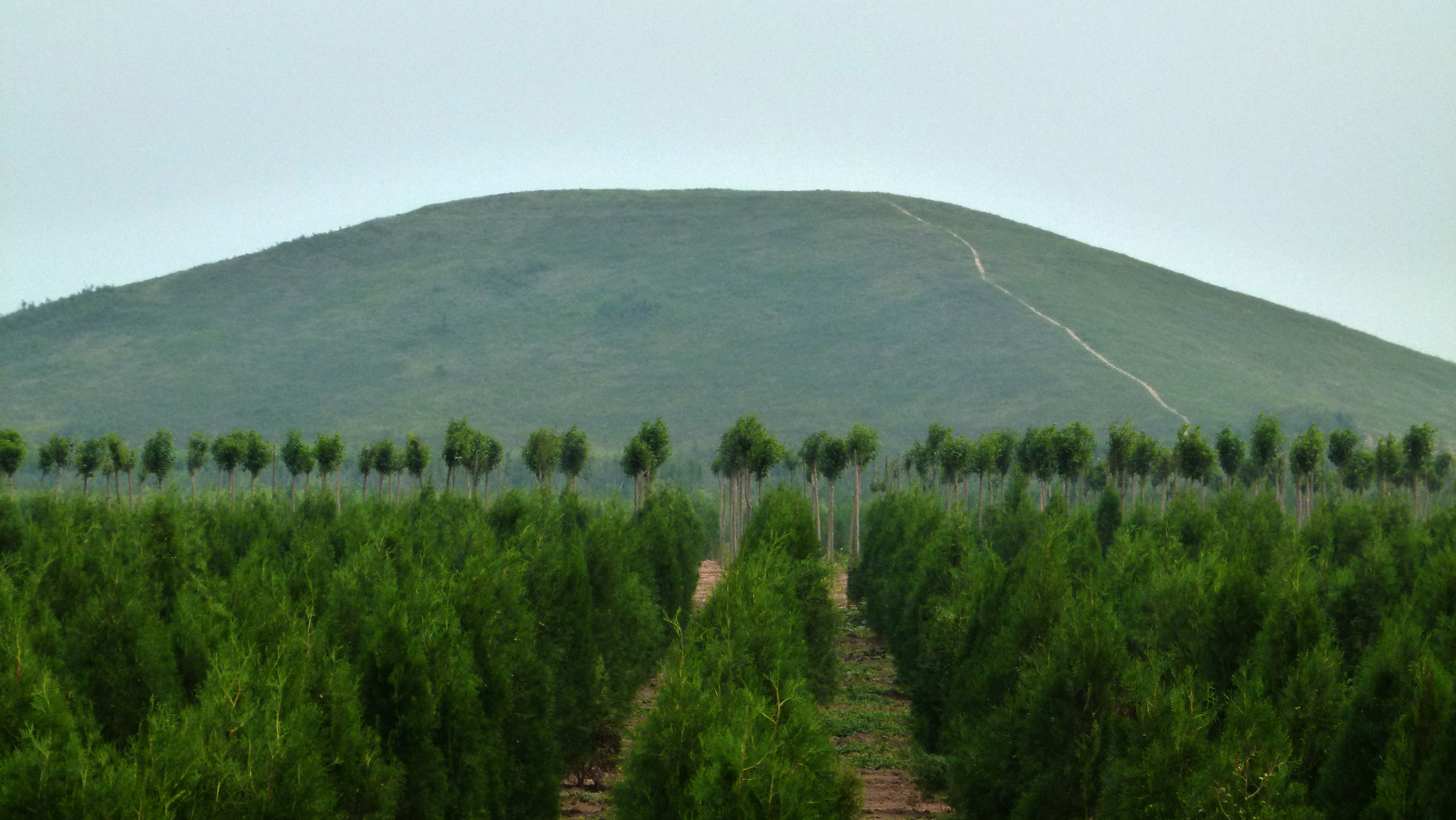
- Interactive map of Changling
- Location: Weicheng District, Xianyang, Shaanxi, China
- Dedicated date: Emperor Gaozu of Han; Empress Lü

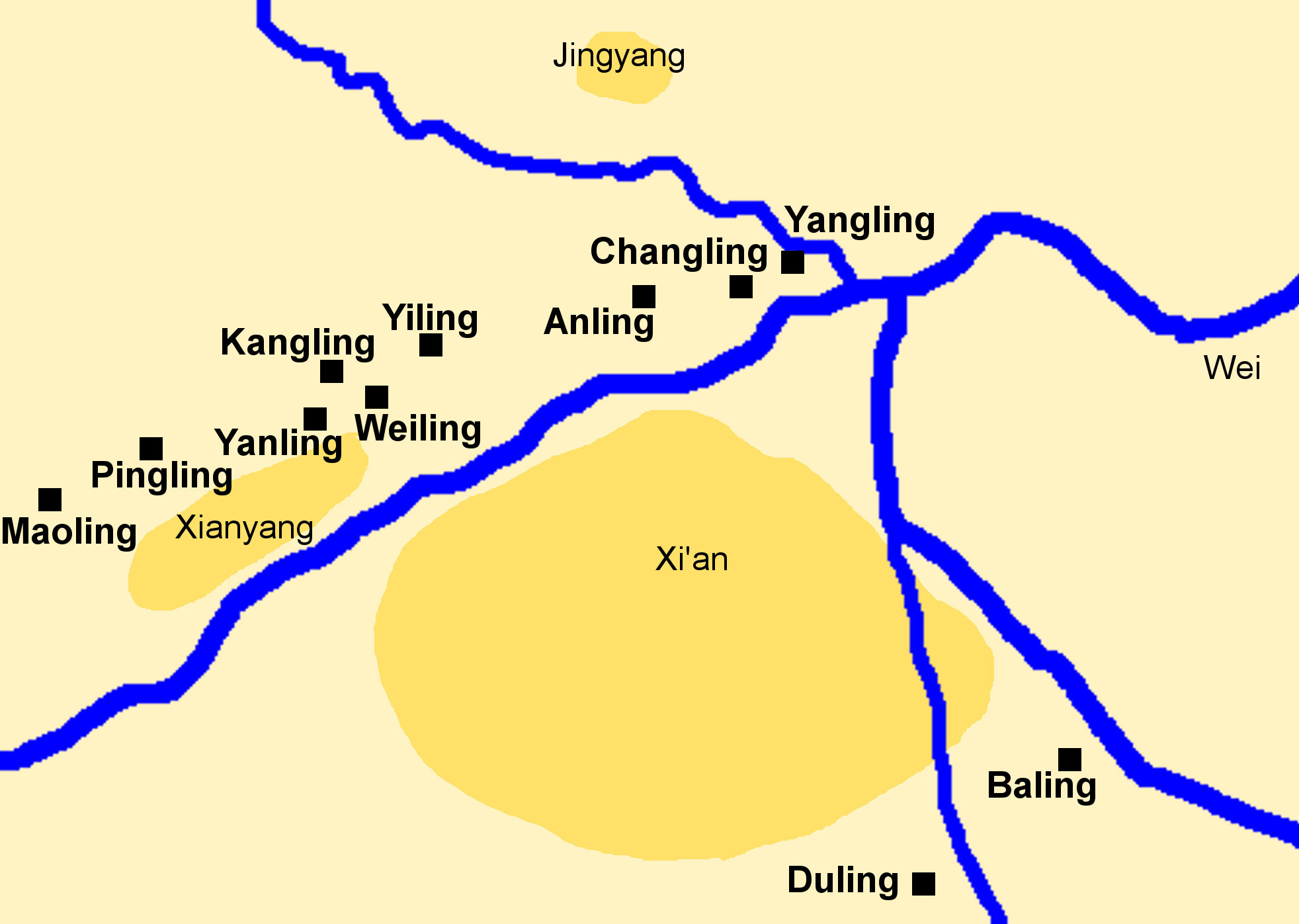
The location of Changling and the other Western Han dynasty imperial tombs.

The Changling (Chinese: 长陵; pinyin: Cháng Líng) or Chang Mausoleum is the mausoleum of the Han dynasty Emperor Gaozu (256–195 BCE), and for his wife Empress Lü (241–180 BC). The Chang Mausoleum is located in the north of Sanyi Village in Yaodian Town in Weicheng District east of Xianyang in Shaanxi, China, about 20 km to the north of the provincial capital of Xi'an. Changling is one of the eleven Western Han dynasty imperial tombs located in the area around today's Xi'an.

Emperor Gaozu, also known as Liu Bang, was the founder of the Western Han dynasty and reigned from 202 BC until he died of illness in 195 BC when he was buried in Chang Mausoleum. The mausoleum was modeled after the mausoleum of the First Qin Emperor, but smaller in scale and a replica of the Chang'an city. The Chang Mausoleum was built in the crossing point of Wei River and Jing River on the top point of the Xianyang Plain, leaning against the Weiyang Palace and Changle Palace in the south and Jiushan Mountain in the north. It gained prestige among Gaozu's successors as they built similar structures based on and near Chang mausoleum.

The whole burial area is composed of three parts; the graveyard, the mausoleum city and the satellite tomb area. The graveyard has square layout and is 1,000 meters long from south to north and 900 meters wide from east to west. The tomb for the emperor is located in the west of the area and the empress tomb is to the east. Parts of the northern southern and western walls that surrounded the graveyard could still be found. The burial mounds are built of rammed earth in pyramids shape. The emperors tomb is about 32 meters high.

According to the records, about 50 000 families were living in the mausoleum city. The satellite tombs are located east of the Chang Mausoleum, and stretches for about 7.5 kilometers. There are about 60 earth mounds in the satellite tomb area that exists today, making Changling the most numerous of subordinate tombs of the Western Han dynasty imperial tombs.

During a complete exploration and categorisation in 1970 and 1976 performed by the antiquities committee of Shaanxi Province many relics were discovered.
