= Xingping =

Xingping 兴平市 Hingping
- County-level city
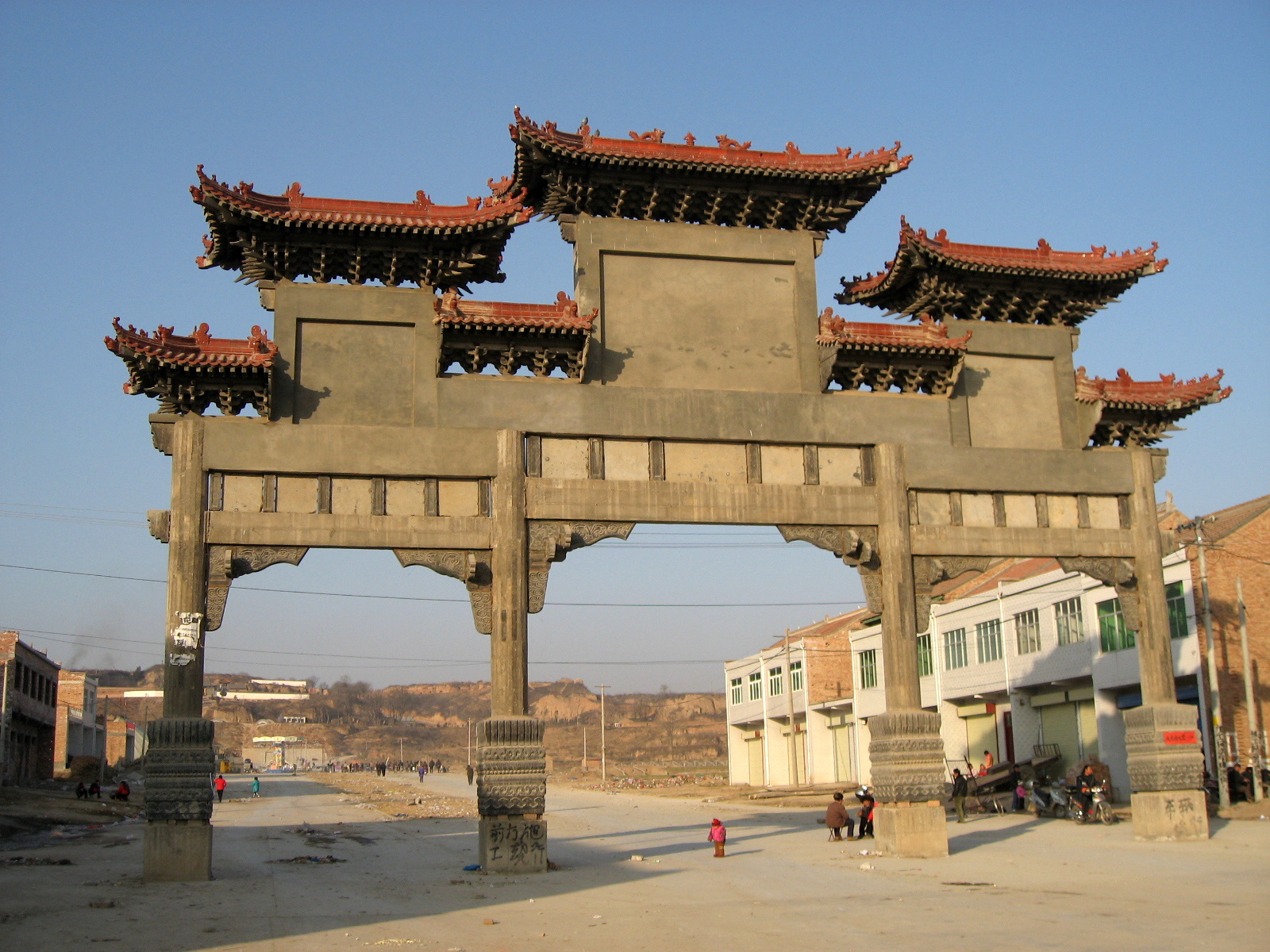

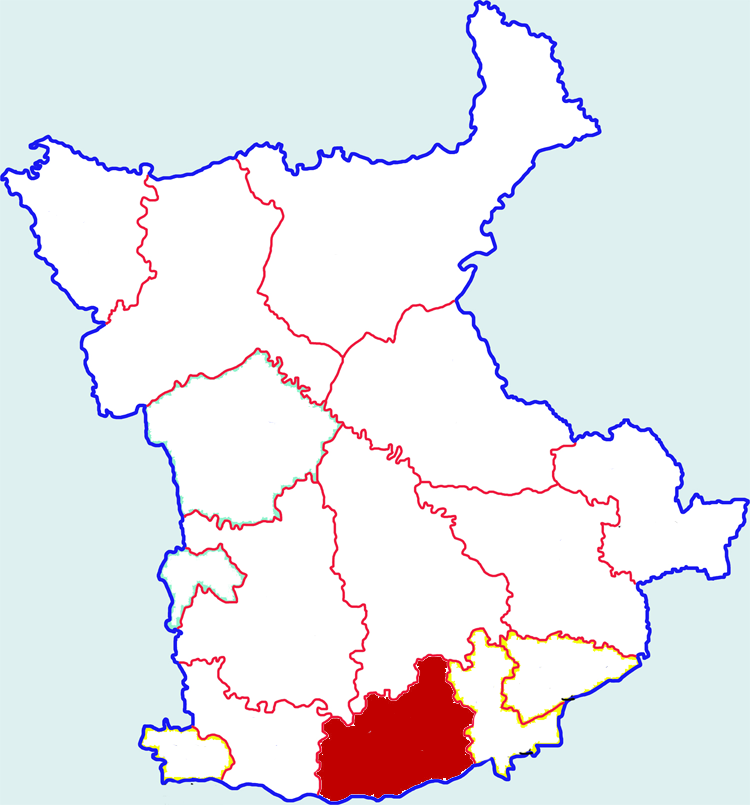
- Xingping in Xianyang

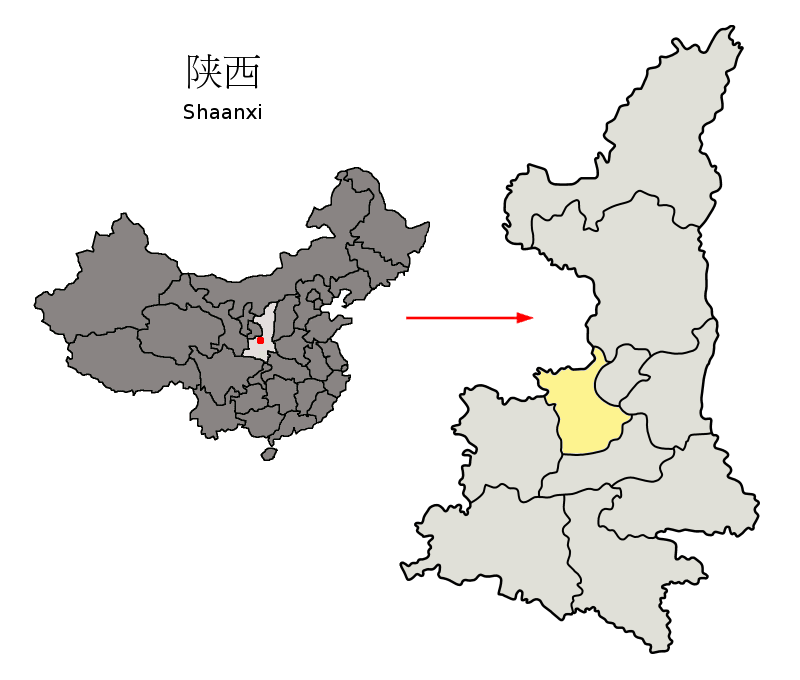
- Xianyang in Shaanxi
- Coordinates: 34°17′58″N 108°29′26″E
- Country: People's Republic of China
- Province: Shaanxi
- Prefecture-level city: Xianyang

Area
  - Total: 496 km^{2} (192 sq mi)

Population (2018)
  - Total: 556,088
  - Density: 1,120/km^{2} (2,900/sq mi)
- Time zone: UTC+8 (China standard time)
- Postal code: 713100
- Area code: (0)029
- Licence plates: 陕D
- Website: www.snxingping.gov.cn

Xingping (simplified Chinese: 兴平; traditional Chinese: 興平; pinyin: Xīngpíng) is a city located in the center part of Shaanxi province, China. It has been a city since 1993, with a total area of 496 square kilometers and a population of 620,000. The annual average temperature is 13.1 °C (55.6 °F) and its annual precipitation of 585 mm (23.0 in). At present, Xingping has developed more than 50 industries including maritime, aviation, electronics, medicine, and light industry. The historic sites of the city (also spelled Hsing-p'ing) can be found in Xingping Old Street and Fishing Village about 2 km (1.2 mi) from the town. The old banyan tree, which needs as many as eight people's outstretched arms to encircle it, and Guandi (General Guan Yu) Temple which was built during the Qing dynasty both tell the long history of the town. Other places of interest in the city includes the tomb of Han Maoling, Huo Yang's tomb and Xingping's North Tower.

Liu Jin (also known as Liu Chin), born circa 1451 or 1452, is from the area of Xingping (Hsing-p'ing). A son of Tan (談) lineage, when he was made a eunuch under the aegis of a eunuch official named Liu, he appropriated that surname. Infamous for being an extremely corrupt official who abused his office to amass a great fortune, he was executed in Beijing in 1510 for treason by a "thousand cuts" over a three-day period. He died on the 2nd day after 300 to 400 cuts. Witnesses at the time said that angry onlookers bought a piece of his flesh for one qian (the smallest currency at the time) and consumed it with rice wine.

== Administrative divisions ==
As of 2016, this city is divided to 5 subdistricts and 7 towns.

Subdistricts

- Dongcheng Subdistrict (东城街道)
- Western City Subdistrict (西城街道)
- Dianzhang Subdistrict (店张街道)
- Xiwu Subdistrict (西吴街道)
- Mawei Subdistrict (马嵬街道)

Towns

- Zhaocun (赵村镇)
- Nanshi (南市镇)
- Zhuangtou (庄头镇)
- Nanwei (南位镇)
- Fuzhai (阜寨镇)
- Fengyi (丰仪镇)
- Tangfang (汤坊镇)

== Climate ==
Climate data for Xingping, elevation 411 m (1,348 ft), (1991–2020 normals, extremes 1966–present)
| Month | Jan | Feb | Mar | Apr | May | Jun | Jul | Aug | Sep | Oct | Nov | Dec | Year |
|---|---|---|---|---|---|---|---|---|---|---|---|---|---|
| Record high °C (°F) | 17.8 (64.0) | 24.0 (75.2) | 30.4 (86.7) | 35.2 (95.4) | 37.4 (99.3) | 42.2 (108.0) | 43.1 (109.6) | 38.2 (100.8) | 37.3 (99.1) | 31.2 (88.2) | 25.7 (78.3) | 22.9 (73.2) | 43.1 (109.6) |
| Mean daily maximum °C (°F) | 5.3 (41.5) | 9.6 (49.3) | 15.5 (59.9) | 21.7 (71.1) | 26.6 (79.9) | 31.7 (89.1) | 32.6 (90.7) | 30.2 (86.4) | 25.3 (77.5) | 19.5 (67.1) | 12.9 (55.2) | 6.8 (44.2) | 19.8 (67.7) |
| Daily mean °C (°F) | −0.1 (31.8) | 3.6 (38.5) | 9.2 (48.6) | 15.1 (59.2) | 19.9 (67.8) | 25.1 (77.2) | 27.0 (80.6) | 25.0 (77.0) | 19.9 (67.8) | 13.9 (57.0) | 7.0 (44.6) | 1.2 (34.2) | 13.9 (57.0) |
| Mean daily minimum °C (°F) | −4.1 (24.6) | −0.9 (30.4) | 4.0 (39.2) | 9.3 (48.7) | 14.0 (57.2) | 19.3 (66.7) | 22.3 (72.1) | 21.0 (69.8) | 16.1 (61.0) | 10.0 (50.0) | 2.8 (37.0) | −3.0 (26.6) | 9.2 (48.6) |
| Record low °C (°F) | −18.4 (−1.1) | −14.5 (5.9) | −8.0 (17.6) | −1.5 (29.3) | 2.7 (36.9) | 9.2 (48.6) | 14.9 (58.8) | 12. (54) | 5.7 (42.3) | −3.3 (26.1) | −7.1 (19.2) | −17.8 (0.0) | −18.4 (−1.1) |
| Average precipitation mm (inches) | 6.3 (0.25) | 9.9 (0.39) | 25.7 (1.01) | 37.8 (1.49) | 54.9 (2.16) | 67.1 (2.64) | 75.6 (2.98) | 93.0 (3.66) | 101.5 (4.00) | 57.7 (2.27) | 22.5 (0.89) | 4.7 (0.19) | 556.7 (21.93) |
| Average precipitation days (≥ 0.1 mm) | 3.6 | 4.2 | 6.6 | 6.9 | 9.3 | 8.5 | 9.1 | 9.6 | 11.7 | 10.1 | 5.8 | 2.9 | 88.3 |
| Average snowy days | 3.6 | 2.8 | 1.0 | 0.1 | 0 | 0 | 0 | 0 | 0 | 0 | 1.0 | 1.9 | 10.4 |
| Average relative humidity (%) | 67 | 66 | 66 | 69 | 70 | 65 | 73 | 81 | 83 | 81 | 77 | 69 | 72 |
| Mean monthly sunshine hours | 118.6 | 119.0 | 152.9 | 176.0 | 189.0 | 192.0 | 197.5 | 168.6 | 120.9 | 106.9 | 116.4 | 121.9 | 1,779.7 |
| Percentage possible sunshine | 38 | 38 | 41 | 45 | 44 | 45 | 45 | 41 | 33 | 31 | 38 | 40 | 40 |
Source: China Meteorological Administration all-time extreme temperature
