= Lianyungang East railway station =

Railway station in Lianyungang, China

Lianyungangdong 连云港东
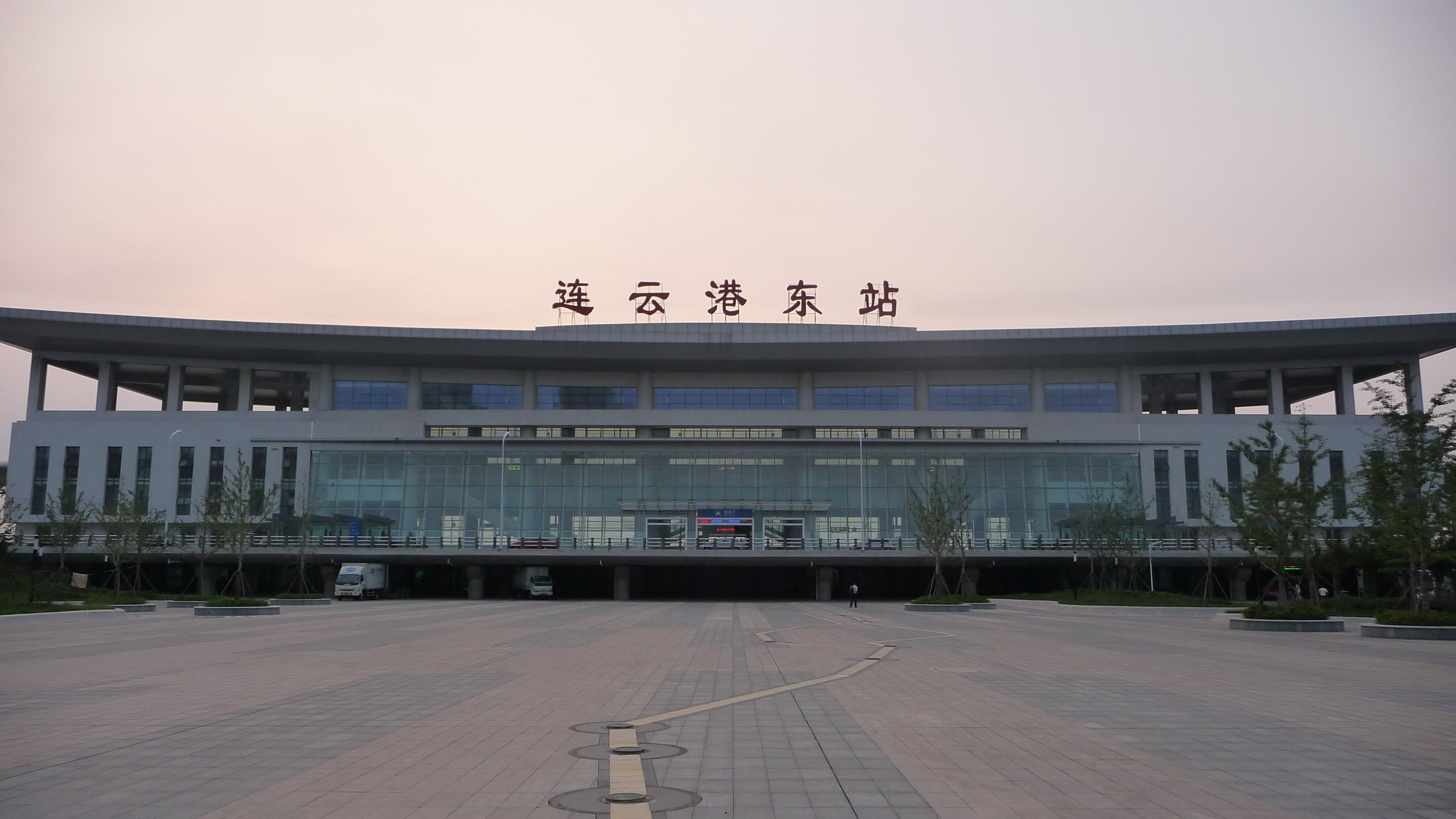

General information
- Location: 1 Wuyang Road; Lianyun District, Lianyungang, Jiangsu; China
- Coordinates: 34.7190°N 119.3352°E
- Operator: CR Shanghai
- Line: Longhai railway
- Platforms: 5 (1 side platform and 2 island platforms)
- Tracks: 10
- Connections: Bus terminal

Other information
- Station code: 38504 (TMIS code); UKH (telegraph code); LYD (Pinyin code)
- Classification: Class 2 station (二等站)

History
- Opened: 1935
- Former names: Zhongyun (Chinese: 中云)

Services
Preceding station	China Railway	Following station
Terminus	Longhai railway	Lianyungang towards Lanzhou
Location
- Location within Jiangsu Location within China

Lianyungangdong (Lianyungang East) railway station (Chinese: 连云港东站) is a station on Longhai railway in Lianyungang, Jiangsu.

== History ==
The station was established in 1935 as Zhongyun railway station (Chinese: 中云站).

On 11 November 2009, since Lianyun railway station, the former eastern terminus of Longhai railway, stopped passenger services, the station became the eastern terminus for passenger trains on Longhai railway, and was renamed to the current name.
