= Pucheng County, Shaanxi =

Pucheng County 蒲城县
- County
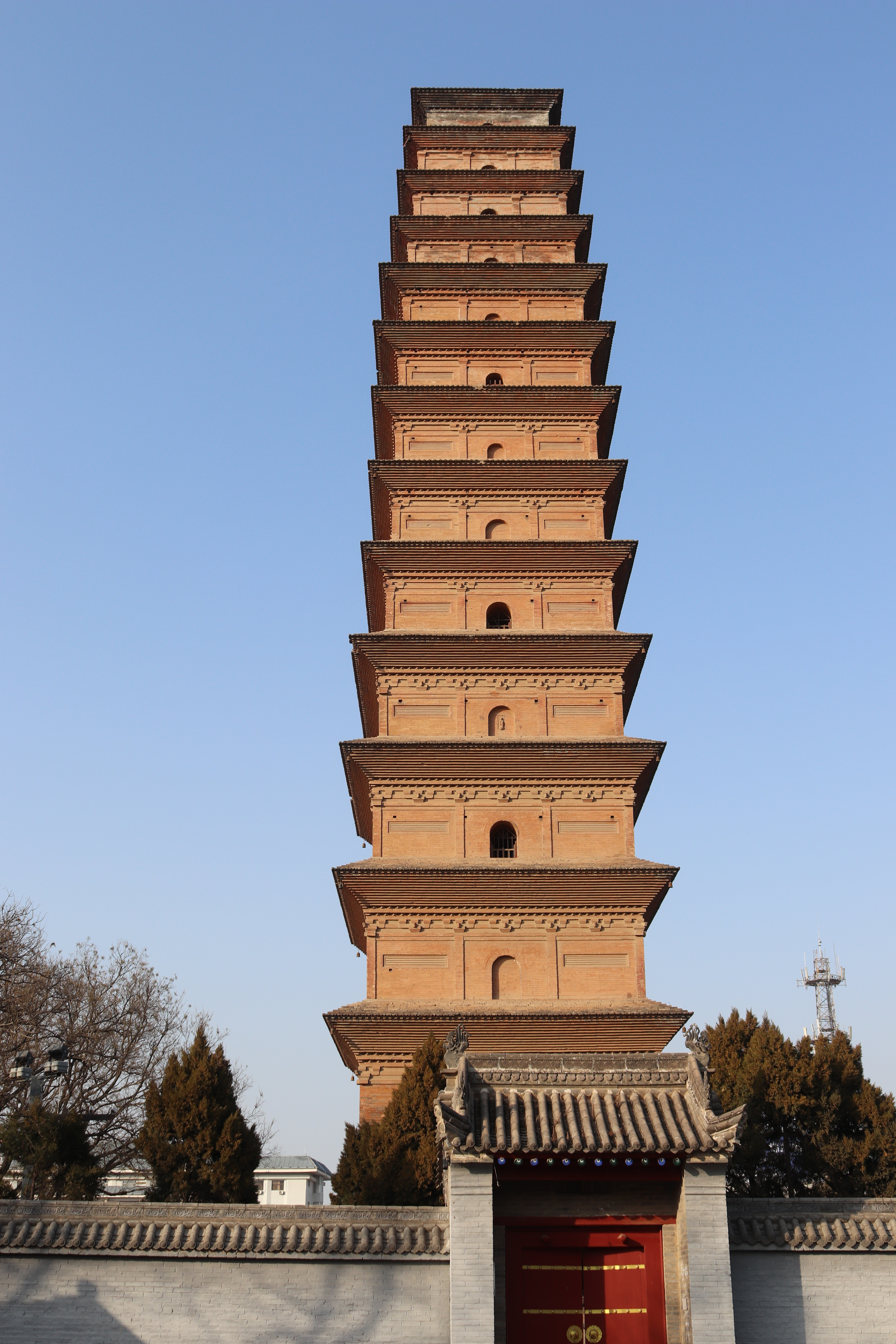
- Beisisong Pagoda

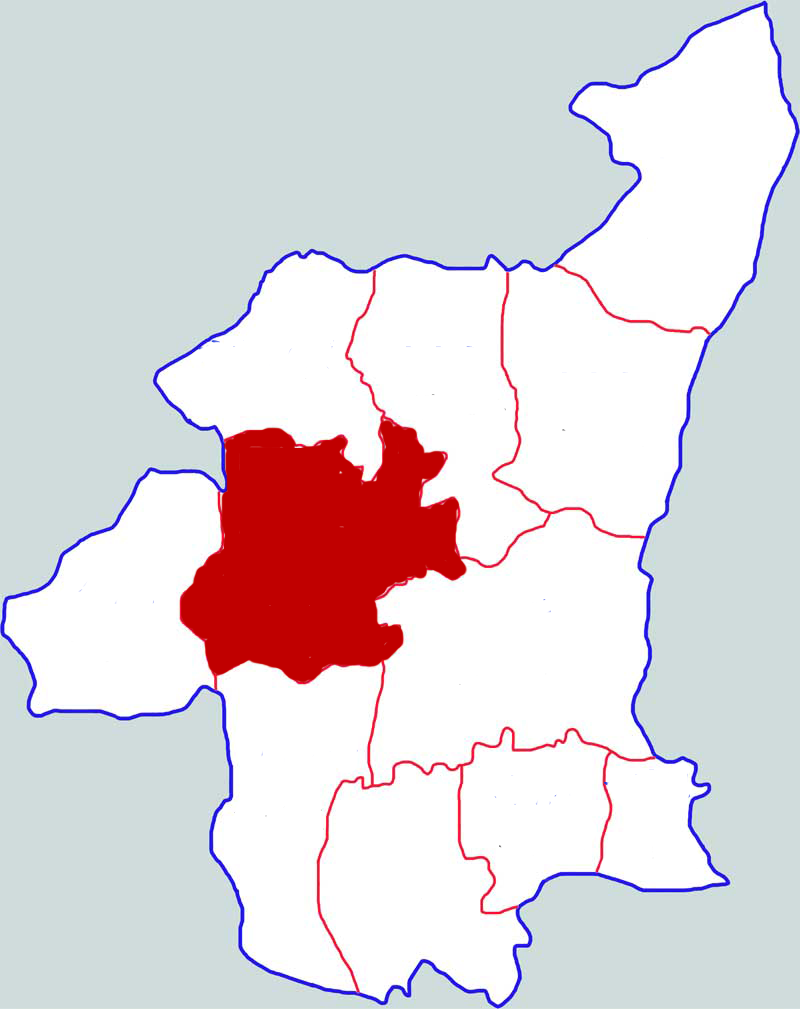
- Pucheng in Weinan

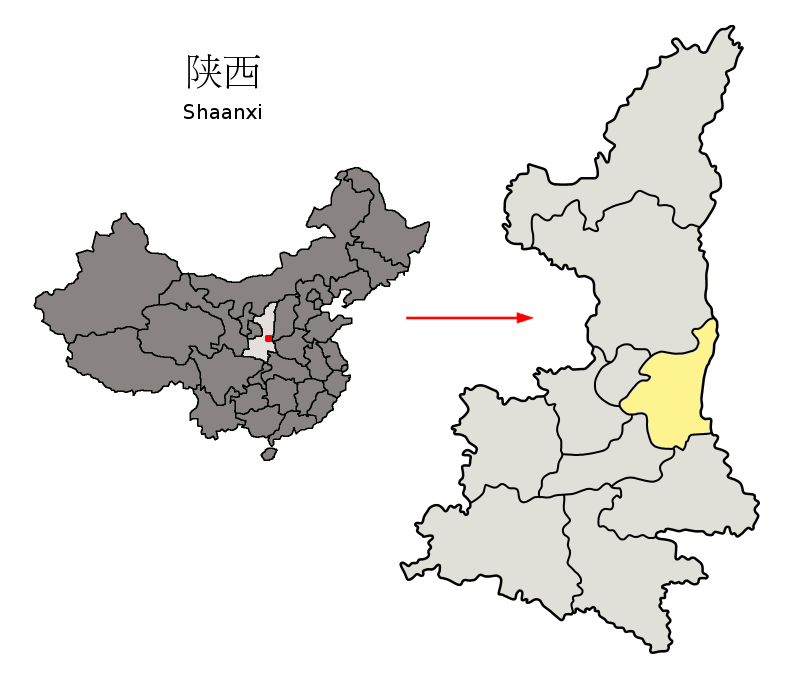
- Weinan in Shaanxi
- Coordinates: 34°57′21″N 109°35′11″E
- Country: People's Republic of China
- Province: Shaanxi
- Prefecture-level city: Weinan

Area
  - Total: 1,583.58 km^{2} (611.42 sq mi)

Population (2022)
  - Total: 761,776
  - Density: 481.047/km^{2} (1,245.91/sq mi)
- Time zone: UTC+8 (China standard time)
- Postal Code: 715500

Pucheng County (simplified Chinese: 蒲城县; traditional Chinese: 蒲城縣; pinyin: Púchéng Xiàn) is a county in the east of Shaanxi province, China. It is under the administration of the prefecture-level city of Weinan. The county spans an area of 1,583.58 square kilometres (611.42 sq mi), and has a total population of 761,776 as of 2022.

== Toponymy ==
According to the Taiping Huanyu Ji, the county derives its name from an ancient city named Pucheng (Chinese: 蒲城; pinyin: Púchéng) in the area that existed during the Western Wei.

== History ==
During the Spring and Autumn period, a city named Chongquan (Chinese: 重泉; pinyin: Chóngquán) was established in the southeast of present-day Pucheng County.

During the Qin dynasty, the area was organized as Chongquan County (simplified Chinese: 重泉县; traditional Chinese: 重泉縣; pinyin: Chóngquán Xiàn). Chongquan County would exist for more than 600 years, before eventually being abolished during the Northern Wei dynasty. In 487 CE, under the Northern Wei, the area was reorganized as Nanbaishui County (simplified Chinese: 南白水县; traditional Chinese: 南白水縣; pinyin: Nánbáishuǐ Xiàn). In 540 CE, during the Western Wei, the area was renamed to Pucheng County (simplified Chinese: 蒲城县; traditional Chinese: 蒲城縣; pinyin: Púchéng Xiàn), its current name. Pucheng County was renamed to Fengxian County (simplified Chinese: 奉先县; traditional Chinese: 奉先縣; pinyin: Fèngxiān Xiàn) in 716 CE, during the Tang dynasty. The new name, Fengxian, was derived from a phrase calling for people to worship Emperor Ruizong, who had died that year, and was buried in the Qiaoling Mausoleum located in the county. Fengxian County was renamed back to Pucheng County in 971 CE, during the Song dynasty, and has remained unnamed since.

In January 2025, there were violent protests in Pucheng County after the death of a student in disputed circumstances.

== Geography ==
Pucheng County is located within the central portion of Weinan, in the eastern portion of Shaanxi. It spans an area of 1,583.58 square kilometres (611.42 sq mi), with a maximum east to west distance of 55 kilometres (34 mi), and a maximum north to south distance of 49 kilometres (30 mi). The county is bordered by Chengcheng County and Dali County to the east, Linwei District to the south, Fuping County to the west, Yintai District of the prefecture-level city of Tongchuan to the northwest, and Baishui County to the north.

The county's landscape is split between the Loess Plateau of northern Shaanxi, and the Guanzhong Plain of central Shaanxi. Major rivers in the county include the Luo River, and its tributaries, the Baishui River (Chinese: 白水河; pinyin: Báishuǐ Hé) and the Dayu River (Chinese: 大峪河; pinyin: Dàyù Hé).

=== Climate ===
Climate data for Pucheng, elevation 499 m (1,637 ft), (1991–2020 normals, extremes 1966–present)
Month	Jan	Feb	Mar	Apr	May	Jun	Jul	Aug	Sep	Oct	Nov	Dec	Year
Record high °C (°F)	15.9 (60.6)	23.3 (73.9)	29.1 (84.4)	36.9 (98.4)	38.4 (101.1)	41.8 (107.2)	42.1 (107.8)	39.6 (103.3)	38.4 (101.1)	31.8 (89.2)	24.3 (75.7)	17.3 (63.1)	42.1 (107.8)
Mean daily maximum °C (°F)	5.0 (41.0)	9.4 (48.9)	15.3 (59.5)	22.2 (72.0)	27.1 (80.8)	31.7 (89.1)	32.5 (90.5)	30.5 (86.9)	25.6 (78.1)	19.7 (67.5)	12.6 (54.7)	6.5 (43.7)	19.8 (67.7)
Daily mean °C (°F)	−0.2 (31.6)	3.9 (39.0)	9.4 (48.9)	16.0 (60.8)	20.9 (69.6)	25.7 (78.3)	27.3 (81.1)	25.5 (77.9)	20.6 (69.1)	14.4 (57.9)	7.2 (45.0)	1.3 (34.3)	14.3 (57.8)
Mean daily minimum °C (°F)	−4.0 (24.8)	−0.3 (31.5)	4.8 (40.6)	10.6 (51.1)	15.5 (59.9)	20.4 (68.7)	22.9 (73.2)	21.5 (70.7)	16.8 (62.2)	10.4 (50.7)	3.3 (37.9)	−2.5 (27.5)	10.0 (49.9)
Record low °C (°F)	−13.8 (7.2)	−13.3 (8.1)	−8.1 (17.4)	−0.8 (30.6)	0.7 (33.3)	11.5 (52.7)	15.8 (60.4)	13.8 (56.8)	6.5 (43.7)	−3.7 (25.3)	−10.3 (13.5)	−16.7 (1.9)	−16.7 (1.9)
Average precipitation mm (inches)	5.7 (0.22)	9.3 (0.37)	16.1 (0.63)	30.2 (1.19)	52.5 (2.07)	52.9 (2.08)	92.5 (3.64)	83.1 (3.27)	79.8 (3.14)	49.8 (1.96)	19.7 (0.78)	4.2 (0.17)	495.8 (19.52)
Average precipitation days (≥ 0.1 mm)	3.3	3.6	4.7	6.3	8.1	7.5	9.0	8.9	10.4	8.5	4.8	2.6	77.7
Average snowy days	3.9	2.7	1.3	0.1	0	0	0	0	0	0	1.5	2.7	12.2
Average relative humidity (%)	52	53	53	55	56	55	66	71	71	69	65	56	60
Mean monthly sunshine hours	169.4	154.5	181.7	206.1	226.1	223.4	225.0	209.2	155.3	153.6	155.3	170.0	2,229.6
Percentage possible sunshine	54	50	49	52	52	52	51	51	42	44	51	56	50
Source: China Meteorological Administration all-time extreme temperature

== Administrative divisions ==
As of 2023, Pucheng County is divided to 2 subdistricts and 15 townships. These 17 township-level divisions then, in turn, administered 25 residential communities and 269 administrative villages.

Subdistricts

- Fengxian Subdistrict (奉先街道)
- Zijing Subdistrict (紫荆街道)

Towns

- Hanjing (罕井镇)
- Sun (孙镇)
- Xing (兴镇)
- Dangmu (党睦镇)
- Gaoyang (高阳镇)
- Yongfeng (永丰镇)
- Jingyao (荆姚镇)
- Sufang (苏坊镇)
- Longyang (龙阳镇)
- Luobin (洛滨镇)
- Chenzhuang (陈庄镇)
- Qiaoling (桥陵镇)
- Yaoshan (尧山镇)
- Chunlin (椿林镇)
- Longchi (龙池镇)

== Demographics ==
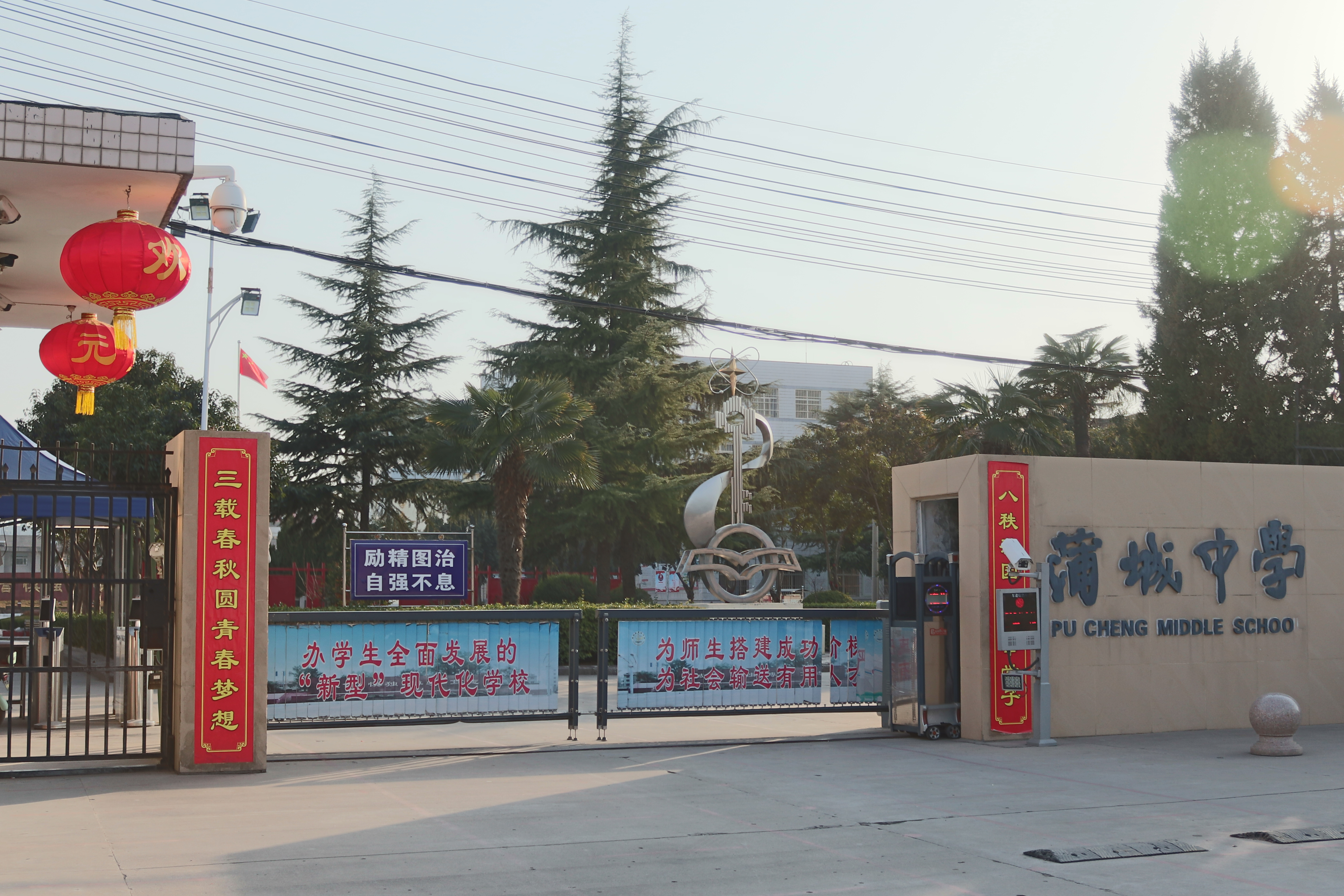
The entrance to Pucheng Middle School

At the end of 2022, Pucheng County had a population of 761,776. Of the county's population, 272,355 people lived in urban areas, and 489,421 lived in rural areas, giving it an urbanization rate of 35.75%. The population included 388,490 males and 373,286 females, giving it a sex ratio of 104.07 males per 100 females. In 2022, the county had a birth rate of 6.27‰, and rate of natural increase of -0.004‰. As of 2022, 18.32% of the county's population was 17 years old and younger, 21.25% was aged 18–34, 37.67% was aged 35–59, and 22.75% was 60 years old and older.

== Economy ==
As of 2022, the county had 92,400 hectares (228,000 acres) of cultivated land. Major crops grown in Pucheng County include wheat, corn, tubers, beans, cotton, rapeseed, apples, pears, peaches, jujubes, apricots, persimmons, and Sichuan peppercorn. The main types of livestock raised in Pucheng County include pigs, chickens, cattle, goats, and sheep.

The most prominent mineral deposits in Pucheng County are coal and limestone, although the county also has deposits of pyrite, bauxite, dolomite, clay, kaolin, mirabilite, geothermal water, humic coal.

== Transport ==
- Pucheng East Railway Station lies on the Xi'an–Yan'an Railway.
