= Weinan (disambiguation) =

Weinan commonly refers to the prefecture-level city in Shaanxi Province in the People's Republic of China, established in 1995.

Weinan may also refer to:

- Linwei District, a district of Weinan city, formerly the county-level city of Weinan (1984-1995).
- Weinan Prefecture, a former prefecture of the People's Republic of China, upgraded into a prefecture-level city in 1995.
- Weinan Town, a town in the Maiji District, Tianshui, Gansu Province, People's Republic of China.
- Weinan E, a Chinese mathematician.
- Wei Nan, a badminton player from Hong Kong.
