= Lingbao West railway station =

Railway station in Lingbao City, China

Lingbaoxi 灵宝西
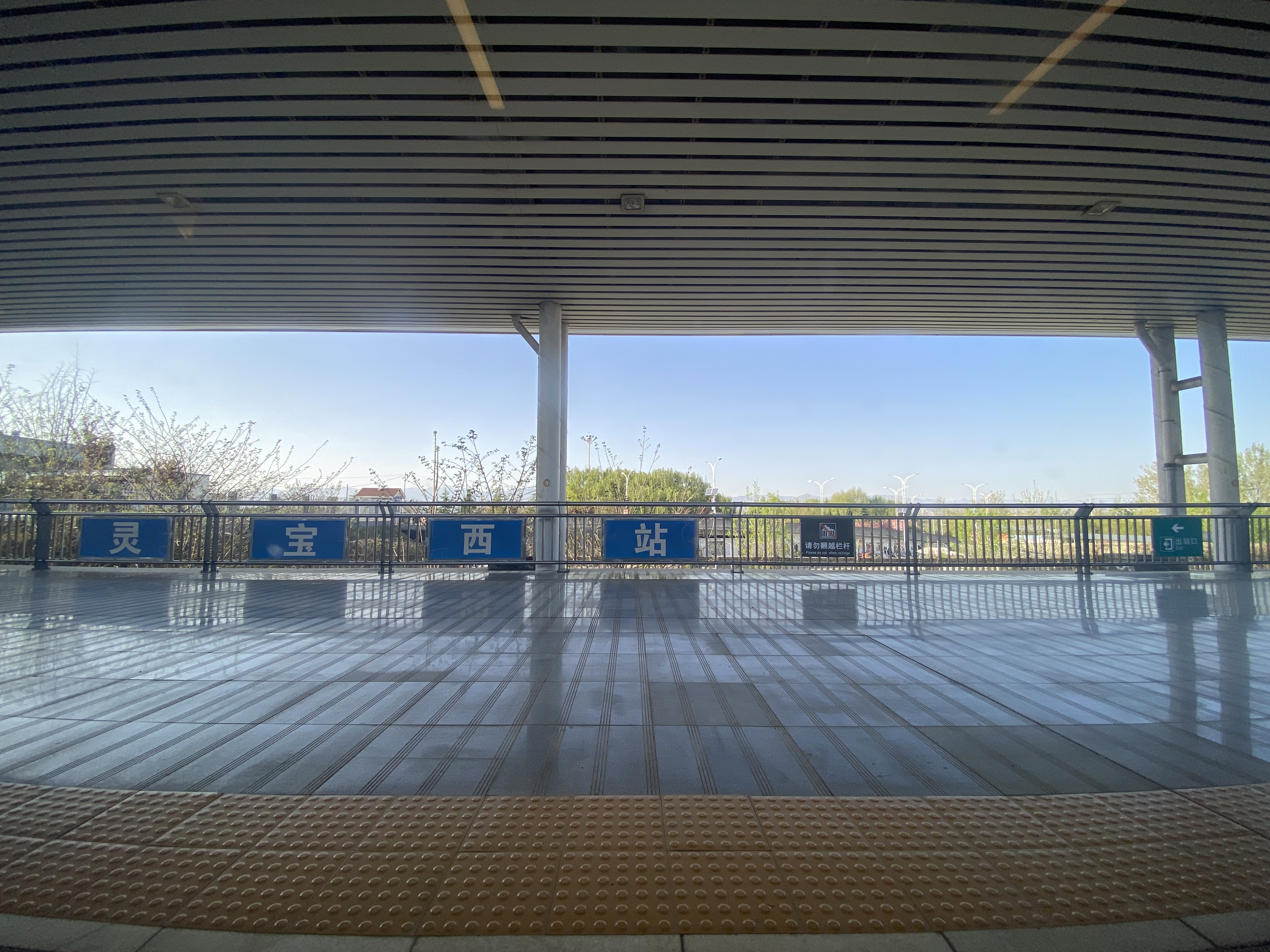

General information
- Other names: Lingbao West
- Location: Lingbao City, Sanmenxia, Henan; China
- Coordinates: 34°34′39.54″N 110°41′1.60″E
- Operated by: CR Zhengzhou
- Line: Zhengzhou-Xi'an high-speed railway

Other information
- Station code: TMIS code: 39044; Telegraph code: LPF; Pinyin code: LBX
- Classification: 3rd-class station

History
- Opened: 6 February 2010
Location

The Lingbao West railway station (Chinese: 灵宝西站) is a railway station of Zhengxi Passenger Railway located in Lingbao City, Henan, China. The station was among the eight new passenger stations and one passing stations commissioned for the Zhengzhou‒Xi’an Railway project. Construction for this project reportedly commenced on 25 September 2005. Trial operations reportedly started on 28 December 2009, and commencement of commercial operations on 6 February 2010.

The station building has received criticism for its appearance. It has been listed by Hong Kong–based English language news media publishing group Asia Times as an “undisputed eyesore“.

The station is serviced by the G-train on the Xuzhou–Lanzhou High-Speed Railway. Departing from Xuzhou to Lanzhou, it is preceded by the station of Sanmenxia South, and followed by the Huashan North station.

Preceding station	China Railway High-speed	Following station
Sanmenxia South towards Zhengzhou	Zhengzhou–Xi'an high-speed railway Part of the Eurasia Continental Bridge corridor	Huashan North towards Xi'an North
