= WBY =

WBY may refer to:

- WBY, the National Rail station code for West Byfleet railway station, Surrey, England
- WBY, the Telegraph code for Weinan North railway station, Shaanxi, China
