= Mianchi South railway station =

Railway station in Henan, China

Coordinates: 34.6863°N 111.7683°E

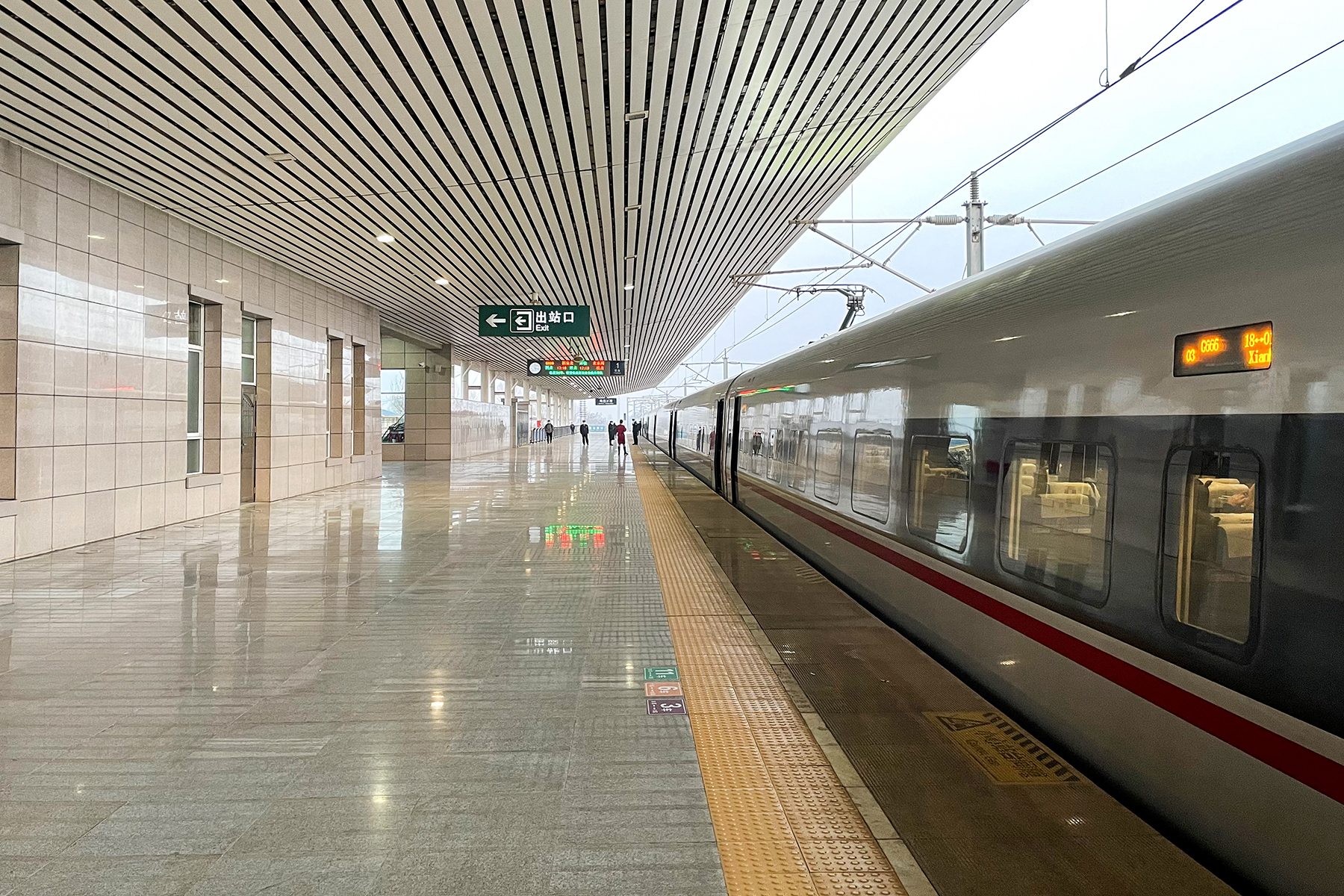
Mianchi South railway station

Mianchi South railway station (Chinese: 渑池南站) is a railway station located in Mianchi County, Henan, China. It was opened on 6 February 2010, along with the Zhengzhou–Xi'an high-speed railway.

Preceding station	China Railway High-speed	Following station
Luoyang Longmen towards Zhengzhou	Zhengzhou–Xi'an high-speed railway Part of the Eurasia Continental Bridge corridor	Sanmenxia South towards Xi'an North
