= Sanmenxia South railway station =

Railway station in Sanmenxia, China

Sanmenxianan 三门峡南
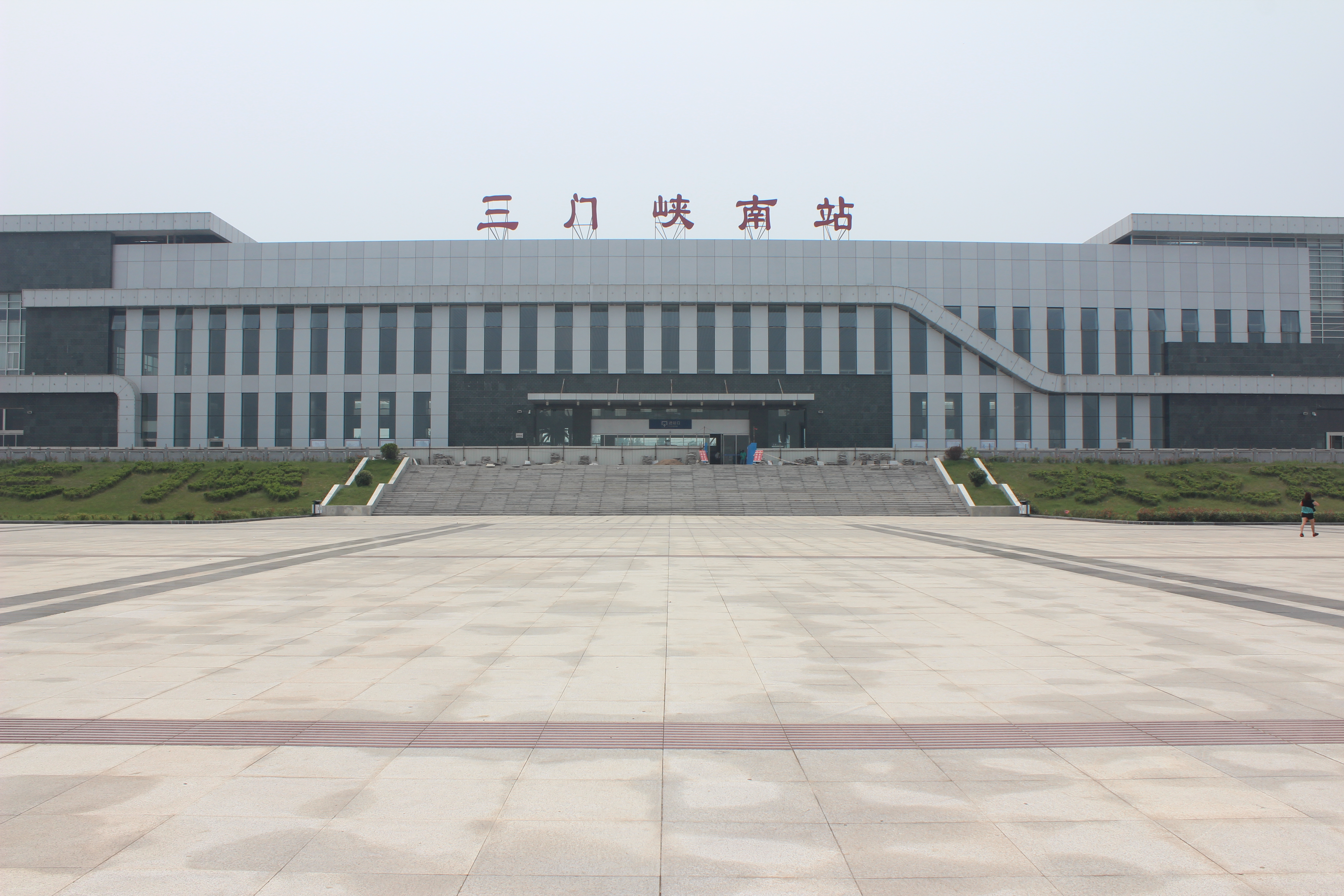

General information
- Other names: Sanmenxia South
- Location: Shanzhou District, Sanmenxia, Henan; China
- Coordinates: 34.7496°N 111.1542°E
- Operated by: CR Zhengzhou
- Line(s): Xuzhou–Lanzhou High-Speed Railway

Other information
- Station code: TMIS code: 39047; Telegraph code: SCF; Pinyin code: SMN
- Classification: 1st class station

History
- Opened: 6 February 2010

The Sanmenxia South railway station (Chinese: 三门峡南站) is a railway station located in Sanmenxia, Henan, China. It was opened on 6 February 2010, along with the Zhengzhou–Xi'an high-speed railway.

| Preceding station | China Railway High-speed | Following station |
|---|---|---|
| Mianchi South towards Zhengzhou | Zhengzhou–Xi'an high-speed railway Part of the Eurasia Continental Bridge corridor | Lingbao West towards Xi'an North |
