= Lintong East railway station =

Railway station in Xi'an, China

Coordinates: 34°26′0.44″N 109°15′3.53″E

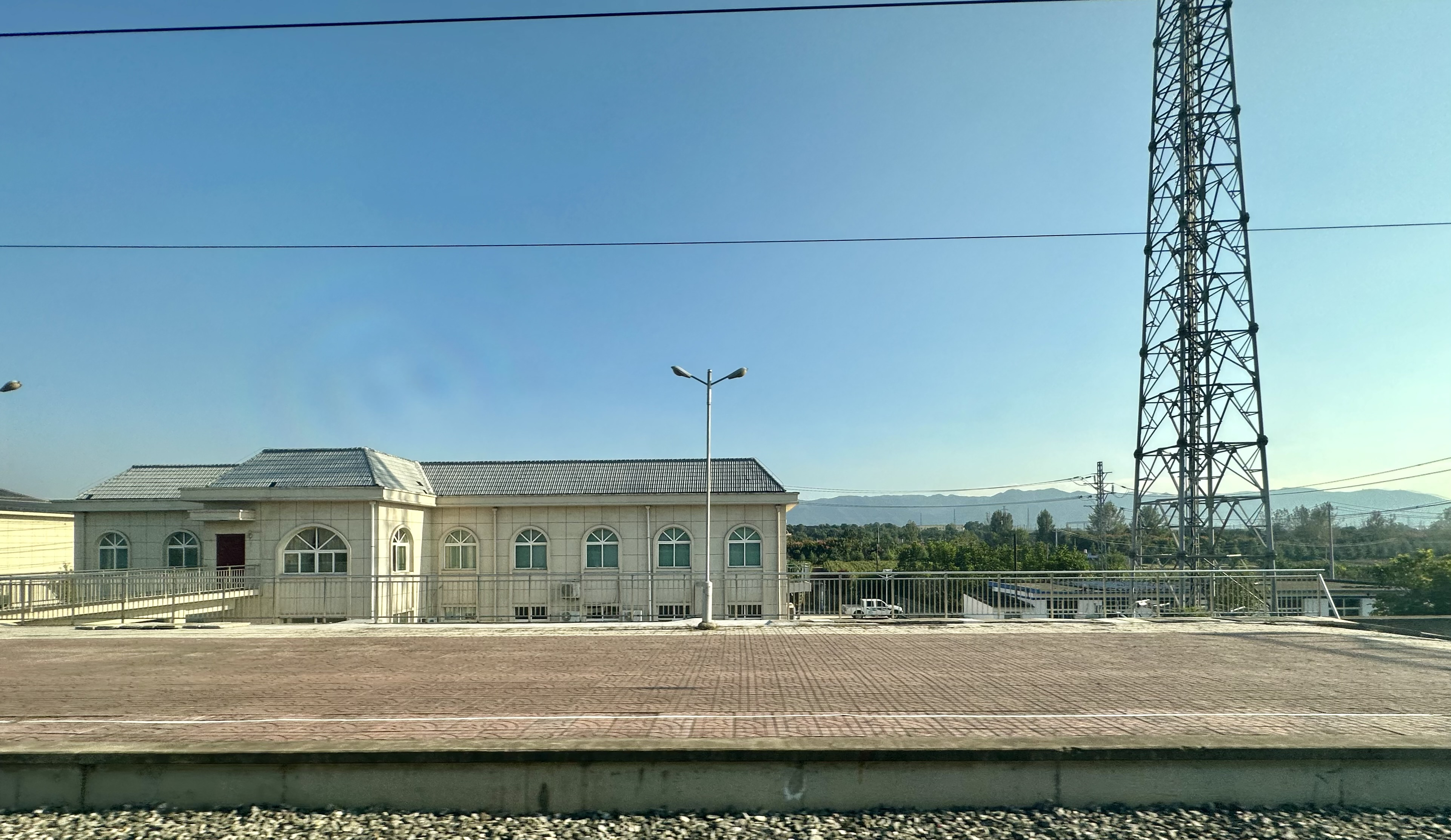
Lintong East Railway Station

The Lintong East railway station is a railway station of Zhengxi Passenger Railway located in Lintong District, Xi'an, Shaanxi, China. The station is currently not in operation.
