= Weinan railway station =

Railway station in Weinan, China

Weinan 渭南
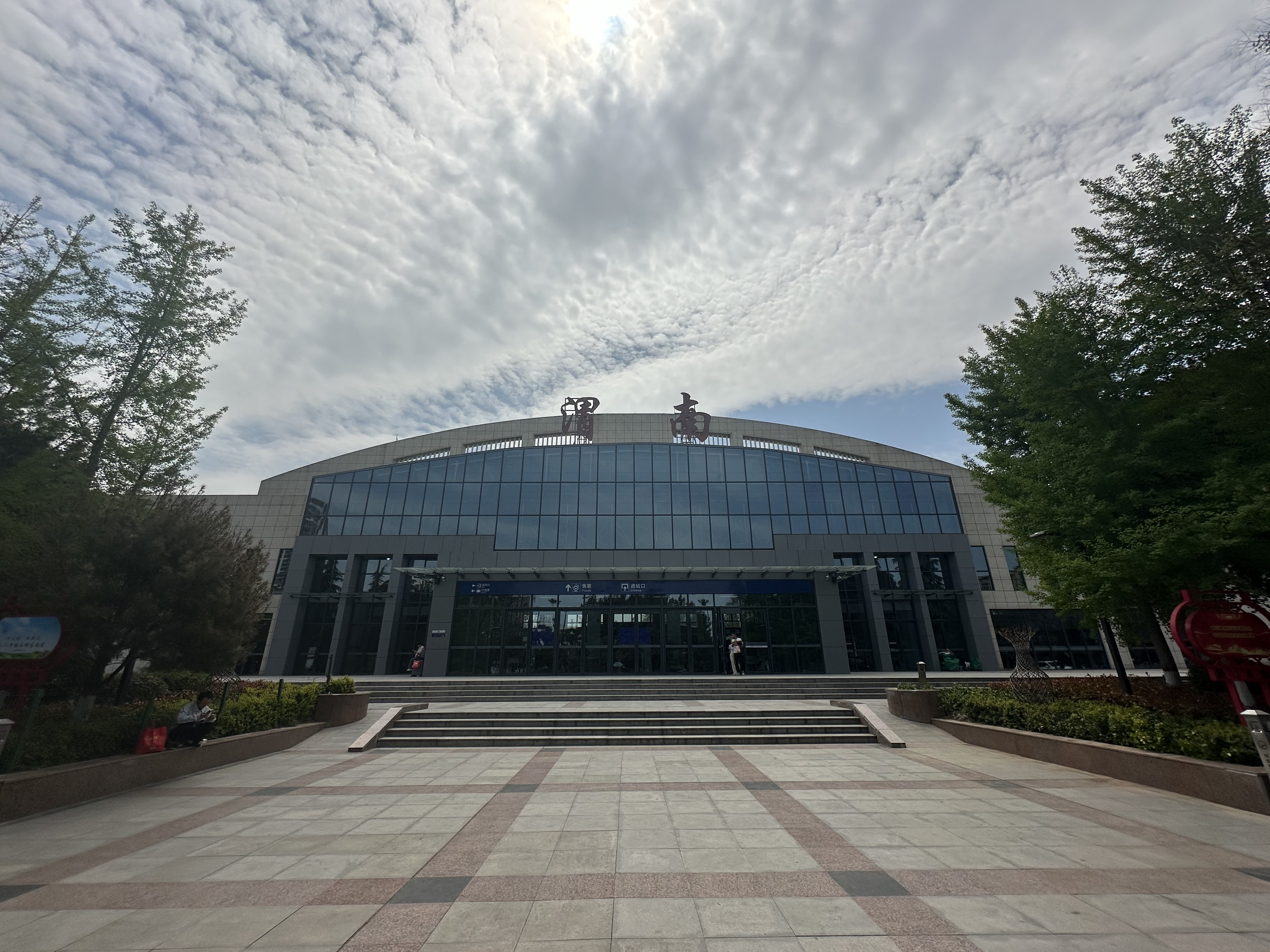
- Weinan Railway Station in 2024

General information
- Location: Qianjin Lu; Linwei District, Weinan, Shaanxi; China
- Coordinates: 34.484309°N 109.494081°E
- Operator: CR Xi'an
- Lines: Longhai Railway; Xi'an Railway Hub
- Platforms: 3 (1 side platform and 1 island platform)
- Tracks: 8

Other information
- Station code: 39389 (TMIS code); WNY (telegraph code); WNA (Pinyin code)
- Classification: Class 1 station (一等站)

History
- Opened: 1934

Services
Preceding station	China Railway	Following station
Huashan towards Lianyungang East	Longhai railway	Xi'an towards Lanzhou
Location

The Weinan Railway Station (Chinese: 渭南站) is a railway station of Longhai Railway located in Linwei District of Weinan city in Shaanxi province, China. The station was opened on 1 July 1934. In 1958, the Station was relocated to Qianjin Road. The old building now functions as a cargo station.

== History ==
The Station was built after the Northern Expedition. In 1934, the Nanjing-based Republican government took control of construction and extended the Longhai Railway further west from Tongguan via Weinan to Xi'an.

During the Xi'an Incident, the station was heavily damaged due to Air Force bombings sent by He Yingqin.

In 1958, the Station was relocated to Qianjin Road. The old building was repurposed into a cargo station.

== Trains ==
The Weinan Station has trains to almost all major Chinese cities.

Due to the opening of high-speed railways and the Weinan North railway station, the frequency of trains at Weinan Station has reduced.
