= Huashan North railway station =

Railway station in Weinan, Shaanxi, China

Huashanbei 华山北
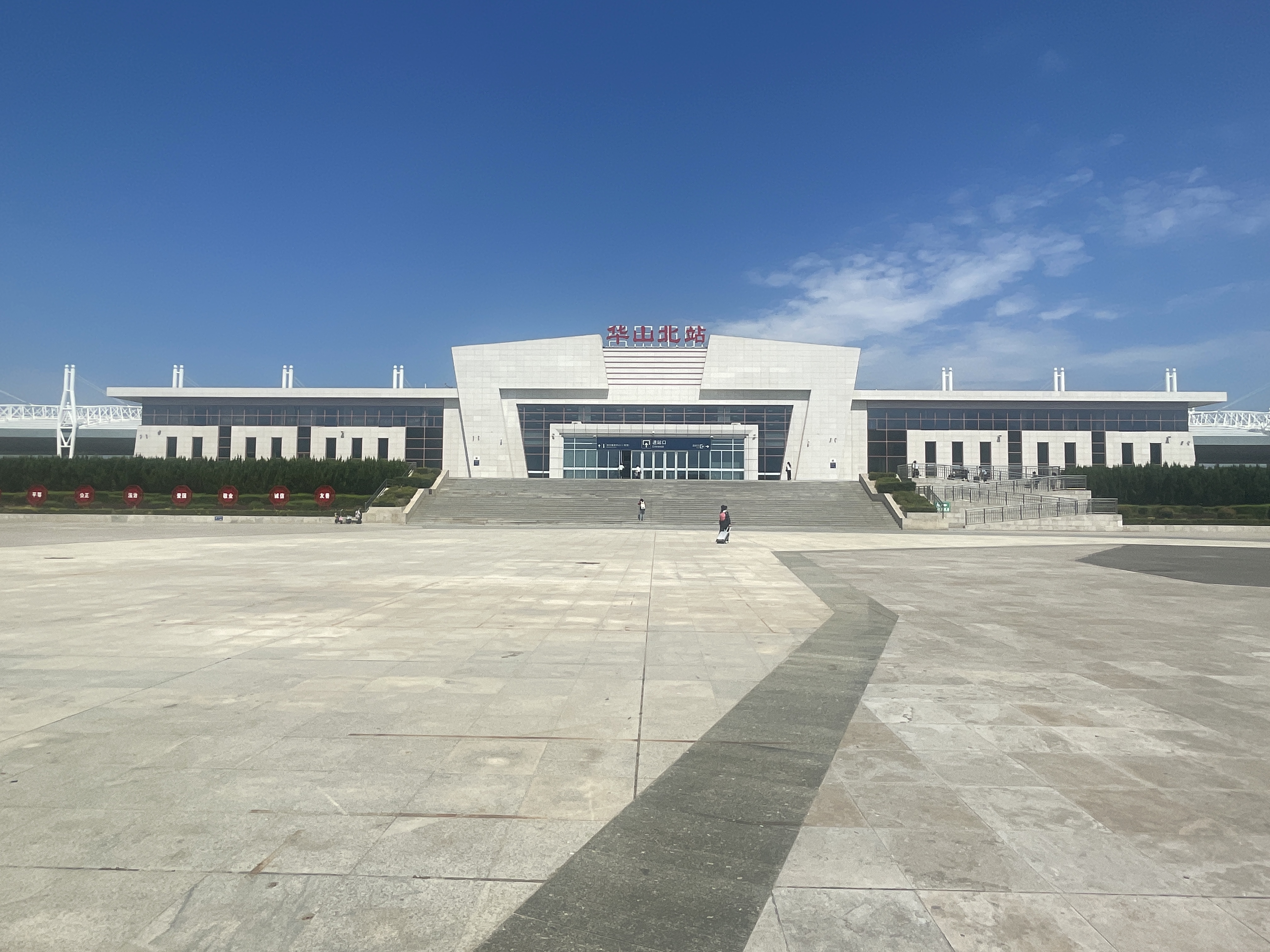
- Huashan North railway station

General information
- Other names: Huashanbei railway station
- Location: Huayin, Weinan, Shaanxi; China
- Coordinates: 34°35′1.34″N 110°5′36.27″E
- Operated by: Xi'an Railway Bureau, China Railway Corporation
- Line: Zhengzhou–Xi'an High-Speed Railway

History
- Opened: 6 February 2010
- Previous names: New Huashan railway station
Location

The Huashan North railway station (Chinese: 华山北站) is a railway station located in Huayin, Weinan, Shaanxi, China. There is 5 km from Mount Hua spots, travel bus from there can take you to Huashan visitor center. It was opened on 6 February 2010, along with the Zhengzhou–Xi'an high-speed railway.

Preceding station	China Railway High-speed	Following station
Lingbao West towards Zhengzhou	Zhengzhou–Xi'an high-speed railway Part of the Eurasia Continental Bridge corridor	Weinan North towards Xi'an North
