= Yongji North railway station =

Railway station in Yongji, Shanxi, China

Coordinates: 35.0276°N 110.4248°E

Yongji North 永济北站
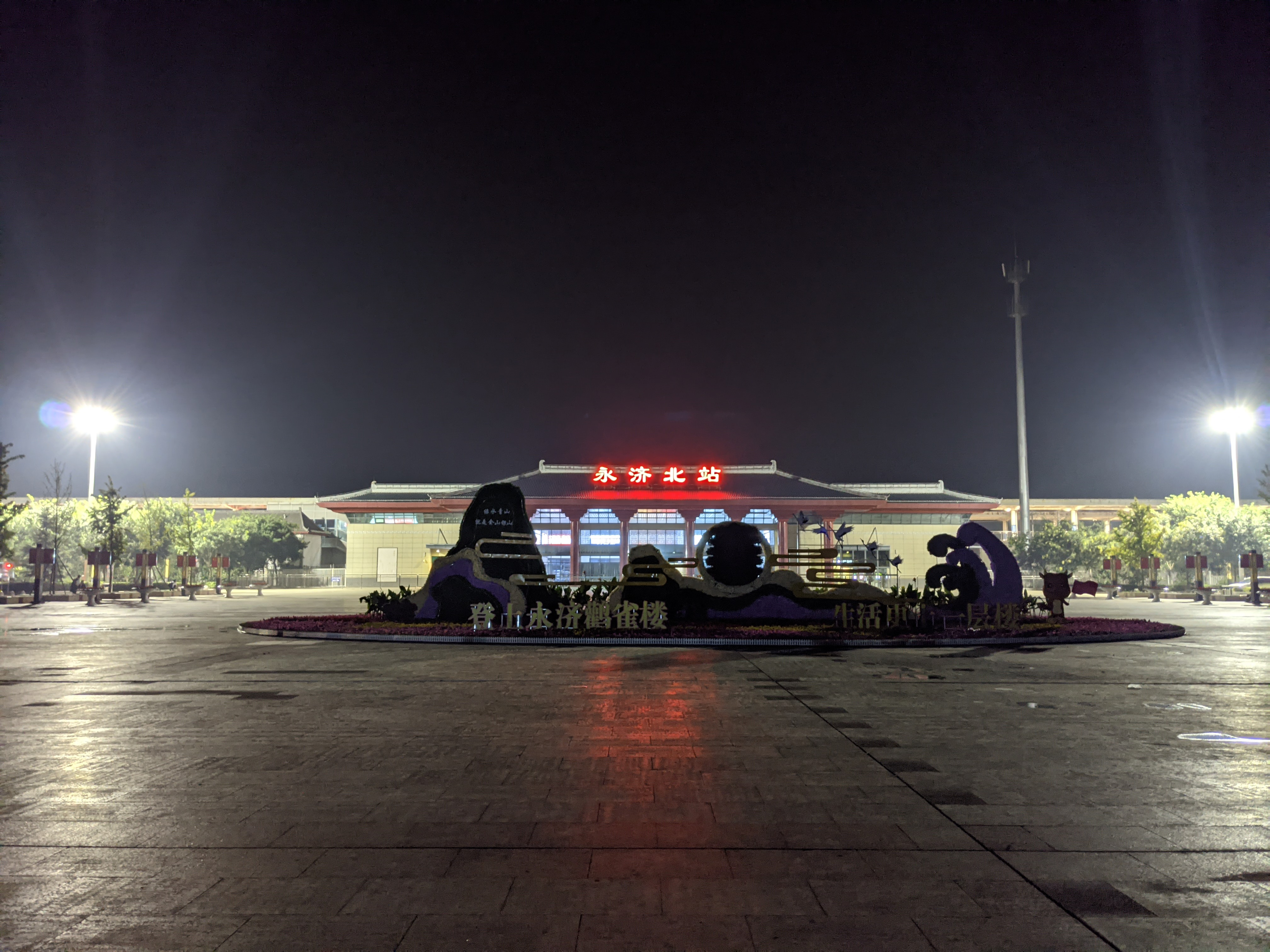

General information
- Location: Yongji, Shanxi; China
- Line: Datong–Xi'an Passenger Railway
- Platforms: 2

History
- Opened: 1 July 2014; 11 years ago

The Yongji North railway station (Chinese: 永济北站) is a railway station of Datong–Xi'an Passenger Railway located in Yongji, Shanxi, China. It started operation on 1 July 2014, together with the Railway.

Preceding station	China Railway High-speed	Following station
Yuncheng North towards Datong South	Datong–Xi'an high-speed railway	Dali towards Xi'an North
