= Yuncheng North railway station =

Railway station in Yuncheng, China

Yunchengbei 运城北
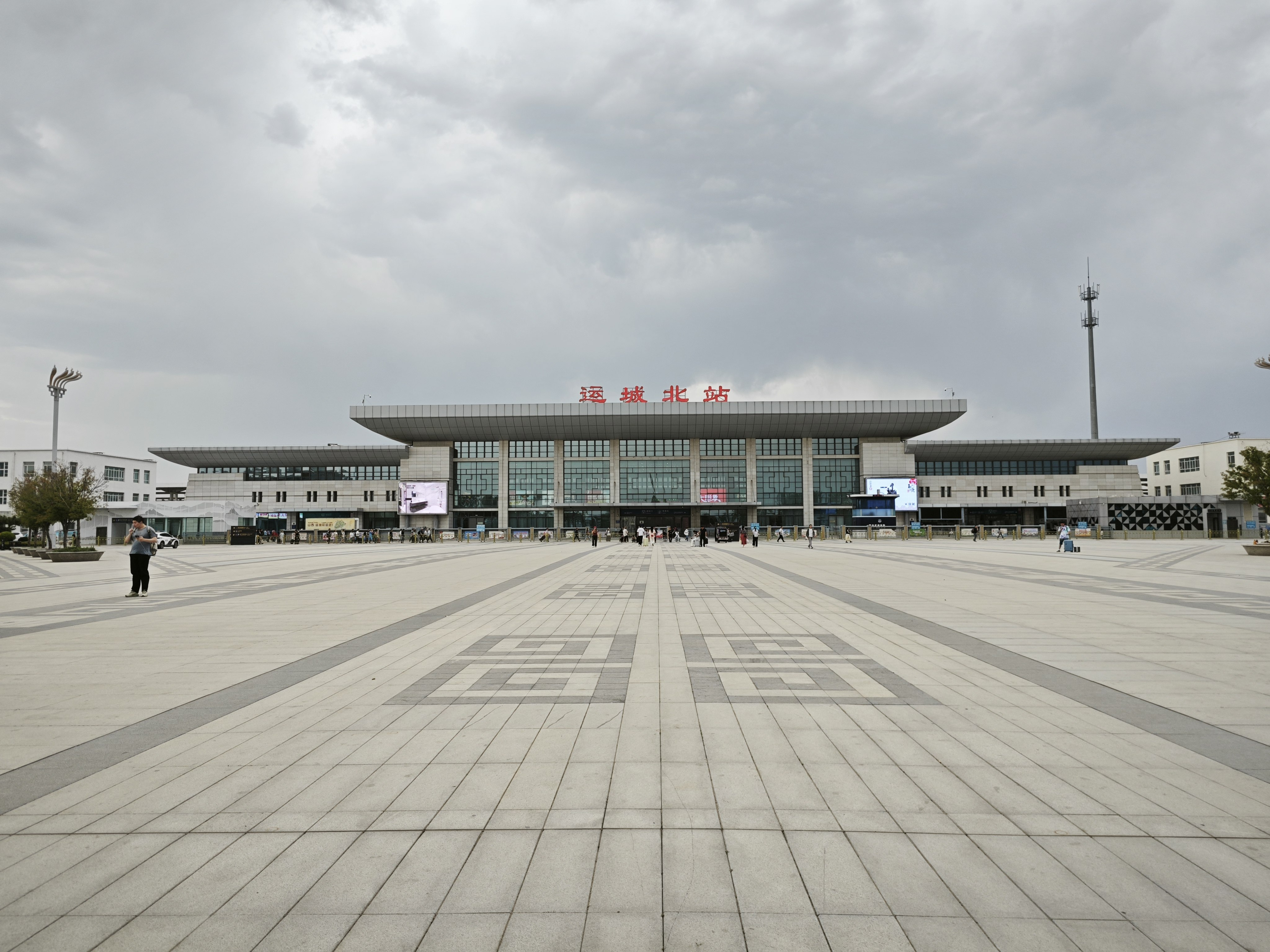

General information
- Other names: Yuncheng North
- Coordinates: 35°05′59″N 110°58′42″E
- Operator: CR Taiyuan

Other information
- Station code: 26497 (TMIS)

History
- Opened: 1 July 2014; 12 years ago
Location

The Yuncheng North railway station (Chinese: 运城北站) is a railway station of Datong–Xi'an Passenger Railway located in Yuncheng, Shanxi, China. It started operation on 1 July 2014, together with the railway.

Preceding station	China Railway High-speed	Following station
Wenxi West towards Datong South	Datong–Xi'an high-speed railway	Yongji North towards Xi'an North
