= Weinan North railway station =

Railway station in Weinan, China

Weinan North 渭南北站
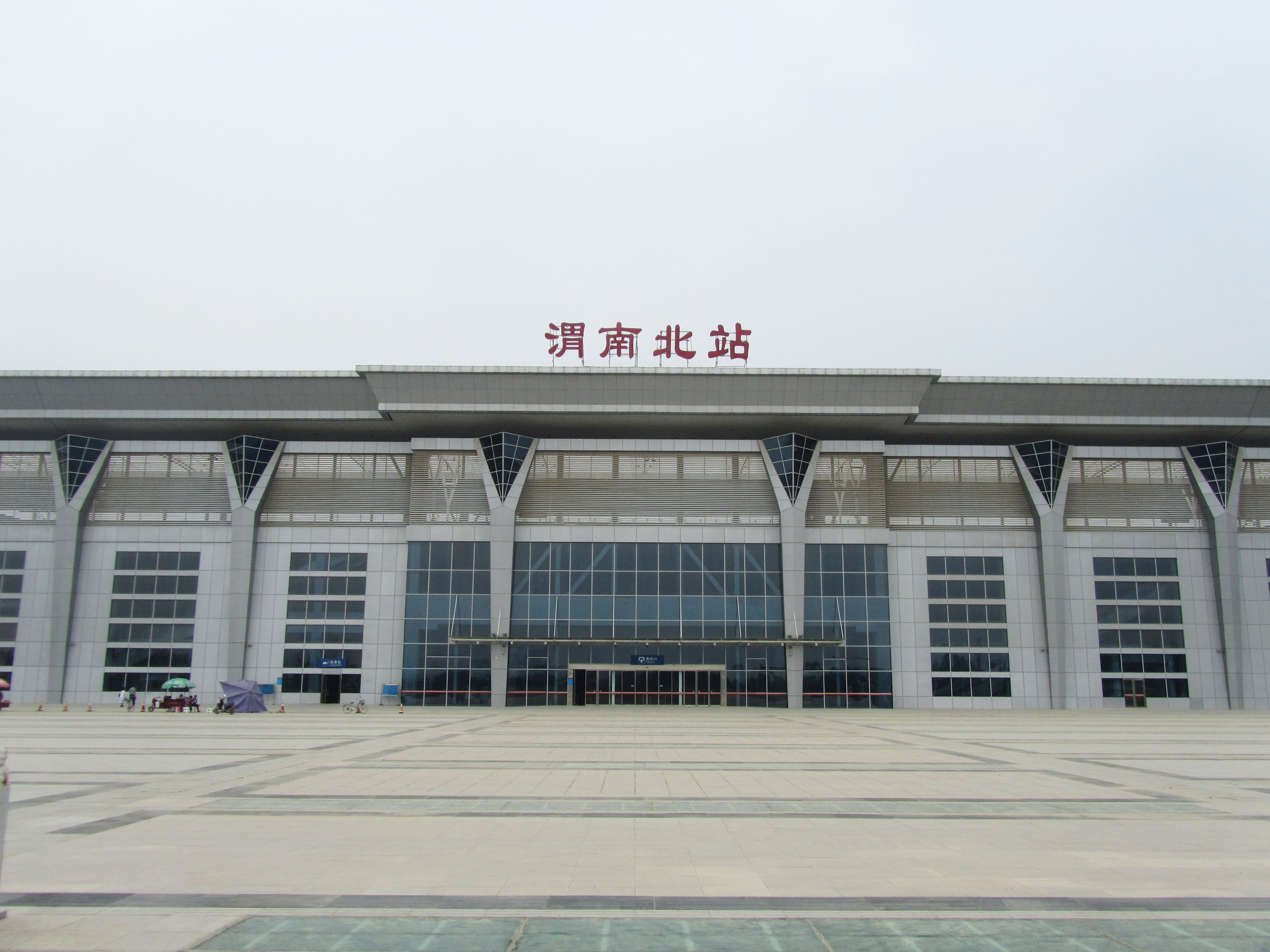

General information
- Other names: Weinanbei railway station
- Location: Cangcheng Lu, Linwei District, Weinan, Shaanxi; China
- Coordinates: 34.536152°N 109.481378°E
- Operated by: Xi'an Railway Bureau, China Railway Corporation
- Line(s): Zhengzhou–Xi'an High-Speed Railway, Datong–Xi'an Passenger Railway
- Platforms: 4

Other information
- Station code: TMIS code: 39038; Telegraph code: WBY; Pinyin code: WNB
- Classification: 1st class station

History
- Opened: 6 February 2010; 15 years ago
- Previous names: New Weinan railway station

The Weinan North railway station (Chinese: 渭南北站) is a railway station of Zhengzhou–Xi'an High-Speed Railway and Datong–Xi'an Passenger Railway located in Linwei District of Weinan city in Shaanxi province, China.

== Name ==
The station during construction was called New Weinan railway station (Chinese: 新渭南站) but following its completion it was renamed Weinan North railway station, in accordance with its location.

== Service ==
The station is located on the north end of the Cangcheng Road, just on the south side of the Wei River. The station itself is part of the world third longest bridge Weinan Weihe Grand Bridge. It was opened on 6 February 2010, along with the Zhengzhou–Xi'an high-speed railway. On 1 July 2014, with the completion Datong–Xi'an Passenger Railway, the station is served by two high speed railway lines.

There are more than 60 trains serve the station daily, making it the most important railway hub in eastern part of Shaanxi province. The trains connect Weinan with major Chinese cities like Beijing, Changsha, Guangzhou, Shanghai, Shenzhen, Taiyuan, Wuhan, Xi'an and Zhengzhou.

The station is a major transportation point in the Weinan city, several local bus lines connect the station with the city proper.

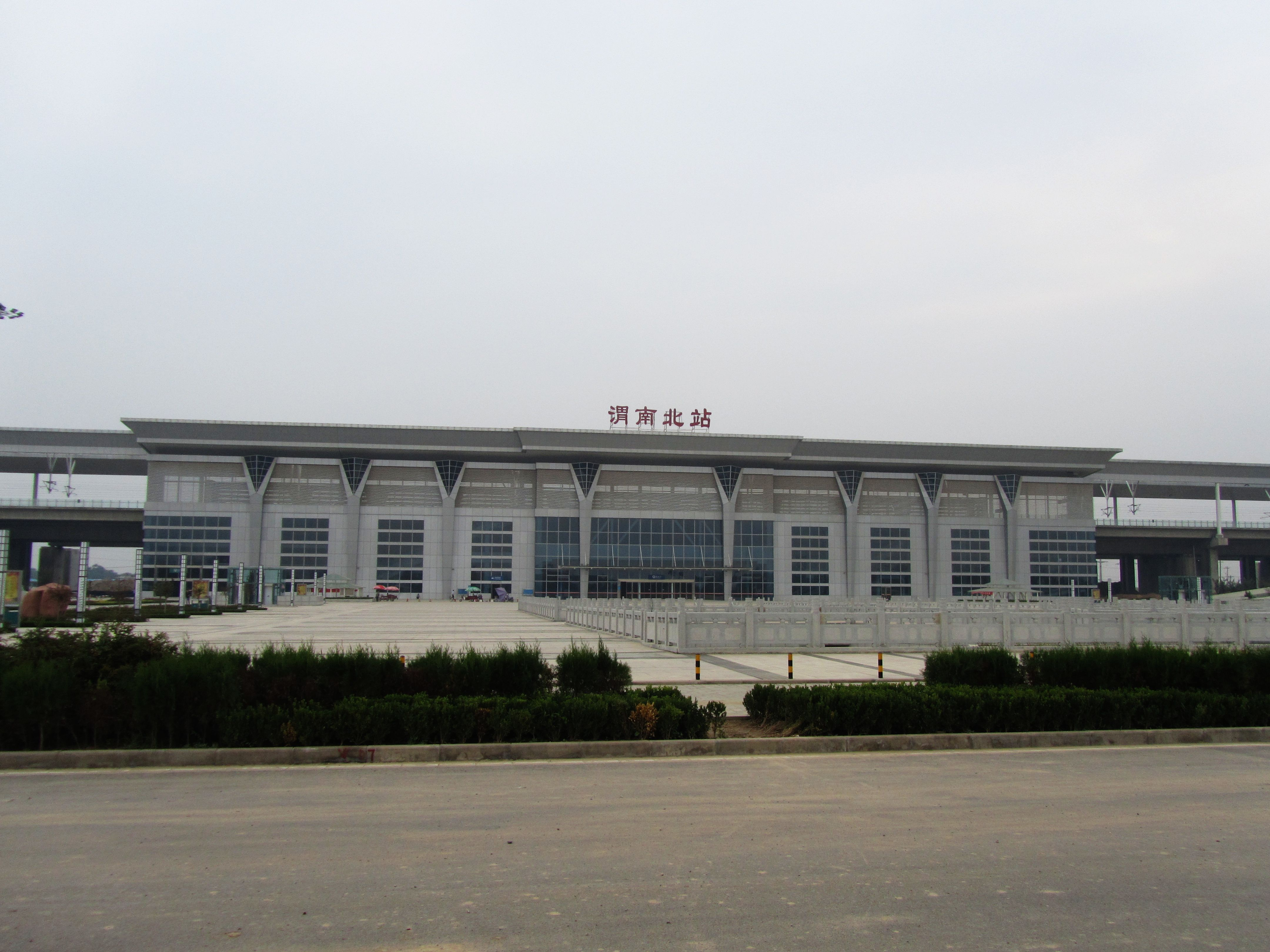
overview

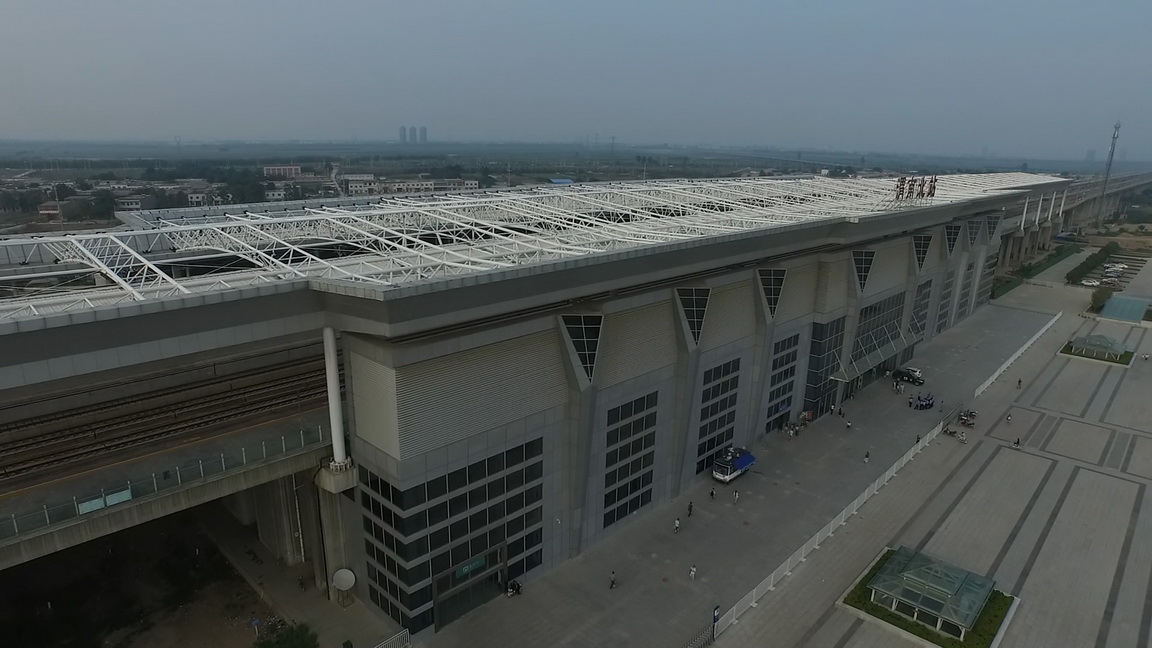
The station from above

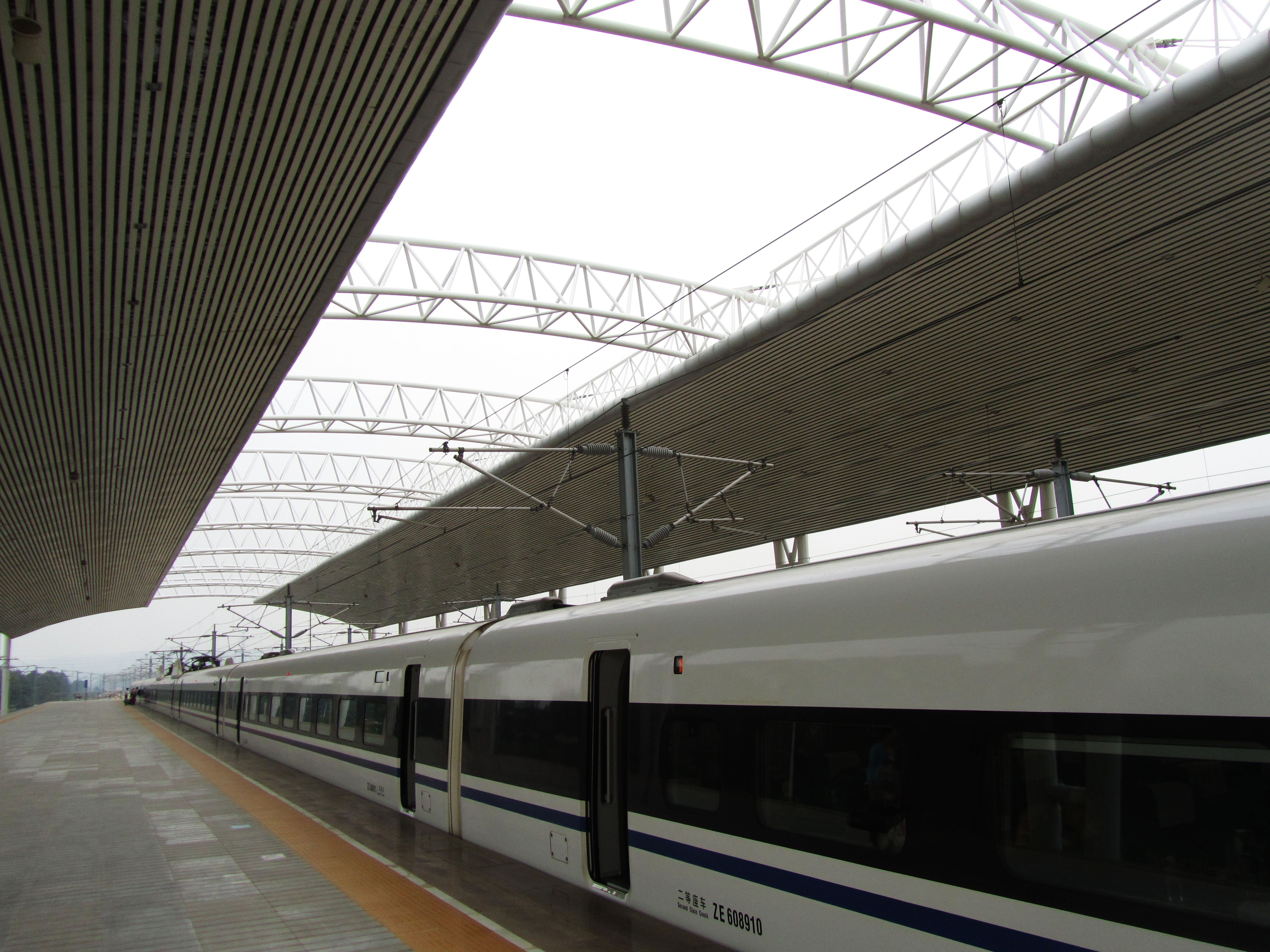
A CRH-train at the platform of the station

== See also ==
- Weinan railway station
- Weinan West railway station

Preceding station	China Railway High-speed	Following station
Huashan North towards Zhengzhou	Zhengzhou–Xi'an high-speed railway Part of the Eurasia Continental Bridge corridor	Xi'an North Terminus
Dali towards Datong South	Datong–Xi'an high-speed railway	Xi'an North Terminus
