= Dali railway station (Shaanxi) =

Railway station in Weinan, Shaanxi, China

Coordinates: 34.8356°N 109.9208°E

Dali 大荔
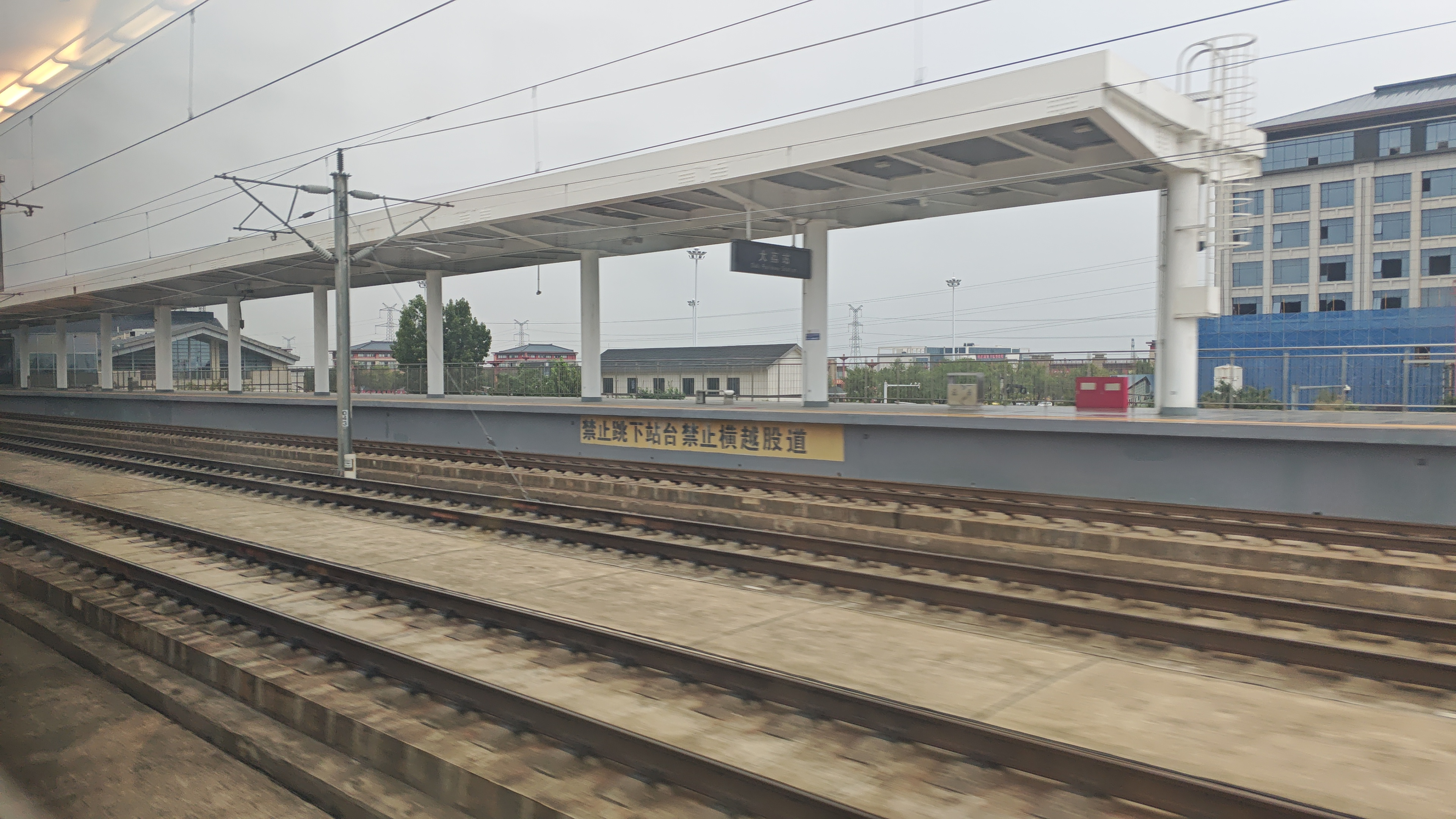

General information
- Location: Dali County, Weinan, Shaanxi; China
- Line: Datong–Xi'an high-speed railway
- Platforms: 2

History
- Opened: 1 July 2014; 12 years ago
Location

Dali railway station (Chinese: 大荔站; pinyin: Dàlì zhàn) is a railway station of Datong–Xi'an high-speed railway located in Dali County, Weinan, Shaanxi, China. The station began operations on 1 July 2014, together with the railway. The old Dali railway station on Xi'an–Hancheng railway was then renamed to Dali North railway station.

Preceding station	China Railway High-speed	Following station
Yongji North towards Datong South	Datong–Xi'an high-speed railway	Weinan North towards Xi'an North
