= Weinan Normal University =

University in Weinan, Shaanxi, China

- 渭南师范学院
- Former name: Weinan Teachers' College
- Type: Public university
- Established: 1923
- President: Zhang Jinan
- Location: Weinan, Shaanxi, China
- Website: http://en.wnu.edu.cn//

Weinan Normal University (Chinese: 渭南师范学院) is a university located in Weinan city, Shaanxi province, China. It was established as Chishui Vocational School in 1923. The university is entitled to grant bachelor's degrees and jointly trains post-graduates of master's and doctoral levels. Presently, it has 61 undergraduate majors in ten different disciplines, including economics, law, education, literature, history, science, technology, management science, art, and agriculture. There are 11 schools and two institutions of International Exchanges and Further Education. It enrolls students nationwide. The number of full-time students, exchange students from Hong Kong, Macao, and Taiwan, and overseas students from South Korea, and Thailand reaches 17,000 in total number. The university is composed of three districts, Chaoyang, Xiyue, and Hanma, covering 650,000 square meters. Apart from 25 academic databases, the accessibility to 1,890,000 copies of books and 43,500 electronic books makes the library a good place to study and do research. Currently, the value of advanced teaching and research facilities totals RMB 1.5 billion.
