= Linwei District =

Coordinates: 34°30′N 109°30′E

Linwei 临渭区
- District
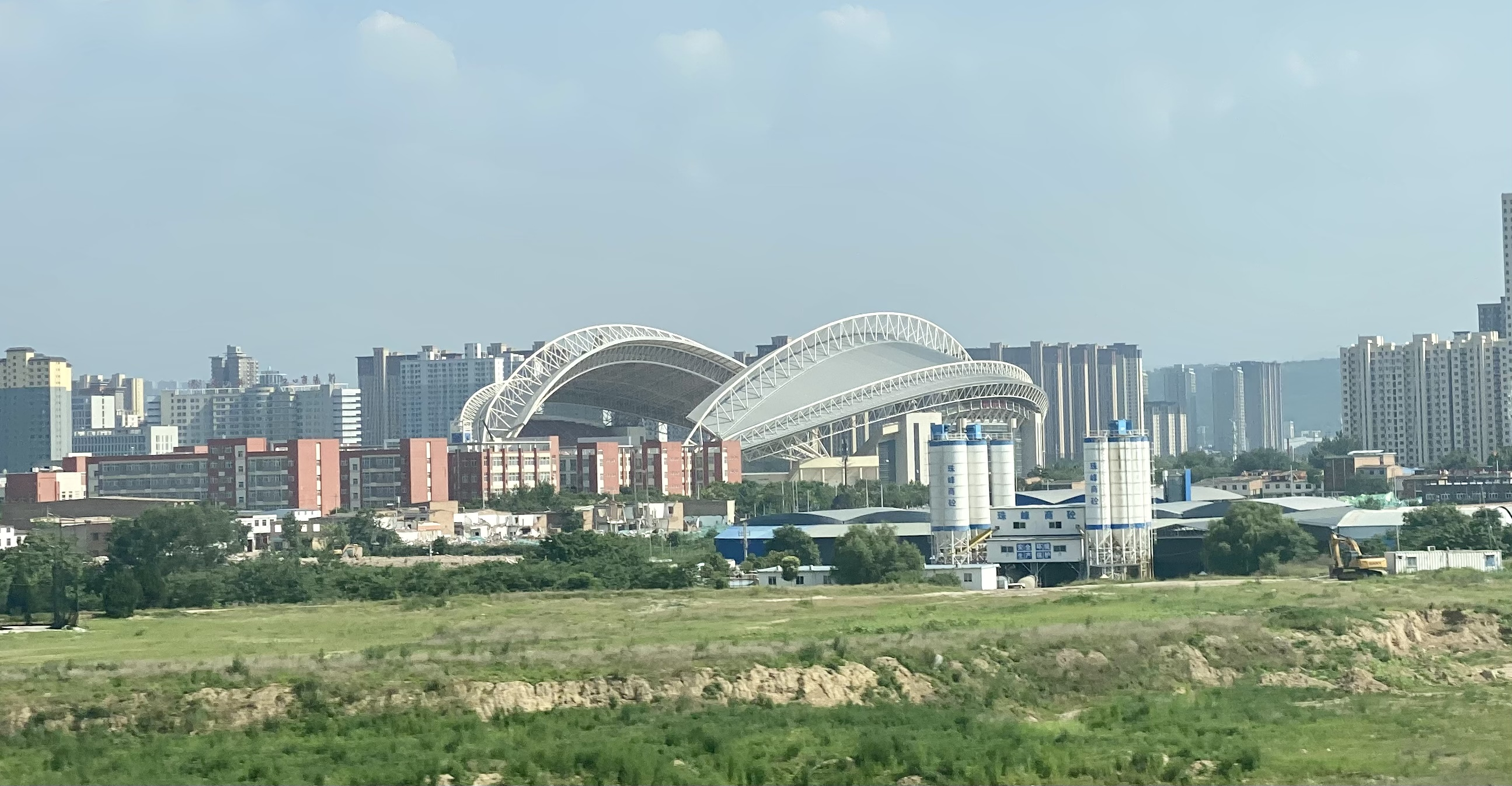
- Interactive map of Linwei
- Country: People's Republic of China
- Province: Shaanxi
- Prefecture-level city: Weinan

Area
  - Total: 1,221 km^{2} (471 sq mi)

Population (2018)
  - Total: 912,100
  - Density: 747.0/km^{2} (1,935/sq mi)
- Time zone: UTC+8 (China standard time)
- Postal Code: 714000

Linwei District (simplified Chinese: 临渭区; traditional Chinese: 臨渭區; pinyin: Línwèi Qū), is a district of the city of Weinan, Shaanxi province, China. The district was established in 1995, renamed from the county-level Weinan city. It is the location of Weinan Normal University, the High-Speed Weinan North Railway Station and the main Weinan Railway Station. From 1995 to 2016, it was the only district of Weinan city.

== Administrative divisions ==
Linwei District has nine subdistricts and sixteen towns.

Subdistrict:

- Duqiao (杜桥街道)
- Xiangyang (向阳街道)
- Renmin (人民街道)
- Jiefang (解放街道)
- Zhannan (站南街道)
- Shuangwang (双王街道)
- Liangtian (良田街道)
- Chongye Road (崇业路街道)
- Baiyang (白杨街道)

Towns:

- Xiagui (下邽镇)
- Gushi (故市镇)
- Qiaonan (桥南镇)
- Yangguo (阳郭镇)
- Lindian (蔺店镇)
- Xiaoyi (孝义镇)
- Xinshi (辛市镇)
- Jiaoxie (交歇镇)
- Sanzhang (三张镇)
- Chongning (崇凝镇)
- Guanlu (官路镇)
- Guandi (官底镇)
- Yancun (阎村镇)
- Fengyuan (丰原镇)
- Guandao (官道镇)
- Longbei (龙背镇)

== Links ==
- Linwei District Government's official website
