= Weinan Weihe Grand Bridge =

Railway bridge in China

Coordinates: 34.548167°N 109.573806°E

The Weinan Weihe Grand Bridge (Chinese: 渭南渭河特大桥) is a part of the Zhengzhou–Xi'an High-Speed Railway which connects Zhengzhou and Xi'an, in China. The 79.732-kilometer (49.543 mi)-long bridge crosses the Wei River twice, as well as many other rivers, such as the Ling river, Luofu river, Xi river, Shi Di river and many more, highways and railways. Upon its completion, it was the longest bridge in the world, but surpassed by two new bridges on Beijing–Shanghai High-Speed Railway that completed in 2010.

The bridge was completed in 2008 but the railway line itself did not open until February 6, 2010. It is now the 3rd longest bridge in the world.

During construction of the Weinan Weihe Grand Bridge, there were at least 10,000 workers 2,300,000 cubic meters of concrete and 45,000 tons of steel.

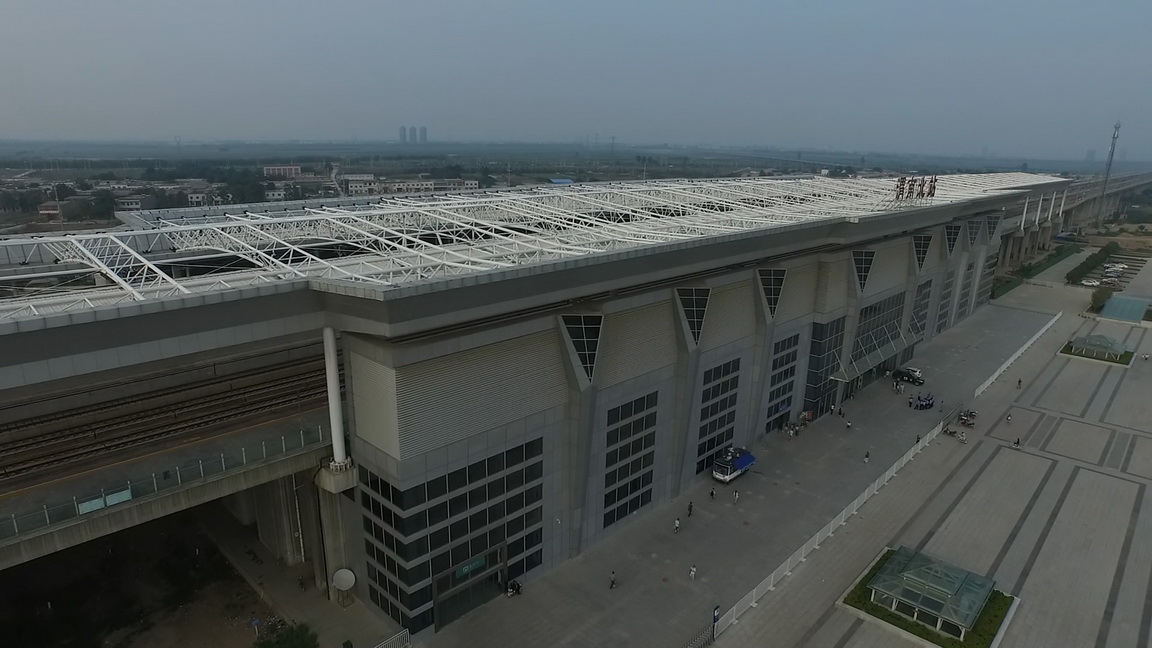
Weinan North Railway Station, part of the Grand Bridge

== See also ==
- List of bridges by length
