= Chengcheng County =

Chengcheng County 澄城县
- County
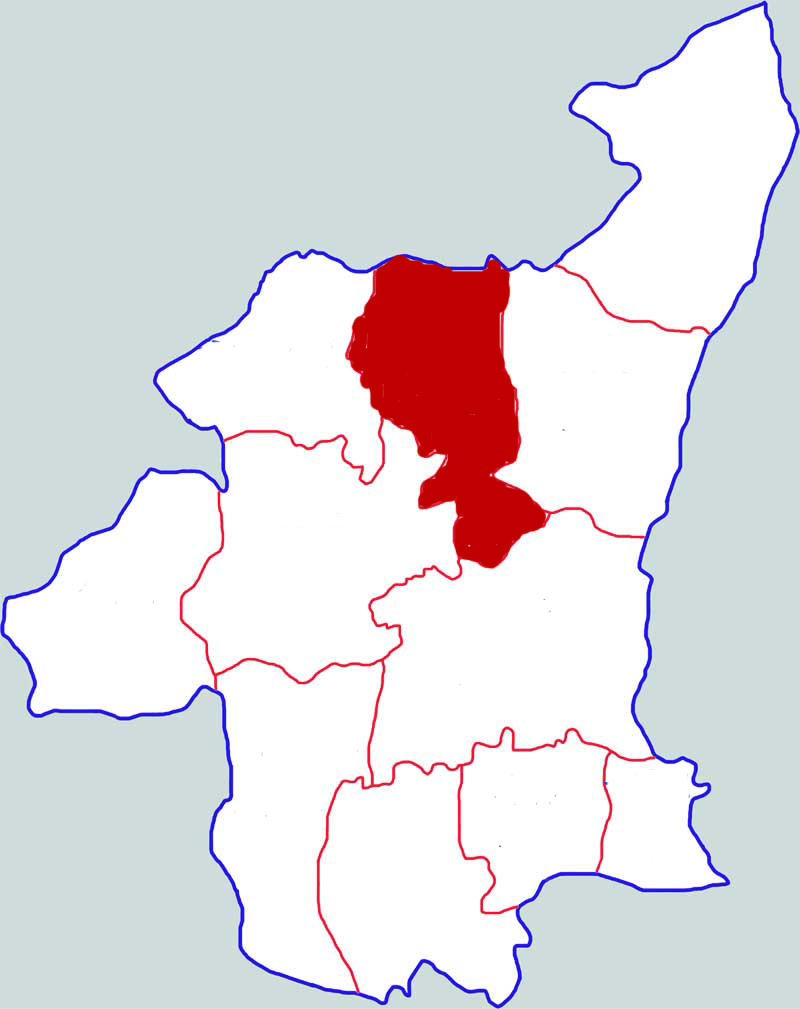
- Location in Weinan

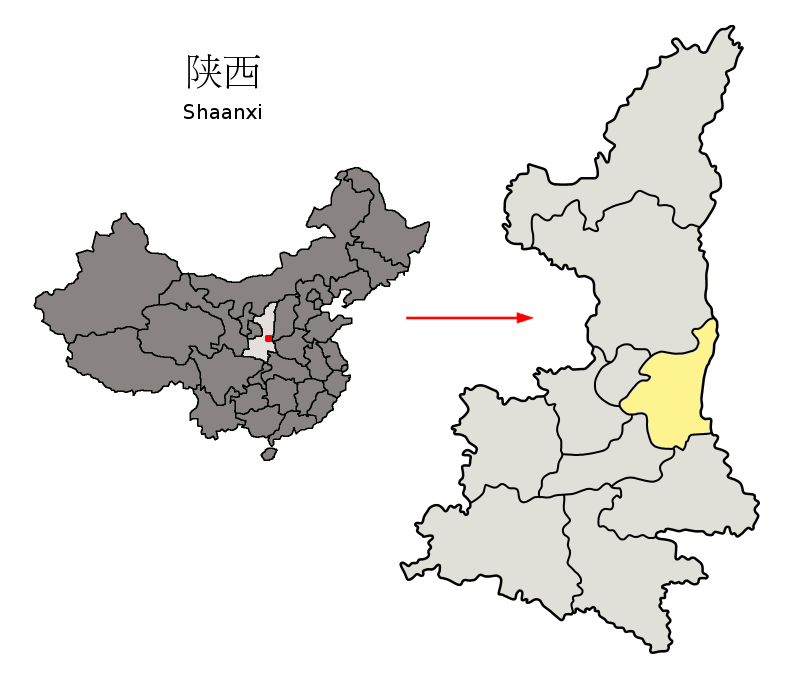
- Weinan in Shaanxi
- Coordinates: 35.275°N 109.814°E
- Country: People's Republic of China
- Province: Shaanxi
- Prefecture-level city: Weinan

Area
  - Total: 1,121 km^{2} (433 sq mi)

Population (2017)
  - Total: 393,224
  - Density: 350.8/km^{2} (908.5/sq mi)
- Time zone: UTC+8 (China standard time)
- Postal Code: 715200
- Area code: (0)913
- Licence plates: 陕E
- Website: www.chengcheng.gov.cn

Chengcheng County (Chinese: 澄城县; pinyin: Chéngchéng Xiàn) is a county under the administration of the prefecture-level city of Weinan, in the central part of Shaanxi province, China. The county lies in the Guanzhong Plain, which has a population of about 390,000.

== Administrative divisions ==
As of 2019, Chengcheng County is divided to 1 subdistrict and 9 towns.

Subdistricts

- Chengguan Sudistrict (城关街道)

Towns

- Fengyuan (冯原镇)
- Wangzhuang (王庄镇)
- Yaotou (尧头镇)
- Zhaozhuang (赵庄镇)
- Jiaodao (交道镇)
- Siqian (寺前镇)
- Weizhuang (韦庄镇)
- Anli (安里镇)
- Zhuangtou (庄头镇)

== Climate ==
Climate data for Chengcheng, elevation 679 m (2,228 ft), (1991–2020 normals, extremes 1981–2010)
Month	Jan	Feb	Mar	Apr	May	Jun	Jul	Aug	Sep	Oct	Nov	Dec	Year
Record high °C (°F)	16.2 (61.2)	21.0 (69.8)	27.7 (81.9)	36.1 (97.0)	36.3 (97.3)	40.0 (104.0)	39.0 (102.2)	37.8 (100.0)	38.0 (100.4)	30.8 (87.4)	23.2 (73.8)	18.4 (65.1)	40.0 (104.0)
Mean daily maximum °C (°F)	4.4 (39.9)	8.5 (47.3)	14.5 (58.1)	21.3 (70.3)	26.1 (79.0)	30.3 (86.5)	31.2 (88.2)	29.4 (84.9)	24.5 (76.1)	18.7 (65.7)	11.9 (53.4)	5.9 (42.6)	18.9 (66.0)
Daily mean °C (°F)	−1.6 (29.1)	2.4 (36.3)	8.3 (46.9)	14.7 (58.5)	19.7 (67.5)	24.2 (75.6)	25.8 (78.4)	24.2 (75.6)	19.2 (66.6)	12.9 (55.2)	6.0 (42.8)	−0.1 (31.8)	13.0 (55.4)
Mean daily minimum °C (°F)	−6.1 (21.0)	−2.3 (27.9)	3.1 (37.6)	8.8 (47.8)	13.6 (56.5)	18.4 (65.1)	21.2 (70.2)	20.0 (68.0)	15.0 (59.0)	8.4 (47.1)	1.5 (34.7)	−4.5 (23.9)	8.1 (46.6)
Record low °C (°F)	−16.2 (2.8)	−13.6 (7.5)	−11.5 (11.3)	−3.0 (26.6)	0.5 (32.9)	8.9 (48.0)	15.1 (59.2)	12.5 (54.5)	3.2 (37.8)	−4.7 (23.5)	−13.4 (7.9)	−17.9 (−0.2)	−17.9 (−0.2)
Average precipitation mm (inches)	5.9 (0.23)	8.1 (0.32)	14.9 (0.59)	29.9 (1.18)	43.0 (1.69)	57.9 (2.28)	91.2 (3.59)	90.7 (3.57)	81.7 (3.22)	46.6 (1.83)	19.0 (0.75)	3.4 (0.13)	492.3 (19.38)
Average precipitation days (≥ 0.1 mm)	3.4	3.5	4.6	6.4	8.1	8.0	10.3	9.3	10.3	8.3	5.3	2.4	79.9
Average snowy days	3.8	3.3	1.5	0.1	0	0	0	0	0	0	1.7	2.8	13.2
Average relative humidity (%)	53	53	51	53	55	57	69	72	73	70	64	55	60
Mean monthly sunshine hours	184.3	175.9	207.6	232.7	249.5	241.6	235.8	217.4	171.2	171.4	171.3	186.2	2,444.9
Percentage possible sunshine	59	57	56	59	57	56	54	53	47	50	56	61	55
Source: China Meteorological Administration
