= Dali County =

Dali County 大荔县 Tali
- County
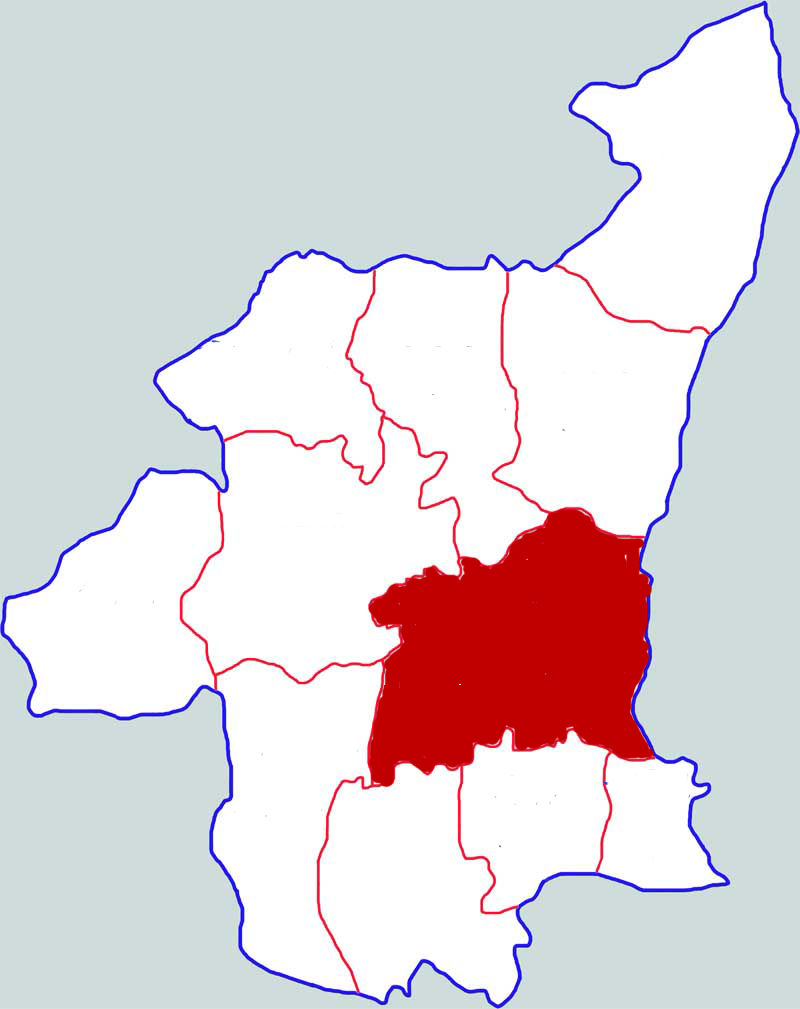
- Location in Weinan

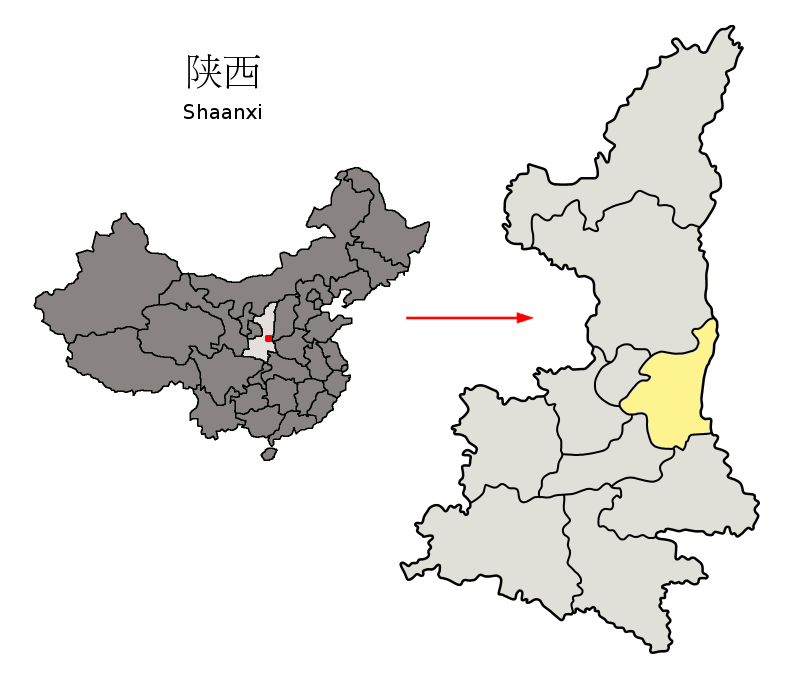
- Weinan in Shaanxi

- Location within China
- Coordinates: 34°47′01″N 109°58′36″E
- Country: People's Republic of China
- Province: Shaanxi
- Prefecture-level city: Weinan

Area
  - Total: 1,800 km^{2} (690 sq mi)

Population (2018)
  - Total: 718,879
  - Density: 400/km^{2} (1,000/sq mi)
- Time zone: UTC+8 (China standard time)
- Postal code: 715100
- Licence plates: 陕E

Dali County (Chinese: 大荔; pinyin: Dàlì) is a county under the administration of the prefecture-level city of Weinan, in the east-central part of Shaanxi province, China, bordering Shanxi province to the east. It covers 1,766 km^{2} (682 sq mi). The population in 2002 was 690 thousand. Its economy focuses on agriculture, mainly yielding cotton and fruits, such as watermelon. Dali was a county dated back to Qin Dynasty. It used to be named as Linjin, Dali, Wuxiang, Fengyi, Tongzhou, etc.

== Administration ==
Dali County governs 18 towns.

Towns

- Chengguan (城关镇)
- Xuzhuang (许庄镇)
- Chaoyi (朝邑镇)
- Anren (安仁镇)
- Fengcun (冯村镇)
- Liangyi (两宜镇)
- Shaungquan (双泉镇)
- Gaoming (高明镇)
- Fanjia (范家镇)
- Guanchi (官池镇)
- Qiangbai (羌白镇)
- Weilin (韦林镇)

Towns are upgraded from Townships.

- Xiazhai (下寨镇)
- Sucun (苏村镇)
- Zhaodu (赵渡镇)
- Pingming (平民镇)
- Nianqiao (埝桥镇)
- Duanjia (段家镇)

Former Townships merged to others.

- Hujia (芦家乡), Buchang (埠场乡), Boshi (博市乡), Shicao (石槽乡), Bayu (八于乡), Xizhai (西寨乡), Zhangjia (张家乡), Shadi (沙地乡)

== Climate ==
Climate data for Dali, elevation 351 m (1,152 ft), (1991–2020 normals, extremes 1981–2010)
Month	Jan	Feb	Mar	Apr	May	Jun	Jul	Aug	Sep	Oct	Nov	Dec	Year
Record high °C (°F)	16.2 (61.2)	22.7 (72.9)	29.6 (85.3)	37.6 (99.7)	38.8 (101.8)	41.8 (107.2)	40.1 (104.2)	38.9 (102.0)	37.6 (99.7)	32.1 (89.8)	24.8 (76.6)	18.1 (64.6)	41.8 (107.2)
Mean daily maximum °C (°F)	5.3 (41.5)	10.0 (50.0)	16.4 (61.5)	23.1 (73.6)	27.8 (82.0)	31.9 (89.4)	32.7 (90.9)	30.9 (87.6)	26.1 (79.0)	20.1 (68.2)	13.1 (55.6)	6.7 (44.1)	20.3 (68.6)
Daily mean °C (°F)	−0.6 (30.9)	3.5 (38.3)	9.6 (49.3)	16.0 (60.8)	20.9 (69.6)	25.3 (77.5)	27.0 (80.6)	25.3 (77.5)	20.1 (68.2)	13.7 (56.7)	6.5 (43.7)	0.6 (33.1)	14.0 (57.2)
Mean daily minimum °C (°F)	−5.0 (23.0)	−1.3 (29.7)	4.0 (39.2)	9.6 (49.3)	14.4 (57.9)	19.1 (66.4)	22.0 (71.6)	20.8 (69.4)	15.6 (60.1)	8.9 (48.0)	1.7 (35.1)	−3.8 (25.2)	8.8 (47.9)
Record low °C (°F)	−14.5 (5.9)	−17.4 (0.7)	−7.8 (18.0)	−1.6 (29.1)	2.6 (36.7)	9.5 (49.1)	14.6 (58.3)	13.1 (55.6)	4.5 (40.1)	−6.0 (21.2)	−10.2 (13.6)	−15.7 (3.7)	−17.4 (0.7)
Average precipitation mm (inches)	5.3 (0.21)	8.5 (0.33)	14.5 (0.57)	31.5 (1.24)	49.2 (1.94)	52.9 (2.08)	81.9 (3.22)	84.2 (3.31)	82.7 (3.26)	51.5 (2.03)	19.6 (0.77)	4.0 (0.16)	485.8 (19.12)
Average precipitation days (≥ 0.1 mm)	3.4	3.1	4.6	6.2	7.9	7.6	9.0	8.5	10.5	8.7	5.6	2.5	77.6
Average snowy days	3.7	2.6	1.1	0.1	0	0	0	0	0	0	1.1	2.4	11
Average relative humidity (%)	60	58	56	59	61	62	73	76	78	77	72	64	66
Mean monthly sunshine hours	156.6	156.0	191.4	217.6	236.4	233.4	243.3	218.5	166.6	156.2	148.8	159.2	2,284
Percentage possible sunshine	50	50	51	55	54	54	56	53	45	45	49	52	51
Source: China Meteorological Administration

== Transportation ==
- Dali railway station of the Datong–Xi'an passenger railway, with frequent service to Xi'an and Taiyuan.

== Famous figures ==
- Dali (fossil), excavated in 1978
- Ruoxi Zhang, former Minister of Education Ministry of PRC, is from Zhaoyi town in Dali county.
- Fengshou Shi, an expert of rapid calculation, is also from this county.
- Huaiying Dang was man of letters in Jin Dynasty. His ancestral home is Dali county.
- Xiandeng Ma was an official and a successful candidate in the highest imperial examinations in late Qing Dynasty.
