= Zhengzhou–Xi'an high-speed railway =

Railway line in China

Xuzhou–Lanzhou high-speed railway Zhengzhou–Xi'an section

Overview
- Native name: 徐兰高速铁路郑西段
- Status: Operational
- Owner: CR Zhengzhou; CR Xi'an
- Locale: Henan province Shaanxi province
- Termini: Zhengzhou; Xi'an North

Service
- Type: High-speed rail
- Operator(s): China Railway High-speed

History
- Opened: February 6, 2010

Technical
- Line length: 457 km (284 mi)
- Number of tracks: 2 (Double-track)
- Track gauge: 1,435 mm (4 ft 8 1/2 in) standard gauge
- Minimum radius: 7,000 m (4.3 mi)
- Electrification: 25 kV 50 Hz AC (Overhead line)
- Operating speed: 350 km/h (217 mph)

Zhengzhou–Xi'an high-speed railway
- Simplified Chinese: 徐兰高速铁路郑西段
- Traditional Chinese: 徐蘭高速鐵路鄭西段
Transcriptions
Standard Mandarin
- Hanyu Pinyin: Xú-Lán Gāosù Tiělù Zhèng-Xī Duàn
- IPA: [ɕǔ.lǎn káʊ.sû tʰjè.lû ʈʂə̂ŋ.ɕí twân]

Zhengzhou–Xi'an Passenger Dedicated Line
- Simplified Chinese: 郑西客运专线
- Traditional Chinese: 鄭西客運專線
Transcriptions
Standard Mandarin
- Hanyu Pinyin: Zhèng-Xī Kèyùn Zhuān Xiàn
- IPA: [ʈʂə̂ŋ.ɕí kʰɤ̂.ŷn ʈʂwán ɕjɛ̂n]

The Zhengzhou–Xi'an high-speed railway, also known as the Zhengxi passenger line, is a high-speed railway line operated by China Railway High-speed, connecting Zhengzhou and Xi'an, the provincial capitals of Henan and Shaanxi, respectively. It went into operation on February 6, 2010.

The line is one of the segments of the Xuzhou–Lanzhou high-speed railway, a high-speed mainline from Lanzhou to Xuzhou, paralleling the existing Longhai Railway line.

The densely populated corridor between Zhengzhou and Xi'an, both large regional centres, is home to some 100 million people. Its top speed is 350 km/h (220 mph) in operation and the minimum travel time between the two cities is 1 hour and 58 minutes, although in practice, the journey takes more than two hours with a few intermediate stops.

When the high-speed line first opened, the trains departed and arrived at the "old" main train stations of Zhengzhou and Xi'an. Once the new Xi'an North railway station was opened, all high-speed service in Xi'an was routed to it. In Zhengzhou, now both the Zhengzhou Railway Station and the new Zhengzhou East railway station are served by high-speed trains from Xi'an.

The faster, G-series trains on the Zhengzhou–Xi'an Railway are numbered G20xx. Westbound trains (Zhengzhou to Xi'an) are odd-numbered, while even numbers denote eastbound trains (Xi'an to Zhengzhou).

With the opening of the Zhengzhou–Wuhan section of the Beijing–Guangzhou high-speed railway in the fall of 2012, direct high-speed service from Xi'an to Wuhan, Changsha, Guangzhou, and Shenzhen was introduced. As well, after the Beijing-Shijiazhuang-Zhengzhou section of the Beijing–Guangzhou line became operational at the end of 2012, direct Xi'an-Beijing service became available.

The railway has made air service between Zhengzhou and Xi'an uncompetitive. All passenger flights between the two cities were suspended within 48 days of the start of regular high-speed rail service.

== Construction ==
Construction work began on September 25, 2005, and the railway opened for service on February 6, 2010. CRH trains will run at 350 km/h (220 mph) on the line.

The main line is 456.639 km (283.742 mi) long, with another 27.879 km (17.323 mi) extension connecting the existing Longhai Railway from Xi'an North to Xianyang Qindu. Ten railway stations were built along the line: Zhouzhou West, Gongyi South, Luoyang Longmen, Mianchi South, Sanmenxia South, Lingbao West, Huashan North, Weinan North, Lintong East, and Xi'an North. The minimum railway curve radius is 9,000 metres (30,000 ft) for most of the line and 7,000 metres (23,000 ft) for some difficult sections. The distance between two parallel tracks is 5 metres (16 ft 5 in).

The line includes the 8,460-metre (27,760 ft) long Zhangmao Tunnel, 7,851-metre (25,758 ft) long Hanguguan Tunnel, and the 7,685-metre (25,213 ft) long Qindong Tunnel. The line also includes the 79,732-metre (261,588 ft) long Weihe Grand Bridge, which, upon its completion, was the longest bridge in the world.

== Accidents ==
On November 14, 2009, a track inspection train seriously damaged 2,000 metres (6,600 ft) of the tracks near Huashan North Railway Station during a test run. The damaged section had to be removed and replaced. The railway was originally expected to be opened in December 2009, but the accident delayed the opening of the railway for at least one month.
