= Datangfurongyuan station =

Metro station in Xi'an, China

Datangfurongyuan 大唐芙蓉园
- Hangtianxincheng-bound platform

Chinese name
- Traditional Chinese: 大唐芙蓉園
- Simplified Chinese: 大唐芙蓉园
- Literal meaning: Great Tang Furong Garden (Tang Paradise)
Transcriptions
Standard Mandarin
- Hanyu Pinyin: Dàtáng Fúróngyuán
- Wade–Giles: Ta^{4}-t‘ang^{2} Fu^{2}-jung^{2}-yüan^{2}
- IPA: [tâ.tʰǎŋ fǔ.ɻʊ̌ŋ.ɥɛ̌n]

General information
- Location: Yanta District, Xi'an, Shaanxi; China
- Operator: Xi'an Metro Co. Ltd.
- Line: Line 4
- Platforms: 2 (1 island platform)

Construction
- Structure type: Underground

History
- Opened: 26 December 2018

Services
| Preceding station | Xi'an Metro | Following station |
|---|---|---|
| Dayanta towards Xi'an Beizhan | Line 4 | Qujiangchixi towards Hangtianxincheng |
Location

Datangfurongyuan station (Chinese: 大唐芙蓉园站) is a station of Line 4 of the Xi'an Metro located in Xi'an's Yanta District. It started operations on 26 December 2018.

The station serves the nearby Tang Paradise, which it is named after. Shaanxi Performing Arts Center, Xi'an Art Museum and Tang City Wall Ruins Park are also nearby.

== Station layout ==
| G | Exits | Exits A–D |
| L1; Concourse | Lobby | Customer service, ticket machines, ticket gates, Chang'an Card machines |
| L2; Platforms | arrow for L | 4 towards Xi'an Beizhan (Dayanta) |
| L2; Platforms | Island platform, doors open on the left |
| L2; Platforms | arrow for R | 4 towards Hangtianxincheng (Qujiangchixi) |
