= Dayanta station =

Metro station in Xi'an, China

Dayanta 大雁塔
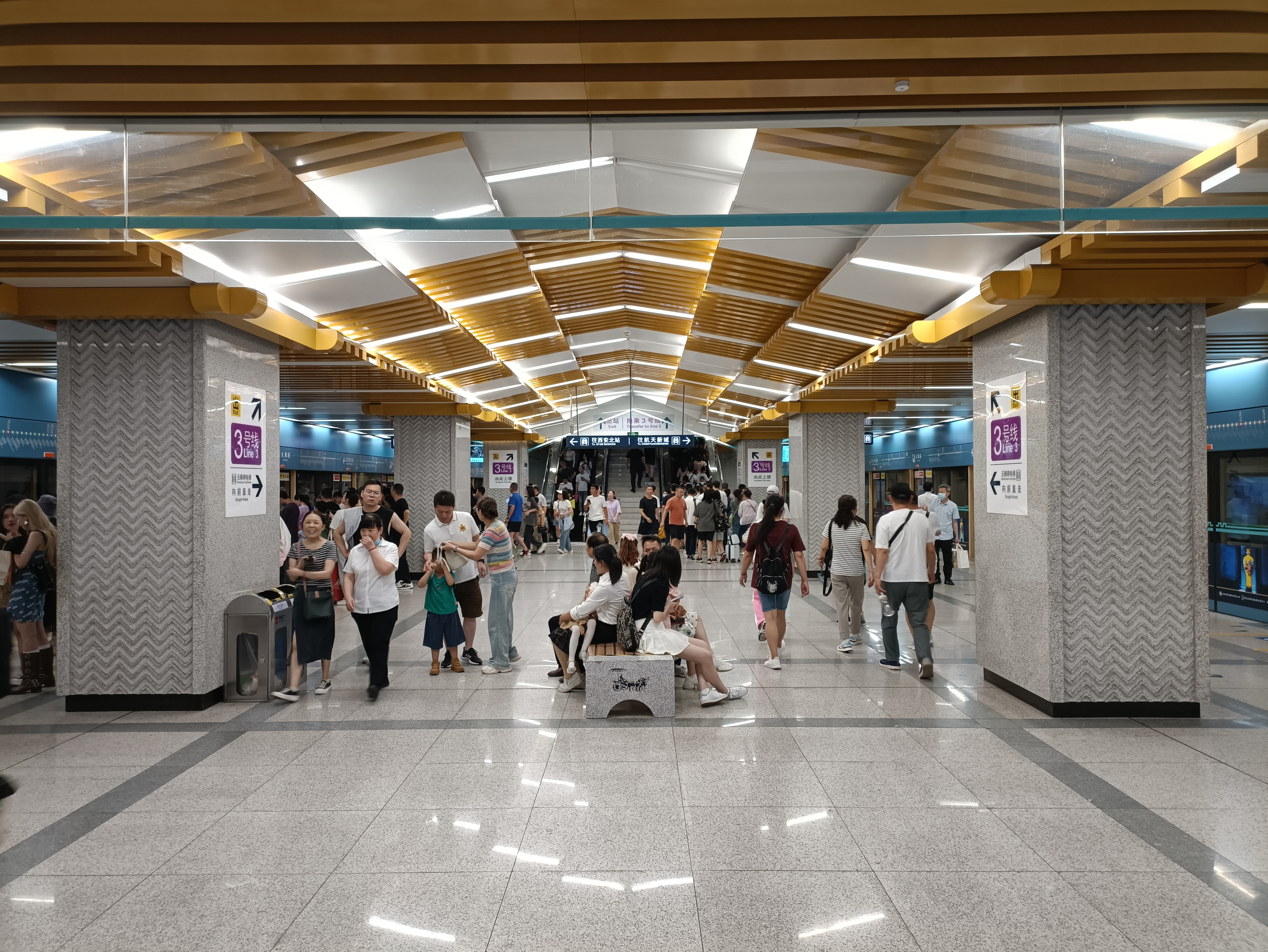
- Line 4 platform

General information
- Location: Yanta District, Xi'an, Shaanxi; China
- Coordinates: 34.2244°N 108.9594°E
- Operated by: Xi'an Metro Co. Ltd.
- Lines: Line 3 Line 4
- Platforms: 4 (2 island platforms)

Construction
- Structure type: Underground

History
- Opened: 8 November 2016 (Line 3); 26 December 2018 (Line 4)

Services
Preceding station	Xi'an Metro	Following station
Xiaozhai towards Yuhuazhai	Line 3	Beichitou towards Baoshuiqu
Xi'ankejidaxue towards Xi'an Beizhan	Line 4	Datangfurongyuan towards Hangtianxincheng
Location

Dayanta station (Chinese: 大雁塔站; pinyin: Dàyàntǎ zhàn) is an interchange station on Line 3 and Line 4 of the Xi'an Metro. It began operations on 8 November 2016. This station also serves for Line 4.

"Dayanta" means "Giant Wild Goose Pagoda", as this station is located on the north side of the northern square of the pagoda.
