= Baiqizhai station =

Metro station in Xi'an, China

Baiqizhai 摆旗寨
- Airport W. (T1, T2, T3)–bound platform

Chinese name
- Traditional Chinese: 擺旗寨
- Simplified Chinese: 摆旗寨
Transcriptions
Standard Mandarin
- Hanyu Pinyin: Bǎiqízhài
- Wade–Giles: Pai^{3}-ch‘i^{2}-chai^{4}
- IPA: [pàɪ.tɕʰǐ.ʈʂâɪ]

General information
- Location: Weicheng District, Xianyang, Shaanxi; China
- Operator: Xi'an Metro Co. Ltd.
- Line: Line 14
- Platforms: 2 side platforms

Construction
- Structure type: Underground

History
- Opened: 29 September 2019

Services
Preceding station	Xi'an Metro	Following station
Yishuzhongxin towards Airport W. (T1, T2, T3)	Line 14	Changling towards Heshao
Location

Baiqizhai station (Chinese: 摆旗寨站) is a station of Line 14 of the Xi'an Metro located in Xianyang's Weicheng District. It started operations on 29 September 2019.

== Station layout ==
L2; Platforms	Side platforms, doors open on the right
L2; Platforms	arrow for L	14 towards Airport W. (T1, T2, T3) (Yishuzhongxin)
L2; Platforms	arrow for R	14 towards Heshao (Changling)
L2; Platforms	Side platforms, doors open on the right
G Concourse	Lobby, exits	Customer service, ticket machines, ticket gates, Chang'an Card machines, exits A–C

== Exits ==
Designation	Nearby landmarks	Image
A	Qinzhi Avenue, Lanchi Fourth Road West Section	
B	Qinzhi Avenue (W)	
C	Qinzhi Avenue (W), Jingzhi First Road	
