= Shaanxi Province Stadium =

Sports venue in Xi'an, China

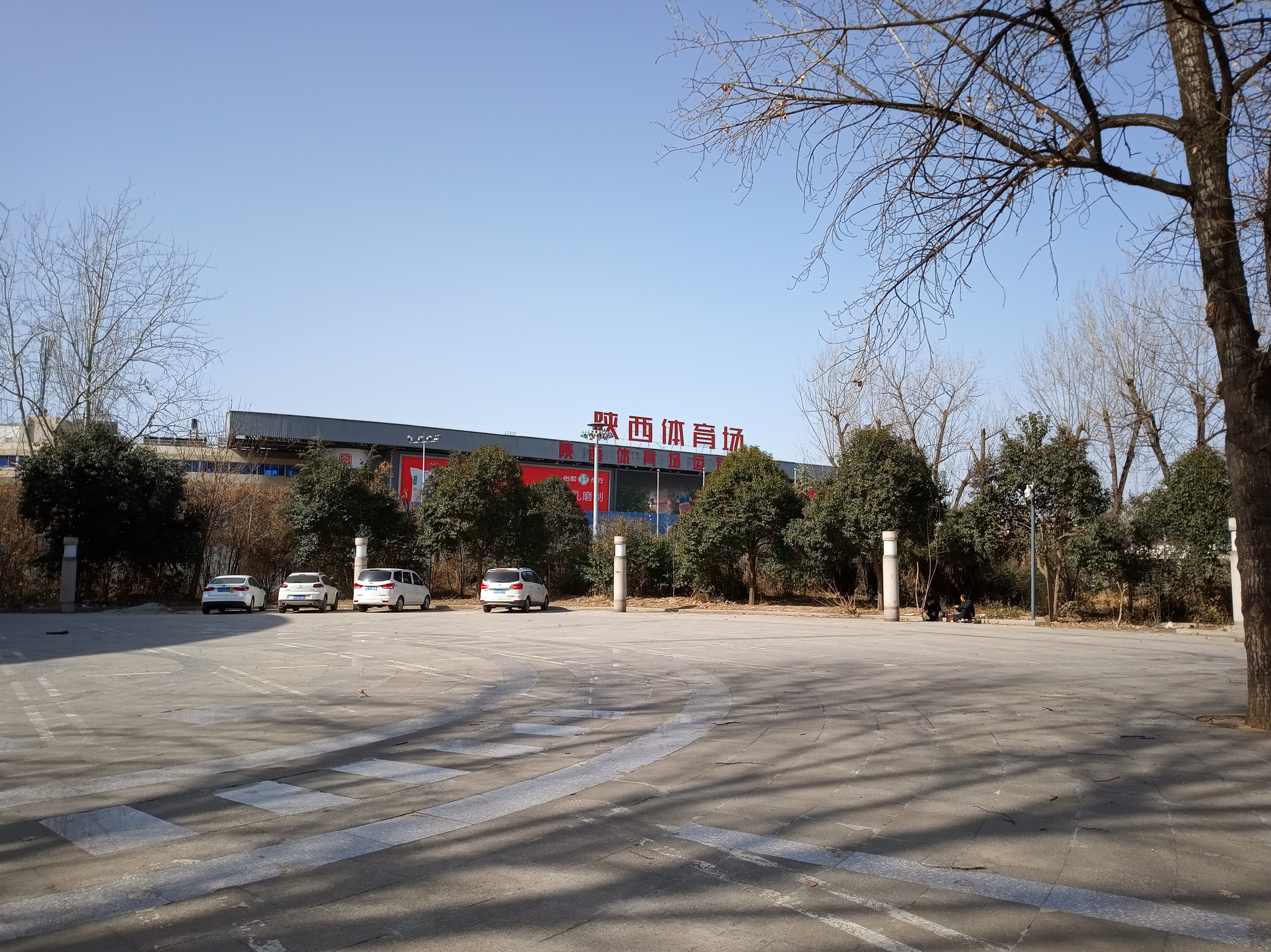
- Interactive map of Shaanxi Province Stadium
- Full name: Shaanxi Province Stadium
- Location: Xi'an, Shaanxi, China
- Coordinates: 34°14′2″N 108°56′15″E
- Owner: Shaanxi Provincial Government
- Capacity: 42,383
- Surface: Grass
- Public transit: 2 Tiyuchang

Construction
- Opened: 1954
- Renovated: 1999, 2019–2020
- Cost: ¥ 2.5 billion

Tenants
- Shaanxi Chanba (2006–2011); Shaanxi Chang'an Athletic; Shaanxi Union (2024); Xi'an Chongde Ronghai (2024)

Shaanxi Province Stadium (Chinese: 陕西省体育场), also known as Zhuque Stadium (Chinese: 朱雀体育场) because it is located near Zhuque Square (朱雀广场), is a multi-use stadium in Xi'an, China. It is used mainly for football matches and athletics events. The stadium had a capacity of 50,100 people, but a renovation in 2020 reduced it to 43,000. It was named Coca-Cola Stadium (Chinese: 可口可乐体育场) from 2005 to 2007.
