= Qujiangchixi station =

Metro station in Xi'an, China

Qujiangchixi 曲江池西
- Concourse

Chinese name
- Chinese: 曲江池西
- Literal meaning: Qujiang Pool West
Transcriptions
Standard Mandarin
- Hanyu Pinyin: Qūjiāngchí xī
- Wade–Giles: Ch‘ü^{1}-chiang^{1}-ch‘ih^{2} hsi^{1}
- IPA: [tɕʰý.tɕjáŋ.ʈʂʰɨ̌ ɕí]

General information
- Location: Yanta District, Xi'an, Shaanxi; China
- Operator: Xi'an Metro Co. Ltd.
- Lines: Line 4 Line 8
- Platforms: 4 (2 island platforms)

Construction
- Structure type: Underground

History
- Opened: 26 December 2018

Services
Preceding station	Xi'an Metro	Following station
Datangfurongyuan towards Xi'an Beizhan	Line 4	Jinhutuo towards Hangtianxincheng
Datangbuyecheng Clockwise	Line 8	Hanyao Counter-clockwise
Location

Qujiangchixi station (Chinese: 曲江池西站) is an interchange station of Line 4 and Line 8 of the Xi'an Metro located in Xi'an's Yanta District. It started operations on 26 December 2018.

The station serves the nearby Qujiang Pool Heritage Park, which it is named after.

== Station layout ==
G	Exits	Exits A–F
L1; Concourse	Lobby	Customer service, ticket machines, ticket gates, Chang'an Card machines
L2; 4 platforms	arrow for L	4 towards Xi'an Beizhan (Datangfurongyuan)
L2; 4 platforms	Island platform, doors open on the left
L2; 4 platforms	arrow for R	4 towards Hangtianxincheng (Jinhutuo)
L3; 8 platforms	arrow for L	8 clockwise (Datangbuyecheng)
L3; 8 platforms	Island platform, doors open on the left
L3; 8 platforms	arrow for R	8 counter-clockwise (Hanyao)

== Exits ==
Designation	Nearby landmarks	Image
A	Yannan Fourth Road (N), Furong West Road (W), Miaopotou Road	
B	Yannan Fourth Road (S), Furong West Road (W), Yannan Fifth Road, Miaopotou Road	
C	Qujiangchi West Road, Yannan Fourth Road (S), Furong West Road (E), Qujiangchi South Road	
D	Yannan Fourth Road (N), Furong West Road (E), Qujiangchi West Road, Qujiang Pool Heritage Park, Shaanxi Provincial Tobacco Monopoly Bureau	
