= Aotizhongxin station (Xi'an Metro) =

Metro station in Xi'an, China

Aotizhongxin 奥体中心
- Platform

Chinese name
- Traditional Chinese: 奧體中心
- Simplified Chinese: 奥体中心
- Literal meaning: Olympic Sports Center
Transcriptions
Standard Mandarin
- Hanyu Pinyin: Ào tǐ zhōngxīn
- Wade–Giles: Ao^{4} t‘i^{3} chung^{1}-hsin^{1}
- IPA: [âʊ tʰì ʈʂʊ́ŋ.ɕín]

General information
- Location: Baqiao District, Xi'an, Shaanxi; China
- Operator: Xi'an Metro Co. Ltd.
- Lines: Line 14; Line 7 (planned)
- Platforms: 2 (1 island platforms)

Construction
- Structure type: Underground

History
- Opened: 29 June 2021

Services
Preceding station	Xi'an Metro	Following station
Beichen towards Airport W. (T1, T2, T3)	Line 14	Shuangzhai towards Heshao
Location

Aotizhongxin station (Chinese: 奥体中心站) is a station of Line 14 of the Xi'an Metro located in Xi'an's Baqiao District. It started operations on 29 June 2021.

== Station layout ==
G	Exits	Exits A–D
L1; Concourse	Lobby	Customer service, ticket machines, ticket gates, Chang'an Card machines
L2; Platforms	arrow for L	14 towards Airport W. (T1, T2, T3) (Beichen)
L2; Platforms	Island platform, doors open on the left
L2; Platforms	arrow for R	14 towards Heshao (Shuangzhai)

== Exits ==
Designation	Nearby landmarks		Image
A1	Ba River	Bawei Avenue (E), Xi'an Olympic Sports Center (West Square)	
A2	Ba River	Bawei Avenue (W), Light and Shadow Cultural Park	
B1	Gangxing Second Road, Ba River	Bawei Avenue (E)	
B2	Gangxing Second Road, Ba River	Bawei Avenue (W)	
C	Gangxing Second Road (S), Bawei Avenue (E)		
D	Xi'an Olympic Sports Center (South Square), Gangxing Second Road (N), Bawei Avenue (E)		
