= Dianshita station =

Xi'an Metro station

Dianshita 电视塔
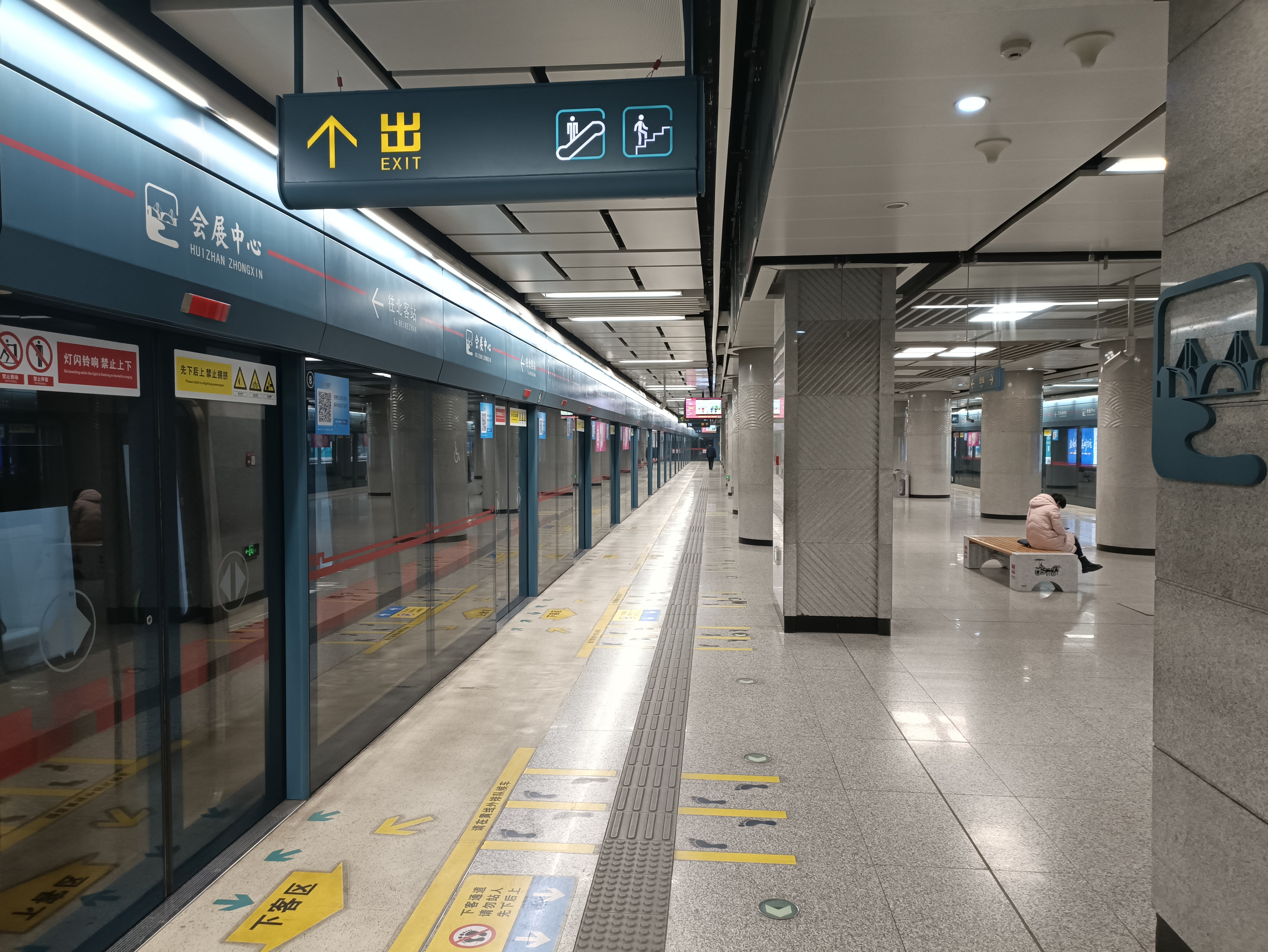
- Line 2 platform

General information
- Location: Chang'an South Road × Yanzhan Road & Zhangba East Road; Yanta District, Xi'an, Shaanxi; China
- Coordinates: 34°12′00″N 108°56′32″E
- Operated by: Xi'an Metro Co. Ltd.
- Lines: Line 2; Line 8
- Platforms: 4 (2 island platforms)

Construction
- Structure type: Underground

History
- Opened: 16 September 2011 (Line 2); 26 December 2024 (Line 8)
- Previous names: Huizhanzhongxin (before 26 June 2023)

Services
Preceding station	Xi'an Metro	Following station
Balicun towards Caotan	Line 2	Sanyao towards Changninggong
Dongyilu Clockwise	Line 8	Datangbuyecheng Counter-clockwise
Location

Dianshita station (simplified Chinese: 电视塔站; traditional Chinese: 電視塔站; pinyin: Diànshìtǎ zhàn; lit. 'Television Tower station'), formerly known as Huizhanzhongxin station, is a transfer station of Line 2 and Line 8 of the Xi'an Metro. The part of Line 2 started operations on 16 September 2011, and renamed to Dianshita station in June 2023. The part of Line 8 opened on 26 December 2024.
