= Weiqunan station =

Metro station in Xi'an, China

Weiqunan 韦曲南
- Platform

Chinese name
- Traditional Chinese: 韋曲南
- Simplified Chinese: 韦曲南
- Literal meaning: Weiqu South
Transcriptions
Standard Mandarin
- Hanyu Pinyin: Wěiqū nán
- Wade–Giles: Wei^{3}-ch‘ü^{1} nan^{2}
- IPA: [wèɪ.tɕʰý nǎn]

General information
- Location: Chang'an District, Xi'an, Shaanxi; China
- Operator: Xi'an Metro Co. Ltd.
- Line: Line 2
- Platforms: 2 (1 island platform)

Construction
- Structure type: Underground

History
- Opened: 16 June 2014

Services
Preceding station	Xi'an Metro	Following station
Hangtiancheng towards Caotan	Line 2	Hejiaying towards Changninggong
Location

Weiqunan station (Chinese: 韦曲南站) is a station of Line 2 of the Xi'an Metro located in Xi'an's Chang'an District. It started operations on 16 June 2014.

The station was the southern terminus of Line 2 from its opening to June 2023, when the phase 2 extension to Changninggong station opened.

== Station layout ==
G	Exits	Exits A, B, D
L1; Concourse	Lobby	Customer service, ticket machines, ticket gates, Chang'an Card machines
L2; Platforms	arrow for L	2 towards Caotan (Hangtiancheng)
L2; Platforms	Island platform, doors open on the left
L2; Platforms	arrow for R	2 towards Changninggong (Hejiaying)

== Station artworks ==
Concourse art wall Guanzhong Bajing (关中八景), June 2023

Exit A art wall Zhiran zhi Meng (自然之梦), February 2022

Exit B art wall Pian Shi Hua Zhi (遍是花枝), February 2022

== Exits ==
Designation	Nearby landmarks	Image
A	South Chang'an Street (W), Weiqu South Street	
B	South Chang'an Street (W), Xijing University	
C (Note: Exit C is marked on signs, but is not in use.)	South Chang'an Street (E)	—N/a
D	South Chang'an Street, Weiqu South Street	

== Gallery ==
Concourse, April 2023

Beikezhan-bound platform (now called Xi'an Beizhan; now Caotan bound), February 2022

Termination platform (now Changninggong bound), February 2022

Depot-bound train at the Changninggong-bound platform, July 2023

Platform before phase 2 extension to Changninggong, April 2023
