= Xingzhengzhongxin station =

Metro station in Xi'an, China

Xingzhengzhongxin 行政中心
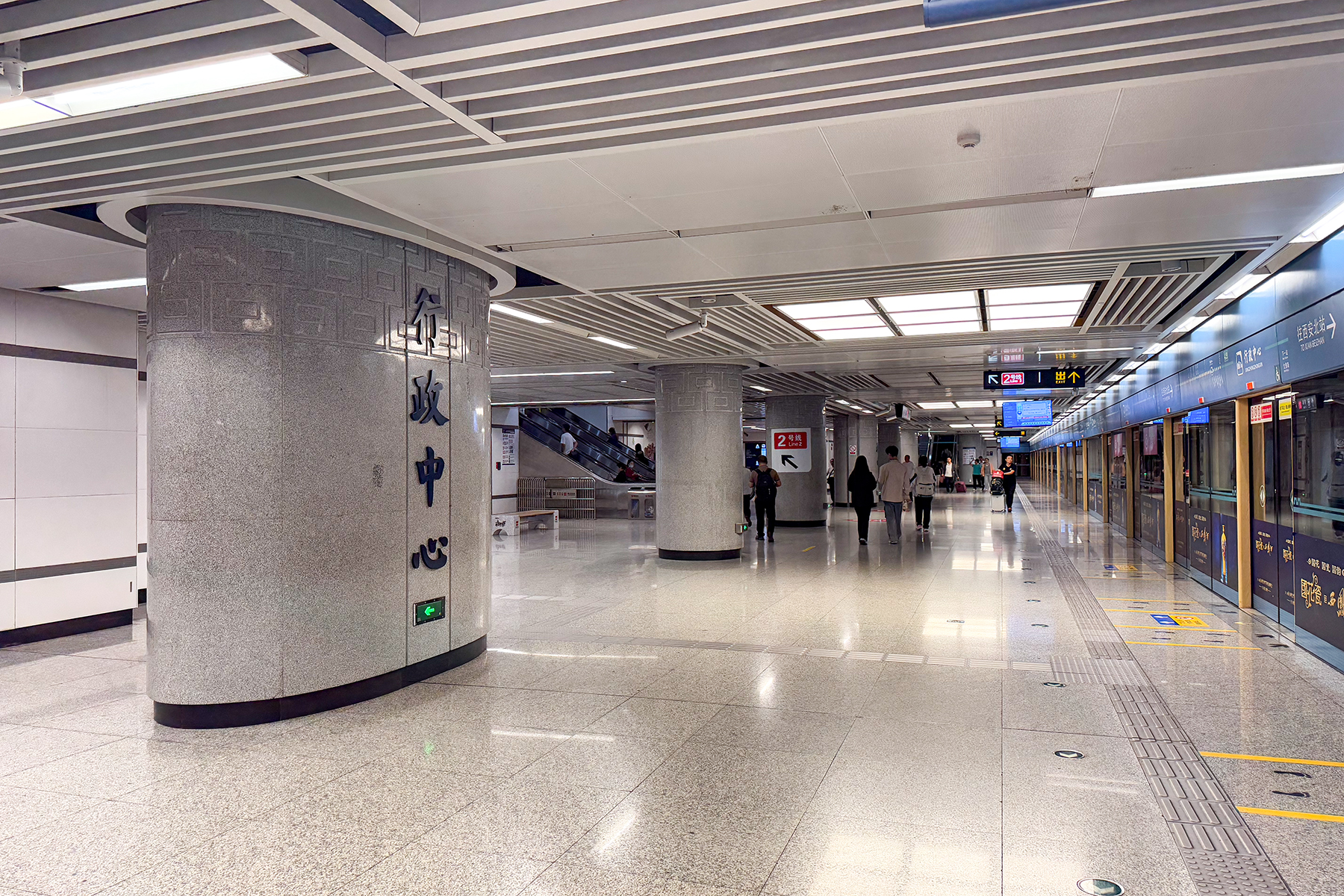
- Line 4 platform

General information
- Location: Weiyang District, Xi'an, Shaanxi; China
- Coordinates: 34.34258°N 108.94259°E
- Operated by: Xi'an Metro Co. Ltd.
- Lines: Line 2 Line 4
- Platforms: 4 (1 island platform, 2 side platforms)

Construction
- Structure type: Underground

History
- Opened: 16 September 2011 (Line 2); 26 December 2018 (Line 4)

Services
Preceding station	Xi'an Metro	Following station
Fengcheng 10 Lu towards Caotan	Line 2	Fengcheng 5-lu towards Changninggong
Wenjing Lu towards Xi'an Beizhan	Line 4	Shi Zhongyi Yiyuan towards Hangtianxincheng
Location

Xingzhengzhongxin station (Chinese: 行政中心站) is an interchange station of Line 2 and Line 4 of the Xi'an Metro. It started operations on 16 September 2011.
