= Balicun station =

Metro station in Xi'an, China

Balicun 八里村
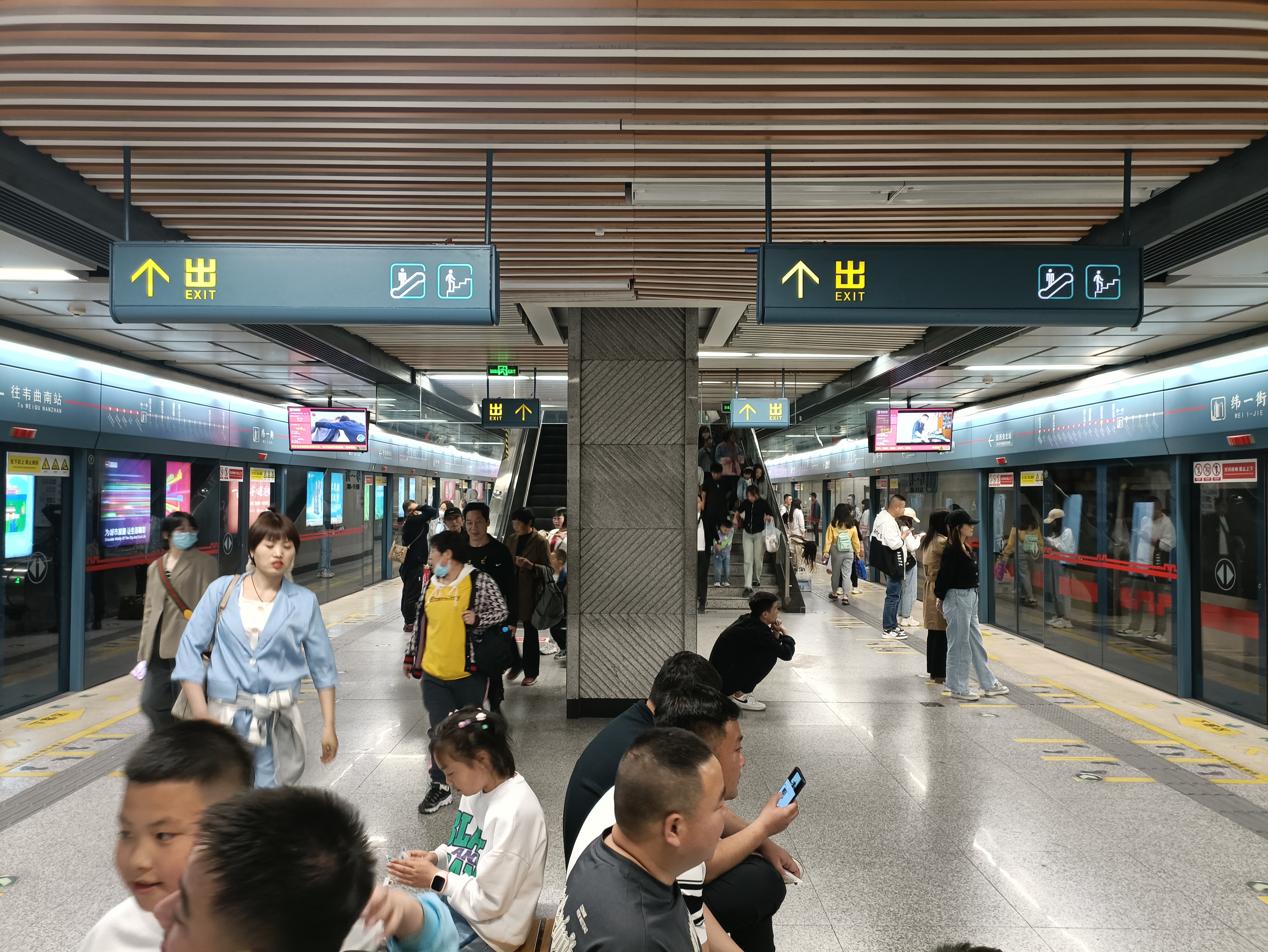

General information
- Other names: Wei 1-jie (纬一街) (until 25 July 2025)
- Location: Yanta District, Xi'an, Shaanxi; China
- Operated by: Xi'an Metro Co. Ltd.
- Line: Line 2
- Platforms: 2 (1 island platform)

Construction
- Structure type: Underground

History
- Opened: 16 September 2011

Services
Preceding station	Xi'an Metro	Following station
Xiaozhai towards Caotan	Line 2	Dianshita towards Changninggong
Location

Balicun station (Chinese: 八里村站), formerly known as Wei 1-jie station (Chinese: 纬一街站), is a station of Line 2 of the Xi'an Metro. It started operations on 16 September 2011. It has been renamed on 25 July 2025.
