= Airport (T5) station =

Metro station in Xi'an, China

Airport (T5) 机场（T5）
- Platform

Chinese name
- Traditional Chinese: 機場（T5）
- Simplified Chinese: 机场（T5）
Transcriptions
Standard Mandarin
- Hanyu Pinyin: Jīchǎng
- Wade–Giles: Chi^{1}-ch‘ang^{3}
- IPA: [tɕí.ʈʂʰàŋ]

General information
- Location: Weicheng District, Xianyang, Shaanxi; China
- Operator: Xi'an Metro Co. Ltd.
- Lines: Line 14; Line 12 (planned); Line 17 (planned)
- Platforms: 2 (1 island platforms)

Construction
- Structure type: Underground

History
- Opened: 18 February 2025

Services
Preceding station	Xi'an Metro	Following station
Airport W. (T1, T2, T3) Terminus	Line 14	Konggangxincheng towards Heshao
Location

Airport (T5) station (Chinese: 机场（T5）站) is a station of Line 14 of the Xi'an Metro located in Xianyang's Weicheng District. It started operations on 18 February 2025, two days before the opening of terminal 5 itself.

The station serves terminal 5 of Xi'an Xianyang International Airport, and is one of the two that serve the airport, with the other being Airport W. (T1, T2, T3) station, serving terminals 1, 2 and 3. The two airport stations are the only two on the Xi'an Metro network to have their names translated to English, rather than fully rendered in romanisation.

== Station layout ==
G Concourse	Lobby, exits	Customer service, ticket machines, ticket gates, Chang'an Card machines, exits
L1; Platforms	arrow for L	14 towards Airport W. (T1, T2, T3) (terminus)
L1; Platforms	Island platform, doors open on the left
L1; Platforms	arrow for R	14 towards Heshao (Konggangxincheng)

== Exits ==
The station concourse is built into terminal 5 itself, meaning that the station does not have its own exits. There is a designated entrance and a designated exit to the rest of the terminal. Security checks are required for passing through.

Designation	Nearby landmarks	Image
Entrance		
Exit	Terminal 5	
