= Line 14 (Xi'an Metro) =

Metro line in Xi'an, China

- 14
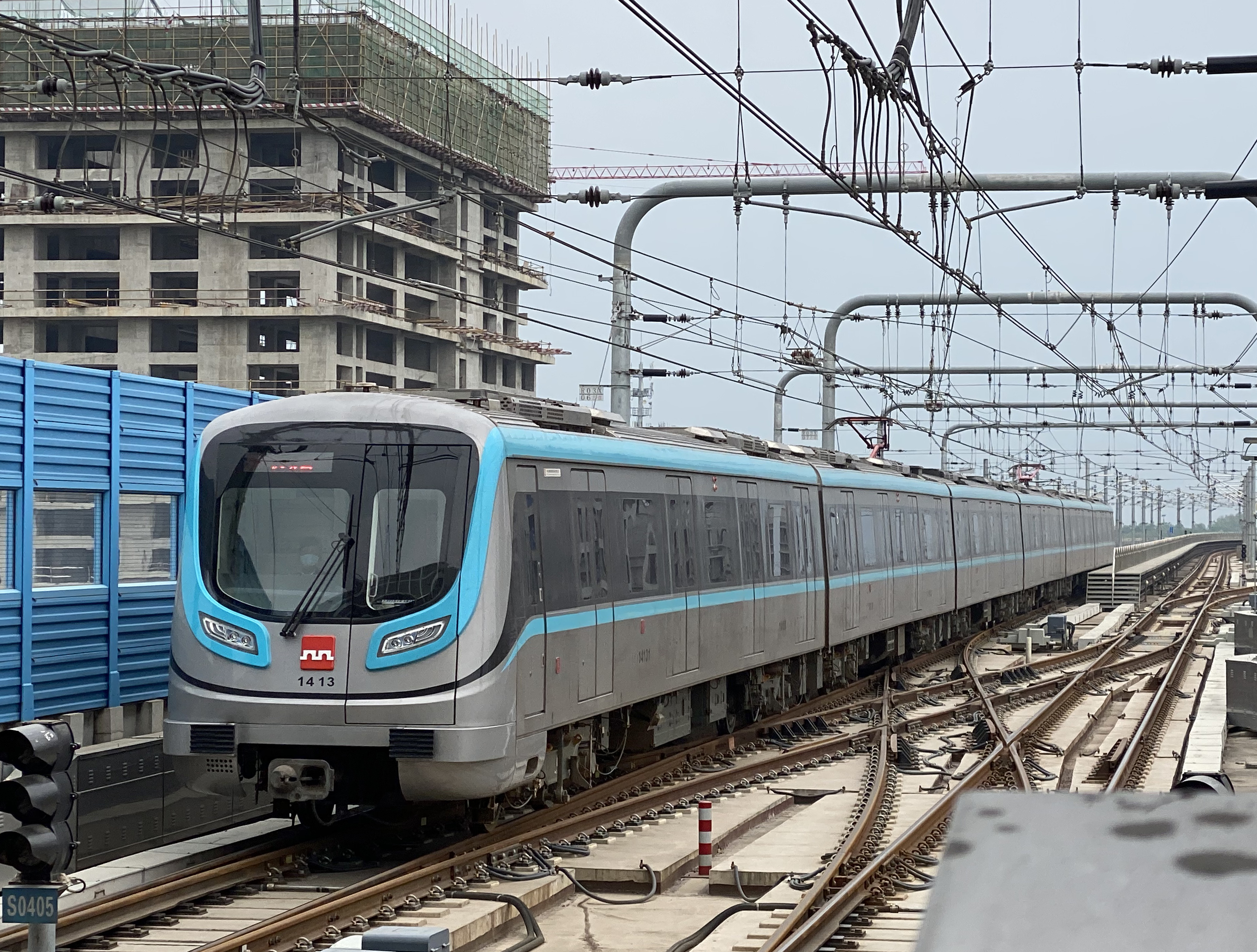
- A train of Xi'an Metro Line 14

Overview
- Other name: Airport Intercity Line (Before 29 June 2021)
- Status: Operational
- Termini: Airport West (T1, T2, T3); Heshao
- Stations: 18

Service
- Type: Rapid transit, Airport rail link
- System: Xi'an Metro
- Rolling stock: 6-car Type B

History
- Opened: 29 September 2019; 6 years ago (West section); 29 June 2021; 5 years ago (East section)

Technical
- Line length: 42.96 km (26.69 mi) (full line); 29.31 km (18.21 mi) (West section); 13.65 km (8.48 mi) (East section)
- Character: Underground & Elevated
- Track gauge: 1,435 mm (4 ft 8 1/2 in)

Line 14 of Xi'an Metro (Chinese: 西安地铁14号线; pinyin: Xī'ān Dìtiě Shísì Hào Xiàn) is a rapid transit line in Xi'an and Xianyang, Shaanxi Province, China. It provides service to Xi'an Xianyang International Airport. On 29 June 2021 at 11:00 am, Airport Intercity Line merged into Line 14 (East section) to form Xi'an Metro Line 14.

== Opening timeline ==
Segment	Commencement	Length	Station(s)	Name
Airport West (T1, T2, T3) — Xi'an Beizhan	29 September 2019	29.31 km (18.21 mi)	9	West section
Xi'an Beizhan — Heshao	29 June 2021	13.65 km (8.48 mi)	8	East section
Airport (T5)	18 February 2025	-	1	Infill station

== Section ==
Route of Line 14

=== West section ===
Construction of the West section from Airport West (T1, T2, T3) to Xi'an Beizhan started on 30 December 2011, and opened on 29 September 2019. In January 2021, the operator become Xi'an Metro. On 29 June 2021, it was officially renamed Line 14.

=== East section ===
The east section from Xi'an Beizhan to Heshao was opened on 29 June 2021.

== Stations ==
Station name		Connections	Location	
English	Chinese	Connections	Location	
Airport West (T1, T2, T3)	机场西（T1、T2、T3）	XIY	Weicheng	Xianyang
Airport (T5)	机场（T5）	XIY	Weicheng	Xianyang
Konggangxincheng	空港新城		Weicheng	Xianyang
Yishuzhongxin	艺术中心		Weicheng	Xianyang
Baiqizhai	摆旗寨		Weicheng	Xianyang
Changling	长陵		Weicheng	Xianyang
Qinhanxincheng	秦汉新城		Weicheng	Xianyang
Qingong	秦宫		Weicheng	Xianyang
Weihenan	渭河南		Weiyang	Xi'an
Xi'an Beizhan (Note: formerly Beikezhan (Beiguangchang) station (北客站（北广场）), transfer gateway with line 2 opened on 25 June 2021, renamed to Xi'an Beizhan on 20 September 2022.)	西安北站	2 4 EAY	Weiyang	Xi'an
Wenjingshangongyuan	文景山公园		Weiyang	Xi'an
Xi'angongda · Wudelu	西安工大·武德路	10	Weiyang	Xi'an
Beichen	北辰		Weiyang	Xi'an
Aotizhongxin	奥体中心		Baqiao	Xi'an
Shuangzhai	双寨	3	Baqiao	Xi'an
Xinsi	新寺		Baqiao	Xi'an
Gangwudadao	港务大道		Baqiao	Xi'an
Heshao	贺韶		Baqiao	Xi'an
