= Line 4 (Xi'an Metro) =

Metro line in Xi'an, China

- 4
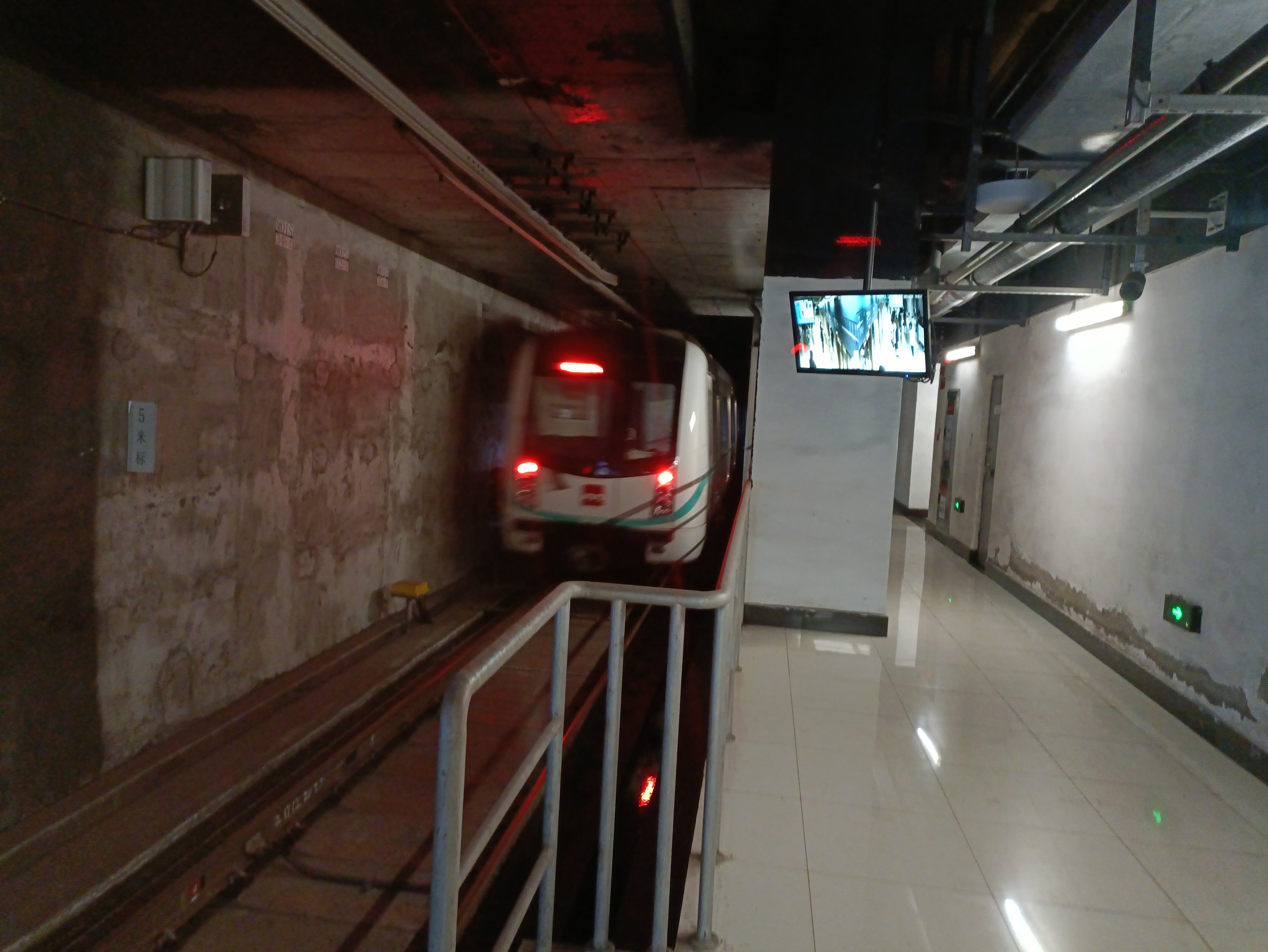
- A train of Xi'an Metro Line 4

Overview
- Status: Operational
- Owner: Xi'an Metro Ltd
- Locale: Xi'an
- Termini: Xi'an Beizhan; Hangtianxincheng
- Stations: 29

Service
- Type: Rapid transit
- System: Xi'an Metro
- Services: 1
- Operator(s): Xi'an Metro Ltd
- Daily ridership: 670,200 (2021 record)

History
- Opened: 26 December 2018; 7 years ago

Technical
- Line length: 35.2 km (21.9 mi)
- Number of tracks: 2
- Character: Underground
- Track gauge: 1,435 mm (4 ft 8 1/2 in)

Line 4 of Xi'an Metro (Chinese: 西安地铁四号线; pinyin: Xī'ān Dìtiě Sì Hào Xiàn) is a metro line running from north to south, in Xi'an, Shaanxi Province, China. It was opened on 26 December 2018. The line is 35.2 km (21.9 mi) in length with 29 stations. The line is colored Tiffany Blue on system maps.

== Opening timeline ==
Segment	Commencement	Length	Station(s)	Name
Xi'an Beizhan — Hangtianxincheng	26 December 2018	35.2 km (21.9 mi)	28	Phase 1
Xi'anzhan	25 September 2022		1	Infill station

== Stations (from North to South) ==
Services		Station name		Connections	Distance km		Location
Services		English	Chinese	Connections	Distance km		Location
●	●	Xi'an Beizhan (Note: formerly Beikezhan (Beiguangchang) station (北客站（北广场）), transfer gateway with line 2 opened on 25 June 2021, renamed to Xi'an Beizhan on 20 September 2022.)	西安北站	2 14; EAY	0.000	0.000	Weiyang
●	●	Yuandinglu (Note: Was Yuanshuolu station (元朔路).)	元鼎路		1.899	1.899	Weiyang
●	●	Fengcheng 12-lu	凤城十二路		0.902	2.801	Weiyang
●	●	Fengcheng 9-lu	凤城九路		1.301	4.102	Weiyang
●	●	Wenjinglu	文景路		1.184	5.285	Weiyang
●	●	Xingzhengzhongxin	行政中心	2	0.987	6.272	Weiyang
●	●	Shizhongyiyiyuan	市中医医院		1.206	7.478	Weiyang
●	●	Changqinglu	常青路		1.482	8.960	Weiyang
●	●	Baihuacun	百花村		1.028	9.988	Weiyang
●	●	Yujiazhai	余家寨	8	1.034	11.022	Weiyang
●	●	Daminggongbei	大明宫北		1.005	12.027	Weiyang
●	●	Daminggong	大明宫		1.263	13.290	Weiyang
●	●	Hanyuandian	含元殿		1.007	14.296	Xincheng
●	●	Xi'anzhan	西安站	XAY	1.229	15.526	Xincheng
●	●	Wulukou	五路口	1	1.062	16.588	Xincheng
●	●	Dachaishi	大差市	6	1.099	17.686	Beilin
●	●	Hepingmen	和平门		1.071	18.758	Beilin
●	●	Jianzhukejidaxue · Lijiacun	建筑科技大学·李家村	5	0.951	19.709	Beilin
●	●	Xi'ankejidaxue	西安科技大学		0.870	20.578	Beilin
●	●	Dayanta	大雁塔	3	1.109	21.687	Yanta
●	●	Datangfurongyuan	大唐芙蓉园		1.820	23.507	Yanta
●	●	Qujiangchixi	曲江池西	8	1.495	25.002	Yanta
●	●	Jinhutuo	金滹沱		1.869	26.871	Yanta
●	●	Hangtiandadao	航天大道		1.099	27.970	Chang'an
●	●	Feitianlu	飞天路		0.913	28.883	Chang'an
●	●	Dongchang'anjie	东长安街	15	0.932	29.815	Chang'an
●	●	Shenzhoudadao	神舟大道		1.874	31.689	Chang'an
●	●	Hangtiandonglu	航天东路		1.169	32.858	Chang'an
●		Hangtianxincheng	航天新城		1.520	34.378	Chang'an
