= Xi'ankejidaxue station =

Metro station in Xi'an, China

Xi'ankejidaxue 西安科技大学
- Platform

Chinese name
- Traditional Chinese: 西安科技大學
- Simplified Chinese: 西安科技大学
- Literal meaning: Xi'an University of Science and Technology
Transcriptions
Standard Mandarin
- Hanyu Pinyin: Xī'ān kējì dàxué
- Wade–Giles: Hsi^{1}-an^{1} k‘o^{1}-chi^{4} ta^{4}-hsüeh^{2}
- IPA: [ɕí.án kʰɤ́.tɕî tâ.ɕɥě]

General information
- Location: Beilin District, Xi'an, Shaanxi; China
- Operator: Xi'an Metro Co. Ltd.
- Line: Line 4
- Platforms: 2 (1 island platform)

Construction
- Structure type: Underground

History
- Opened: 26 December 2018

Services
Preceding station	Xi'an Metro	Following station
Jianzhukejidaxue · Lijiacun towards Xi'an Beizhan	Line 4	Dayanta towards Hangtianxincheng

Xi'ankejidaxue station (Chinese: 西安科技大学站) is a station of Line 4 of the Xi'an Metro located in Xi'an's Beilin District. It started operations on 26 December 2018.

== Station layout ==
G	Exits	Exits A–C
L1; Concourse	Lobby	Customer service, ticket machines, ticket gates, Chang'an Card machines
L2; Platforms	arrow for L	4 towards Xi'an Beizhan (Jianzhukejidaxue · Lijiacun)
L2; Platforms	Island platform, doors open on the left
L2; Platforms	arrow for R	4 towards Hangtianxincheng (Dayanta)
