= Xi'an International University =

Private college in Xi'an, Shaanxi, China

Coordinates: 34°14′00″N 108°52′09″E

- 西安外事学院
- Motto: 化鱼成龙
- Type: Private college
- Established: 1992
- President: Huang Teng
- Administrative staff: 1,700
- Students: 20,000
- Location: Xi'an, Shaanxi, China
- Campus: 1.26 sq.km.
- Colors
- Website: www.xaiu.edu.cn

Chinese name
- Simplified Chinese: 西安外事学院
- Traditional Chinese: 西安外事學院
Transcriptions
Standard Mandarin
- Hanyu Pinyin: Xī'ān Wàishì Xuéyuàn

Xi'an International University (abbreviation: XAIU; Chinese: 西安外事学院; lit. 'Xi'an International College') is a private college in Xi'an, Shaanxi, China.

Founded in 1992, XAIU sits on 1.26 square kilometers of land. The university has about 20,000 students and 1,700 faculty and staff. XAIU includes 8 colleges offering 67 major fields of study, which cover Management, Economics, Humanities, Medicine, Engineering, Agriculture, and Arts.

== History ==
Founded in 1992, Xi'an International University was originally a service training college (original name: 西安外事服务培训学院). In 1996, with the approval of the Shaanxi Provincial Department of Education, the college became one of the first private academic institutions in Shaanxi province to award diplomas through examination.

In May 2000, with the approval of the Shaanxi Provincial People's Government, XAIU became a vocational college.

In March 2005, with the approval of China's Ministry of Education, XAIU became an undergraduate college and was officially renamed Xi'an International University (Chinese: 西安外事学院). Successfully adapting to its new role, in June 2009 (4 years after the first students enrolled in the first undergraduate programs), Xi'an International University was granted the right to award bachelor's degrees.

In May 2009, XAIU also established the College of Entrepreneurship (Chinese: 创业学院), the first entrepreneurship college established by a private university in China.

In 2010, the university established a training platform for students to obtain a 'Master's degree in Business Administration and Entrepreneurship'.

In 2014, XAIU established the 'Qi Fang Academy of Classical Learning'. The academy teaches a combination of theory and practice with Chinese characteristics (‘College + Academy’-system). It offers moral education, postgraduate education, and liberal arts education. Qi Fang Academy collaborates with various party groups, associations, campus culture, career planning, etc. to further promote student self-management.

In 2017, Xi'an International University opened a new sports center, covering an area of more than 50,000 square meters, making it one of the largest multipurpose sports venues in Northwestern China.

On January 6, 2020, XAIU established Laozi Academy to provide traditional Chinese culture. Laozi Academy is the first traditional cultural education academy in a second-level college named after Laozi. The academy has seven departments: the Department of Chinese Studies, the Department of Chinese Painting, the Department of Chinese Music, the Department of Calligraphy, the Department of Wushu (Kungfu), the Department of Tea Art, and the Department of Chess Art.

== Campus culture ==
=== Values ===
	Values
Vision	"Everyone should be able to embark on a learning experience at any age, in any kind of institution, with any scholar, anywhere in the world."
Mission	"To learn and integrate best academic practices, striding forward and exploring new trails."
Motto	"The fish that evolves into a dragon." (化鱼成龙)
Ethos	"To devote ourselves to education with commitment, gratitude and diligence."

=== Motto ===
The university motto 化鱼成龙 (English: the fish that evolves into a dragon), is the spirit of the campus culture. Legend has that in the university's Yuhua Lake, a fish turned into a dragon.

=== Legend ===
XAIU is located in Yuhuazhai (Yuhua Village), in Xi'an's Yanta District. According to legends, it is the place where Princess Yuhua, daughter of King Wu of the Zhou dynasty, built a stage to offer sacrifices to Heaven (The remains from the Yangshao Civilization, around 5000 – 3000 B.C.). This stage was found during the construction of the campus and a beautiful park was built around that platform. In the Tang dynasty (618 – 907 A.D.), this area was the auspicious place where imperial examination candidates prayed for good luck, hoping that they could be someone useful to society, in other words, "to become a dragon". After that, people changed the name Yuhua 雨花 (English: the flower in rain) into Yuhua 鱼化 (English: the fish evolves). Since then, it is said that whoever comes to this land will achieve their goals and fulfill their aspirations.

== International education ==
XAIU was among the first private universities to deliver international cooperation education and foreign student education in Shaanxi Province. It is cooperating with more than 100 universities around the world and has joint educational programs with the US, Canada, UK, France, Korea, Japan, etc. and has educated over 2,000 international students (mainly for Chinese language learning).

XAIU is also one of the initiators of the Association for Global Advancement of Universities and Colleges (AGAUC).

== Academic research ==
=== Overview ===
XAIU conducts applied researches into the fields of private education development, teaching reforms, academic quality and local economic development. Since 2016, the university has been in the lead among Chinese private universities regarding a number of projects, with mentions from government departments at provincial, ministerial and national levels, and papers published in SCI, SSCI, EI, etc. XAIU is ranked top 15 in the number of patents filed by universities in Shaanxi province.

The Private Education Research Center of XAIU has won several awards from the provincial and state government such as "Advanced Group in National Education System" by China's Ministry of Education, as well as 4 times "Outstanding National Research Institute" by China's Association of Higher Education.

Moreover, the university has:

- completed 70 projects on national, ministerial and provincial levels,
- completed 40 proposals and reports to the national, provincial and municipal government,
- published 20 books including "Private Education in China: Thoughts and Practices"
- hosted 9 international forums and national conferences.

=== Research institutes ===
- Qi Fang Education Research Institute: Shaanxi (HEI) Key Research Base in Philosophy and Social Sciences
- Joint Research Center for "Belt & Road" International Land Port Logistics of Shaanxi Province
- Shaanxi Free Trade Zone Research Institute
- Applied Life Sciences Institute
- Innovation and Entrepreneurship Institute
- Intelligent Control Engineering Research Center

=== Major research results ===
- 80 GHz high frequency millimeter wave flat antenna array system for 5G base relay return
- Integrated intelligent walnut planting base
- Android-based smart home management system
- Amplitude-shift keying (ASK) gig data resource management platform
- Promotion of Zizhou County economy by e-commerce under the mode of university & local region cooperation
- Development plan of ‘’Tongchuan E-commerce Logistics Innovation and Entrepreneurship Park’’

== Awards and achievements ==
Some of Xi'an International University's foremost achievements are:

- In 2009, XAIU was selected as a teaching case representative of China's higher education development model by Harvard Business School
- In 2013, XAIU was awarded the "China Creativity Management Thought"-award by Xinhua News Agency
- In 2015, XAIU was ranked first in the "2015 Chinese Private University Rankings" by Chinese Universities Alumni Association
- In 2016, XAIU became one of the "Top 50 National Universities and Colleges of Outstanding Experiences in Creativity and Entrepreneurship Education", awarded by China's Ministry of Education
- In 2018, XAIU was announced as one of the 3 recipients to receive a "First-Class College" Construction Unit from the Shaanxi Provincial Department of Education
- In 2019, XAIU's guqin heritage preservation program was inducted into the "List of Excellent Chinese Traditional Heritage Preservation Programs of National Universities".
