= Yuhuazhai Subdistrict =

Yuhuazhai Subdistrict 鱼化寨街道
- Subdistrict
- Yuhuazhai Subdistrict in China
- Coordinates: 34°14′05″N 108°51′16″E
- Country: People's Republic of China
- Province: Shaanxi
- Sub-provincial city: Xi'an
- District: Yanta
- Village-level divisions: 3 residential community 10 villages

Population (2010)
  - Total: 127,204
- Time zone: UTC+8 (China Standard)

Yuhuazhai Subdistrict (simplified Chinese: 鱼化寨街道; traditional Chinese: 魚化寨街道; pinyin: Yúhuàzhài Jiēdào) is a subdistrict of Yanta District in the southern suburbs of Xi'an, the capital of Shaanxi province. As of 2010 it has a population of 127,204 people.

== History ==
As of 1949, Yuhuazhai was a township under the jurisdiction of Chang'an County. In 1955, it was placed under the jurisdiction of Epang District (Chinese: 阿房区). In 1958, Yuhuazhai Township became a people's commune, and was renamed to Bayi People's Commune (Chinese: 八一公社) in 1966. In 1972 its name was restored to Yuhuazhai People's Commune, and was reverted to a township in 1984. Yuhuazhai became a subdistrict in 1988.

=== Urban village demolition ===
By the early 2010s, an area including Yuhuazhai Subdistrict was identified as an urban village, nicknamed "Little Hong Kong" (Chinese: 小香港; pinyin: Xiǎo Xiānggǎng), and rumors of its demolition and subsequent reconstruction were first floated in 2012. A 2018 article published by Sina reported that the urban village spanned an area of 3,000 mu, and was home to over 300,000 people. An official notice by the Yuhuazhai Subdistrict government announced plans to demolish the subdistrict's urban village by November 30, 2018, and offered a compensation agreement for residents to sign.

However, the United States government's news agency Radio Free Asia reported later in 2018 that over 1,000 demonstrators held protests in opposition to the demolition on December 2 and December 3. Alleged videos of the protests show riot police firing tear gas and attacking protesting villages, and Radio Free Asia reported that two protestors were injured in the confrontation and eight more were arrested. Protestors interviewed by Radio Free Asia also reported various government workers harassing and attacking residents who continued to occupy undemolished buildings in the weeks prior.

== Administrative divisions ==
As of 2020, Yuhuazhai Subdistrict has three residential communities (社区) and 10 administrative villages under its administration.

=== Residential communities ===
Yuhuazhai Subdistrict's three residential communities are as follows:

- Shuili Community (Chinese: 水利社区)
- Yingfazhai Community (Chinese: 英发寨社区)
- Zhanghuzhai Community (Chinese: 漳浒寨社区)

=== Villages ===
Yuhuazhai Subdistrict's ten administrative villages are as follows:

- Yuhuazhai Village (Chinese: 鱼化寨村)
- Xiaoyanzhuang Village (Chinese: 小烟庄村)
- Laoyanzhuang Village (Chinese: 老烟庄村)
- Hejiazhai Village (Chinese: 贺家寨村)
- Shuangqizhai Village (Chinese: 双旗寨村)
- Xichao Village (Chinese: 西晁村)
- Dongchao Village (Chinese: 东晁村)
- Xinfeng Village (Chinese: 新丰村)
- Zhousongzhai Village (Chinese: 周宋寨村)
- Leijiazhai Village (Chinese: 雷家寨村)

== Demographics ==
According to the 2010 Chinese Census, Yuhuazhai Subdistrict has a population of 127,204 people, more than double the population of 60,281 reported in the 2000 Chinese Census. A 1996 estimate put Yuhuazhai Subdistrict's population at about 37,000 people.

== Economy ==
The subdistrict is home to a number of factories.

== Transport ==
- Yuhuazhai station on Line 3, Xi'an Metro

== See also ==
- List of township-level divisions of Shaanxi
