= Tang Paradise =

Tang-themed cultural park in Xi'an, China

Coordinates: 34°12′54″N 108°58′09″E

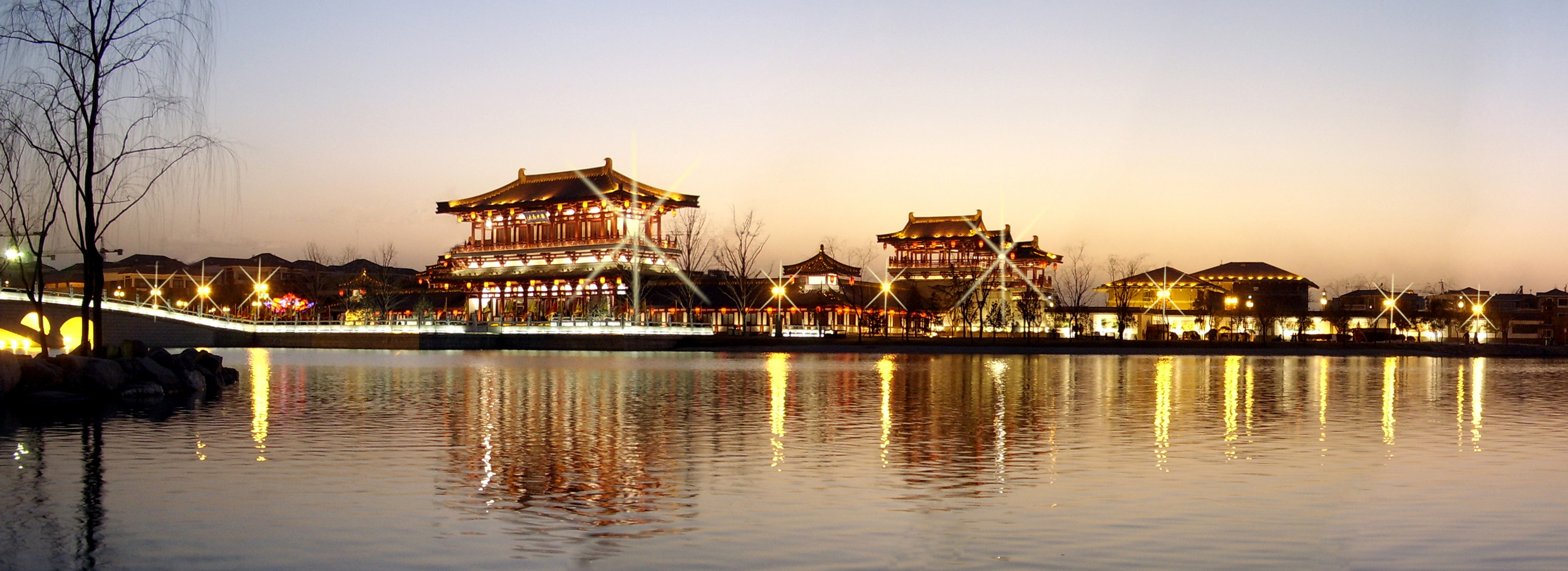
Tang Paradise at night

Tang Paradise (simplified Chinese: 大唐芙蓉园; traditional Chinese: 大唐芙蓉園; pinyin: Dàtáng Fúróng Yuán) is a modern cultural theme park in Yanta District, Xi'an, Shaanxi, China. It stands near the historic Qujiang Pool and Furong Garden area of Chang'an, the capital of the Tang dynasty. The park is not a complete reconstruction of the ancient imperial garden; its layout and buildings are modern interpretations of Tang architectural and court culture.

Construction began in 2002 and the park opened in 2005. A large lake forms the centre of the grounds, surrounded by gardens and Tang-style buildings including Ziyun Tower. Visitor facilities include exhibitions, seasonal festivals, theatrical performances, and an evening lake show using fountains, lighting, and water-screen projection. Together with the nearby Giant Wild Goose Pagoda, Grand Tang Mall, and Qujiang heritage sites, the park forms part of Xi'an's main cultural tourism district.

== External Category ==
- http://www.tangparadise.cn/
