= Longshouyuan station =

Metro station in Xi'an, China

Longshouyuan 龙首原
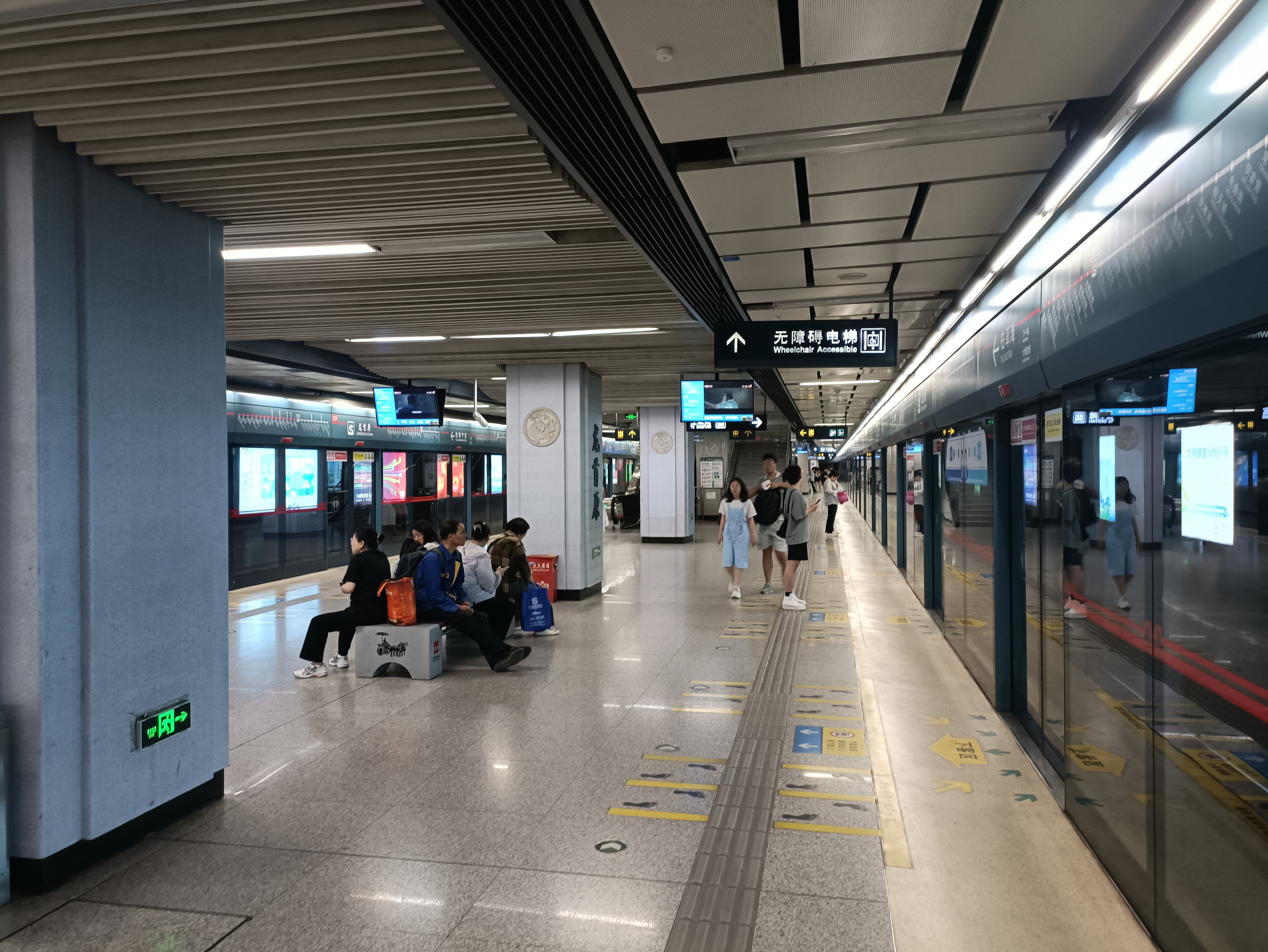

General information
- Location: Xincheng District, Xi'an, Shaanxi; China
- Coordinates: 34.2936°N 108.9425°E
- Operated by: Xi'an Metro Co. Ltd.
- Line: Line 2
- Platforms: 2 (1 island platform)

Construction
- Structure type: Underground

History
- Opened: 16 September 2011

Services
Preceding station	Xi'an Metro	Following station
Daminggongxi towards Caotan	Line 2	Anyuanmen towards Changninggong
Location

Longshouyuan station (Chinese: 龙首原站) is a station of Line 2 of the Xi'an Metro. It started operations on 16 September, 2011.
