= Daminggongxi station =

Metro station in Xi'an, China

Daminggongxi 大明宫西
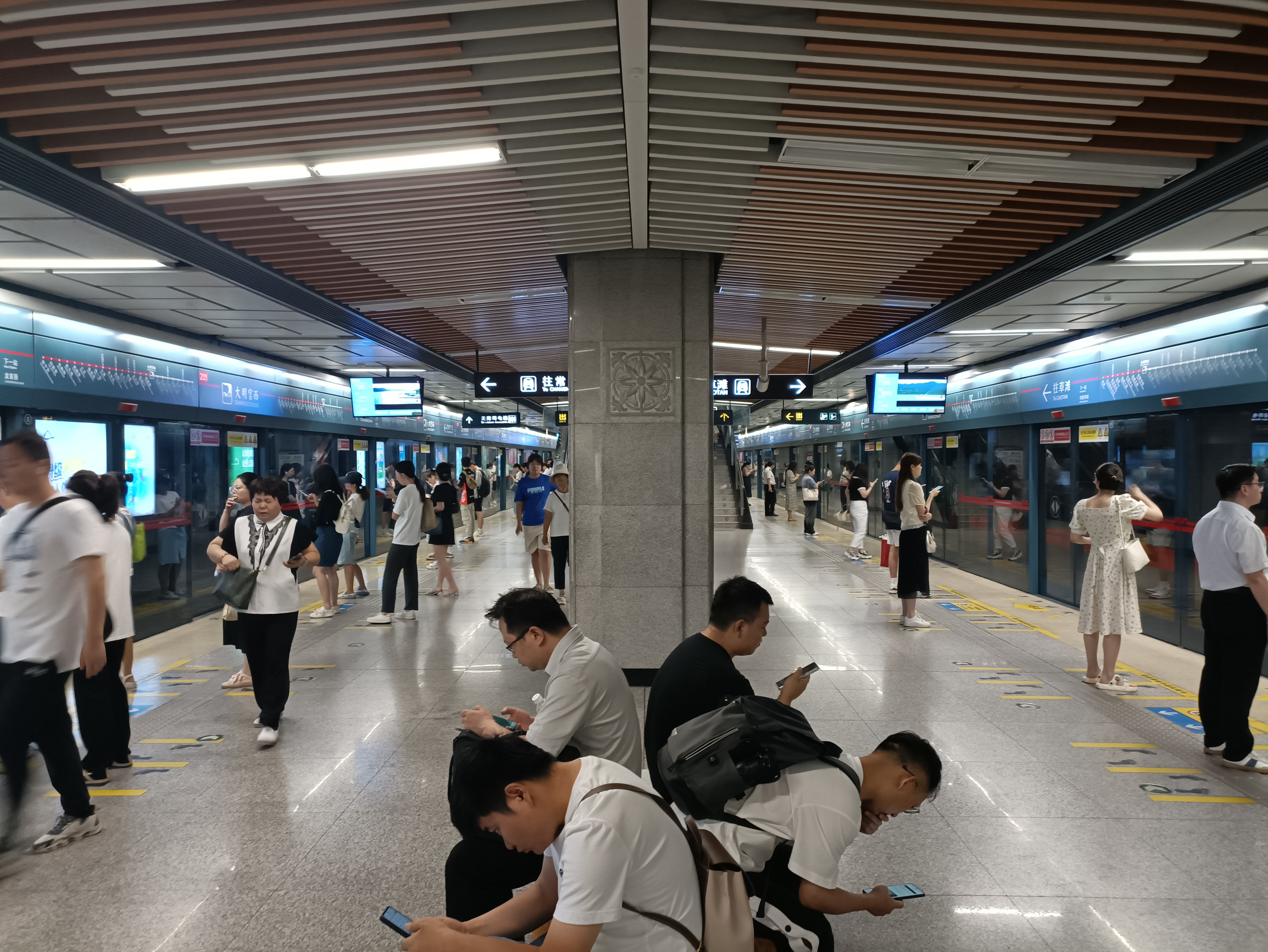

General information
- Location: Weiyang Road × Xuanwu Road & Xuanwu West Road; Weiyang District, Xi'an, Shaanxi; China
- Coordinates: 34°18′23″N 108°56′33″E
- Operated by: Xi'an Metro Co. Ltd.
- Line: Line 2
- Platforms: 2 (1 island platform)

Construction
- Structure type: Underground

History
- Opened: 16 September 2011

Services
Preceding station	Xi'an Metro	Following station
Qingshaonianzhongxin towards Caotan	Line 2	Longshouyuan towards Changninggong
Location

Daminggongxi station (Chinese: 大明宫西站) is a station of Line 2 of the Xi'an Metro. It started operations on 16 September 2011.
