= Fengcheng 10 Lu station =

Metro station in Xi'an, China

Coordinates: 34.35396°N 108.94302°E

Fengcheng 10 Lu 凤城十路
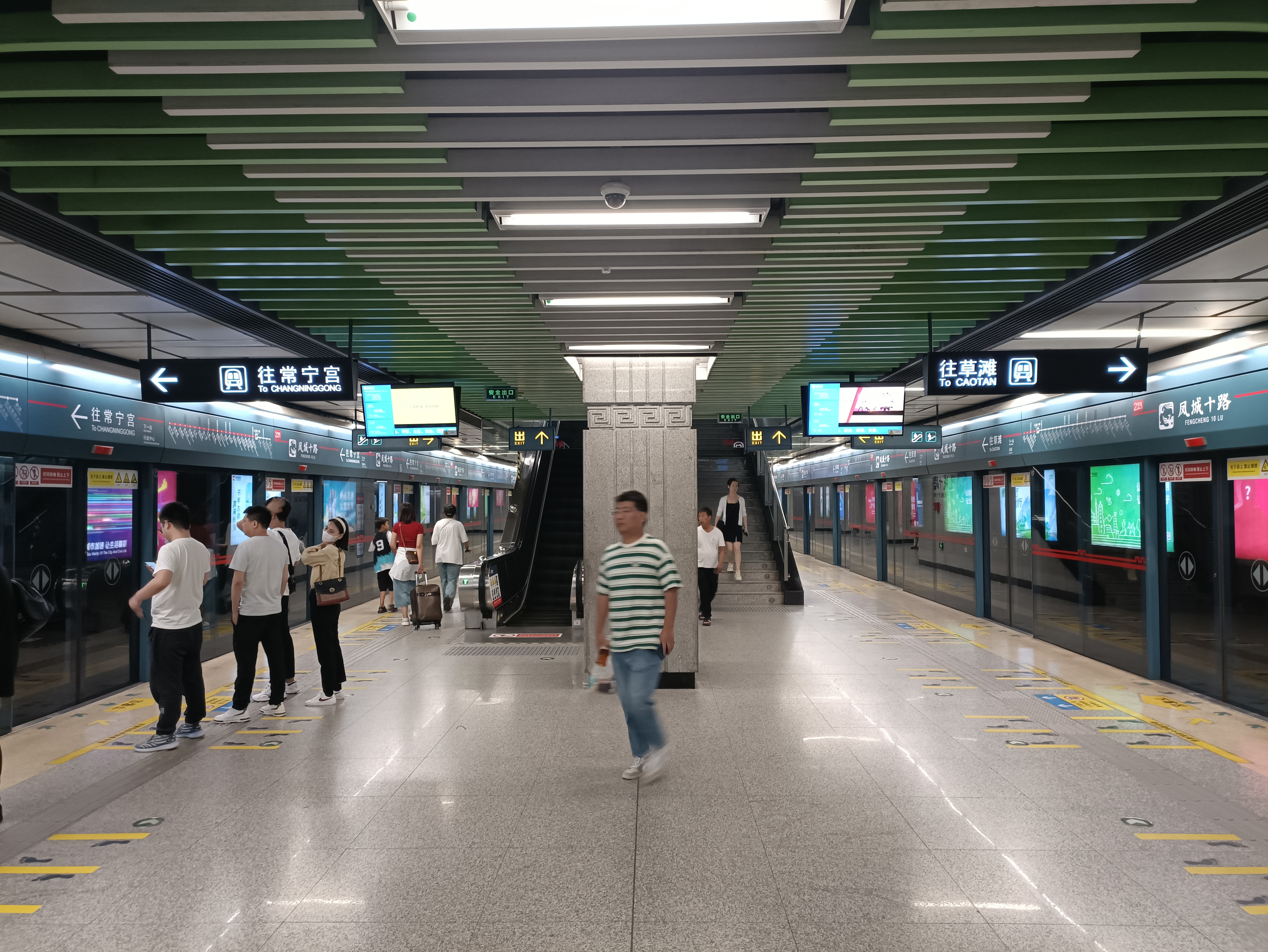

General information
- Other names: Yundong Gongyuan (before 2023)
- Location: Weiyang District, Xi'an, Shaanxi; China
- Operated by: Xi'an Metro Co. Ltd.
- Line: Line 2
- Platforms: 2 (1 island platform)

Construction
- Structure type: Underground

History
- Opened: 16 September 2011

Services
| Preceding station | Xi'an Metro | Following station |
|---|---|---|
| Beiyuan towards Caotan | Line 2 | Xingzhengzhongxin towards Changninggong |
Location

Fengcheng 10 Lu station (Chinese: 凤城十路站; pinyin: Fèngchéng Shí Lù zhàn; lit. 'Fengcheng 10th Road station'), formerly known as Yundong Gongyuan station, is a station of Line 2 of the Xi'an Metro. It started operations on 16 September 2011, and renamed to Fengcheng 10 Lu station in June 2023.
