= Hejiaying station =

Metro station in Xi'an, China

Hejiaying 何家营
- Platform

Chinese name
- Traditional Chinese: 何家營
- Simplified Chinese: 何家营
Transcriptions
Standard Mandarin
- Hanyu Pinyin: Héjiāyíng
- Wade–Giles: Ho^{2}-chia^{1}-ing^{2}
- IPA: [xɤ̌.tɕjá.ǐŋ]

General information
- Location: Chang'an District, Xi'an, Shaanxi; China
- Operator: Xi'an Metro Co. Ltd.
- Line: Line 2
- Platforms: 2 (1 island platform)

Construction
- Structure type: Underground

History
- Opened: 27 June 2023

Services
Preceding station	Xi'an Metro	Following station
Weiqunan towards Caotan	Line 2	Changninggong Terminus
Location

Hejiaying station (Chinese: 何家营站) is a station of Line 2 of the Xi'an Metro located in Xi'an's Chang'an District. It started operations on 27 June 2023.

== Station layout ==
G	Exits	Exits A–C
L1; Concourse	Lobby	Customer service, ticket machines, ticket gates, Chang'an Card machines
L2; Platforms	arrow for L	2 towards Caotan (Weiqunan)
L2; Platforms	Island platform, doors open on the left
L2; Platforms	arrow for R	2 towards Changninggong (terminus)

== Exits ==
Designation	Nearby landmarks	Image
A	Changning Avenue (W), Shenhe Second Road (N)	
B	Changning Avenue (W), Shenhe Second Road (N)	
C	Changning Avenue (E)	

== Gallery ==
Concourse, 2023
