= Line 2 (Xi'an Metro) =

Metro line in Xi'an, China

- 2
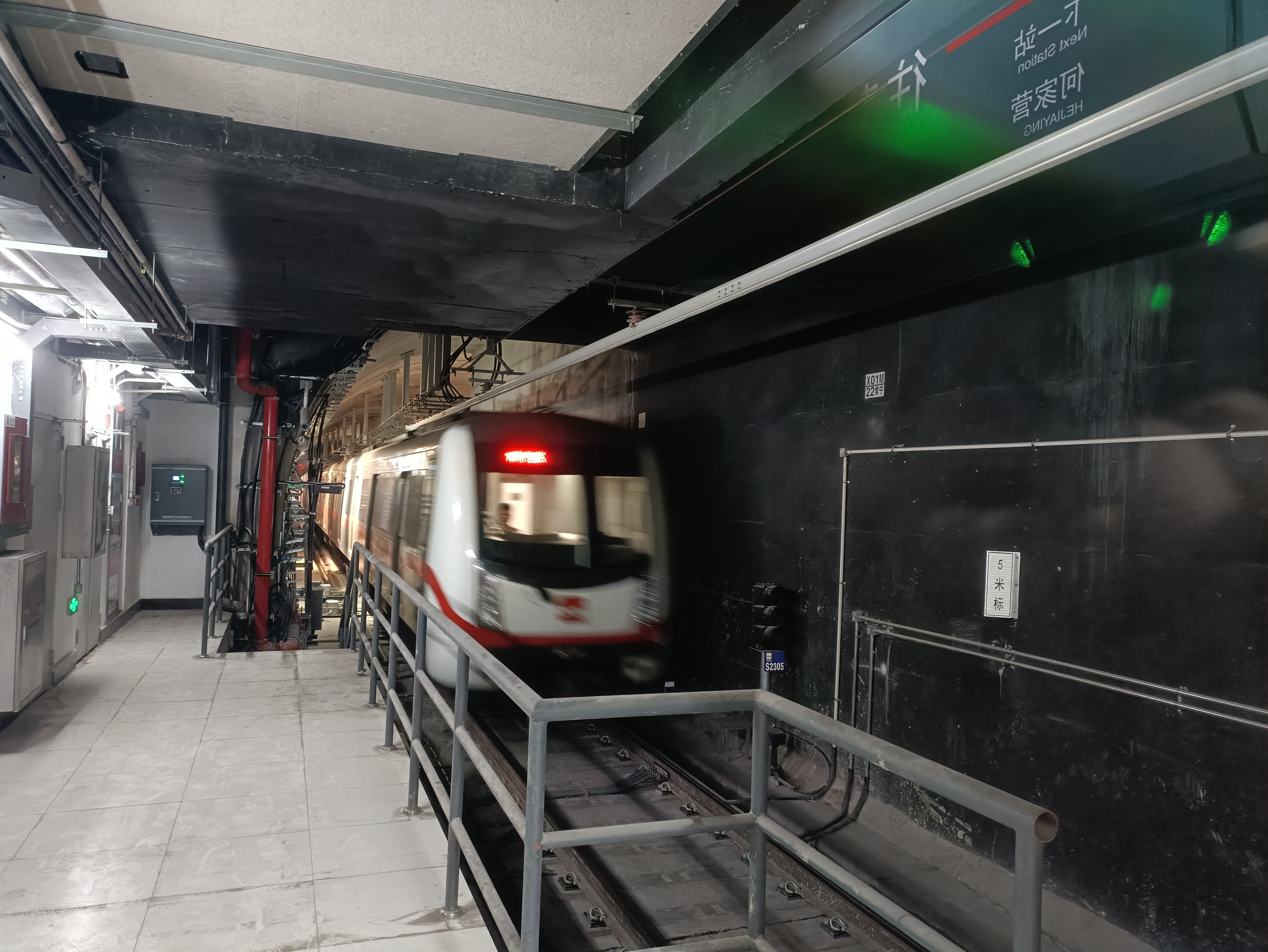
- A train of Xi'an Metro Line 2

Overview
- Status: Operational
- Owner: Xi'an
- Locale: Xi'an, Shaanxi, China
- Termini: Caotan; WEIQUNAN (Weiqu South) Changninggong
- Stations: 25

Service
- Type: Rapid transit
- System: Xi'an Metro
- Services: 1
- Operator(s): Xi'an Metro Corporation
- Rolling stock: CRRC Changchun DKZ27; CRRC Changchun DKZ75
- Daily ridership: 1.253 million (2021 record)

History
- Opened: 16 September 2011; 14 years ago

Technical
- Line length: 33.637 km (20.901 mi)
- Number of tracks: 2
- Character: Underground
- Track gauge: 1,435 mm (4 ft 8 1/2 in)
- Loading gauge: Type B (2.8 metres)
- Operating speed: 80 km/h (50 mph)

Line 2 of the Xi'an Metro (Chinese: 西安地铁二号线; pinyin: Xī'ān Dìtiě Èr Hào Xiàn) is a rapid transit line in Xi'an, Shaanxi Province, China, running from north to south. The line is 33.637 km (20.901 mi) long with 25 stations. The line is colored red on system maps.

== History ==
=== Phase 1 ===
Phase 1 of Line 2 was opened on 16 September 2011 and extended to Weiqunan station on 16 June 2014.

=== Phase 2 ===
Phase 2 of Line 2 (both Northern and Southern extension) started construction October 31 October 2019, and opened on 27 June 2023.

=== Opening timeline ===
Segment	Commencement	Length	Station(s)	Name
Xi'an Beizhan — Dianshita	16 September 2011	26.715 km (16.600 mi)	17	Phase 1 (initial section)
Dianshita — Weiqunan	16 June 2014	26.715 km (16.600 mi)	4	Phase 1 (final section)
Xi'an Beizhan — Caotan	27 June 2023	3.505 km (2.178 mi)	2	Phase 2 (North section)
Weiqunan — Changninggong	27 June 2023	3.417 km (2.123 mi)	2	Phase 2 (South section)

== Stations (north to south) ==
Station name		Connections	Distance km		Location
English (Pinyin)	Chinese	Connections	Distance km		Location
Caotan	草滩				Weiyang
Honghuiyiyuan Beiqu	红会医院北区				Weiyang
Xi'an Beizhan (Note: formerly Beikezhan station (北客站), transfer gateway with line 4 and line 14 opened on 25 June 2021, renamed to Xi'an Beizhan on 20 September 2022.)	西安北站	4 14; EAY	0.000	0.000	Weiyang
Beiyuan	北苑		1.610	1.610	Weiyang
Fengcheng 10 Lu (Note: formerly Yundong Gongyuan station.)	凤城十路		1.112	2.722	Weiyang
Xingzhengzhongxin	行政中心	4	1.264	3.985	Weiyang
Fengcheng 5-lu	凤城五路		1.239	5.224	Weiyang
Qingshaonianzhongxin (Note: formerly Shitushuguan station.)	青少年中心	8	1.351	6.574	Weiyang
Daminggongxi	大明宫西		1.397	7.971	Weiyang
Longshouyuan	龙首原		1.460	9.432	Xincheng
Anyuanmen	安远门		1.191	10.623	Xincheng
Beidajie	北大街	1	1.256	11.878	Xincheng
Zhonglou	钟楼	6	0.989	12.868	Beilin
Yongningmen	永宁门		1.416	14.284	Beilin
Nanshaomen	南稍门	5	0.907	15.191	Beilin
Tiyuchang	体育场		0.869	16.060	Beilin
Xiaozhai	小寨	3	1.062	17.121	Yanta
Balicun (Note: formerly Wei 1 Jie station.)	八里村		1.137	18.258	Yanta
Dianshita (Note: formerly Huizhanzhongxin station.)	电视塔	8	1.611	19.868	Yanta
Sanyao	三爻		1.714	21.583	Yanta
Fengqiyuan	凤栖原		1.540	23.123	Chang'an
Hangtiancheng	航天城	15	1.212	24.334	Chang'an
Weiqunan	韦曲南		1.798	26.132	Chang'an
Hejiaying	何家营				Chang'an
Changninggong	常宁宫				Chang'an
