= Honghuiyiyuan Beiqu station =

Metro station in Xi'an, China

Honghuiyiyuan Beiqu 红会医院北区
- Exit A

Chinese name
- Traditional Chinese: 紅會醫院北區
- Simplified Chinese: 红会医院北区
- Literal meaning: Red Cross Hospital north campus
Transcriptions
Standard Mandarin
- Hanyu Pinyin: Hónghuì yīyuàn běiqū
- Wade–Giles: Hung^{2}-hui^{4} i^{1}-yüan^{4} pei^{3}-ch'ü^{1}
- IPA: [xʊ̌ŋ.xwêɪ í.ɥɛ̂n pèɪ.tɕʰý]

General information
- Location: Weiyang District, Xi'an, Shaanxi; China
- Coordinates: 34.3951°N 108.9411°E
- Operator: Xi'an Metro Co. Ltd.
- Line: Line 2
- Platforms: 2 (1 island platform)

Construction
- Structure type: Underground
- Accessible: Yes

History
- Opened: 27 June 2023

Services
Preceding station	Xi'an Metro	Following station
Caotan Terminus	Line 2	Xi'an Beizhan towards Changninggong
Location

Honghuiyiyuan Beiqu station (Chinese: 红会医院北区站; lit. 'Red Cross Hospital north campus station') is a metro station served by Line 2 of the Xi'an Metro. The station opened on 27 June 2023.
