= Beiyuan station (Xi'an Metro) =

Metro station in Xi'an, China

Beiyuan 北苑
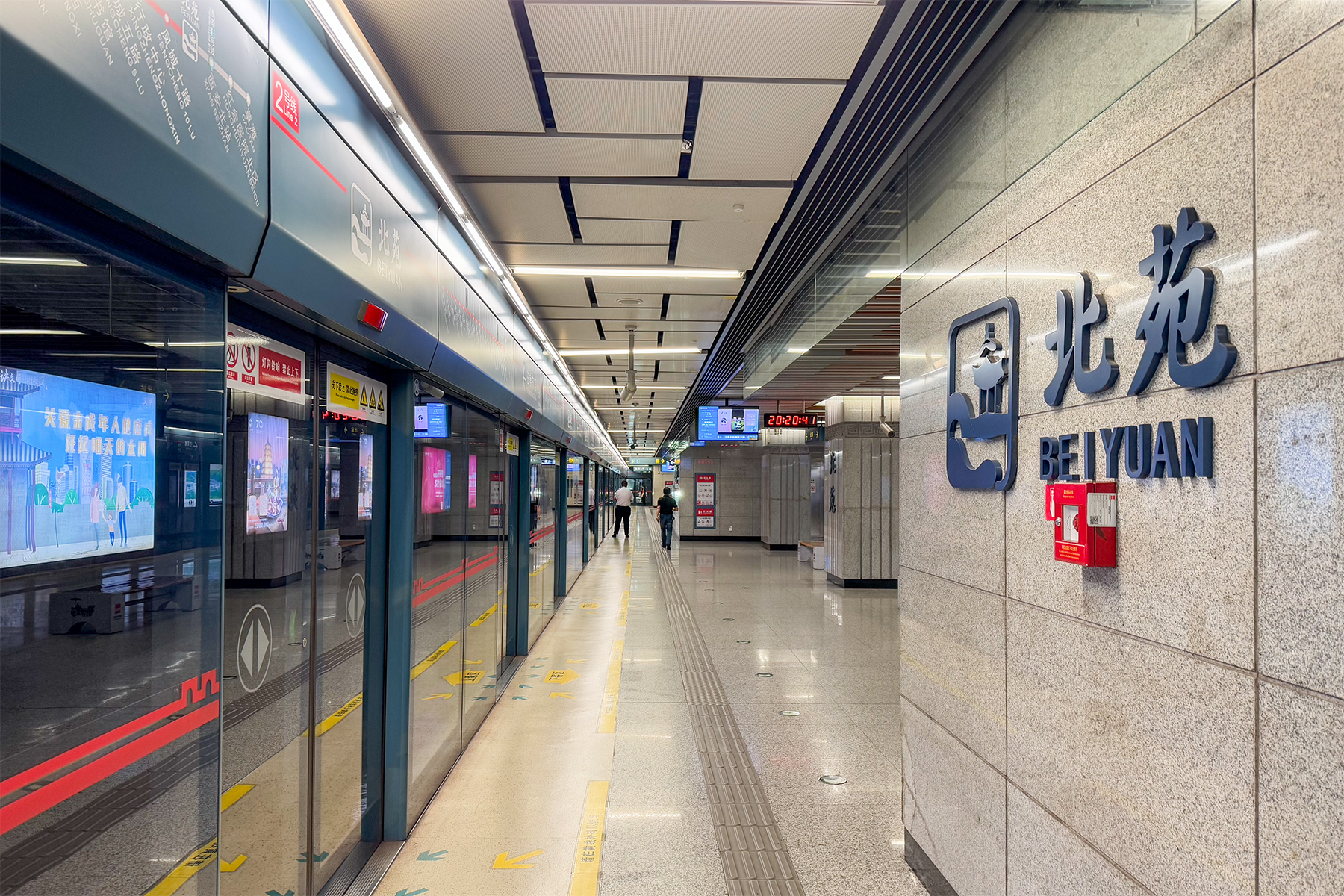

General information
- Location: Weiyang District, Xi'an, Shaanxi; China
- Coordinates: 34.3635°N 108.9405°E
- Operated by: Xi'an Metro Co. Ltd.
- Line: Line 2
- Platforms: 2 (1 island platform)

Construction
- Structure type: Underground

History
- Opened: 16 September 2011

Services
Preceding station	Xi'an Metro	Following station
Xi'an Beizhan towards Caotan	Line 2	Fengcheng 10 Lu towards Changninggong
Location

Beiyuan station (Chinese: 北苑站) is a station of Line 2 of the Xi'an Metro. It started operations on 16 September 2011.
