= Fengcheng 5-lu station =

Metro station in Shaanxi, China

Fengcheng 5-lu 凤城五路
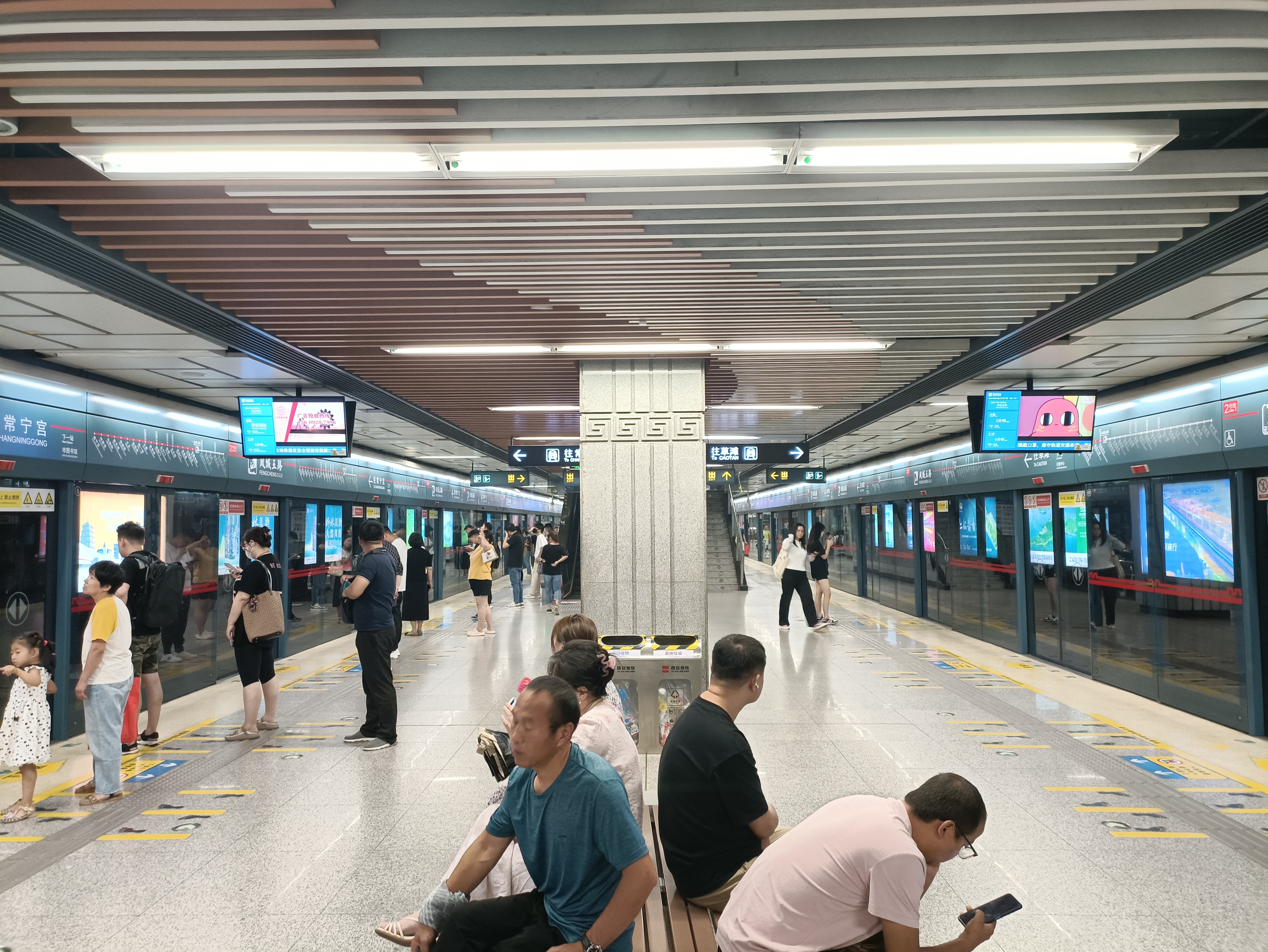

General information
- Location: Weiyang Road × Fengcheng 5th Road; Weiyang District, Xi'an, Shaanxi; China
- Coordinates: 34°19′53″N 108°56′33″E
- Operated by: Xi'an Metro Co. Ltd.
- Line: Line 2
- Platforms: 2 (1 island platforms)

Construction
- Structure type: Underground
- Accessible: Yes

History
- Opened: 16 September 2011

Services
Preceding station	Xi'an Metro	Following station
Xingzheng Zhongxin towards Caotan	Line 2	Qingshaonianzhongxin towards Changninggong
Location

Fengcheng 5-lu station (simplified Chinese: 凤城五路站; traditional Chinese: 鳳城五路站) is a station of Line 2 of the Xi'an Metro. It started operations on 16 September 2011.
