= Anyuanmen station =

Railway station in Xi'an, China

Anyuanmen 安远门
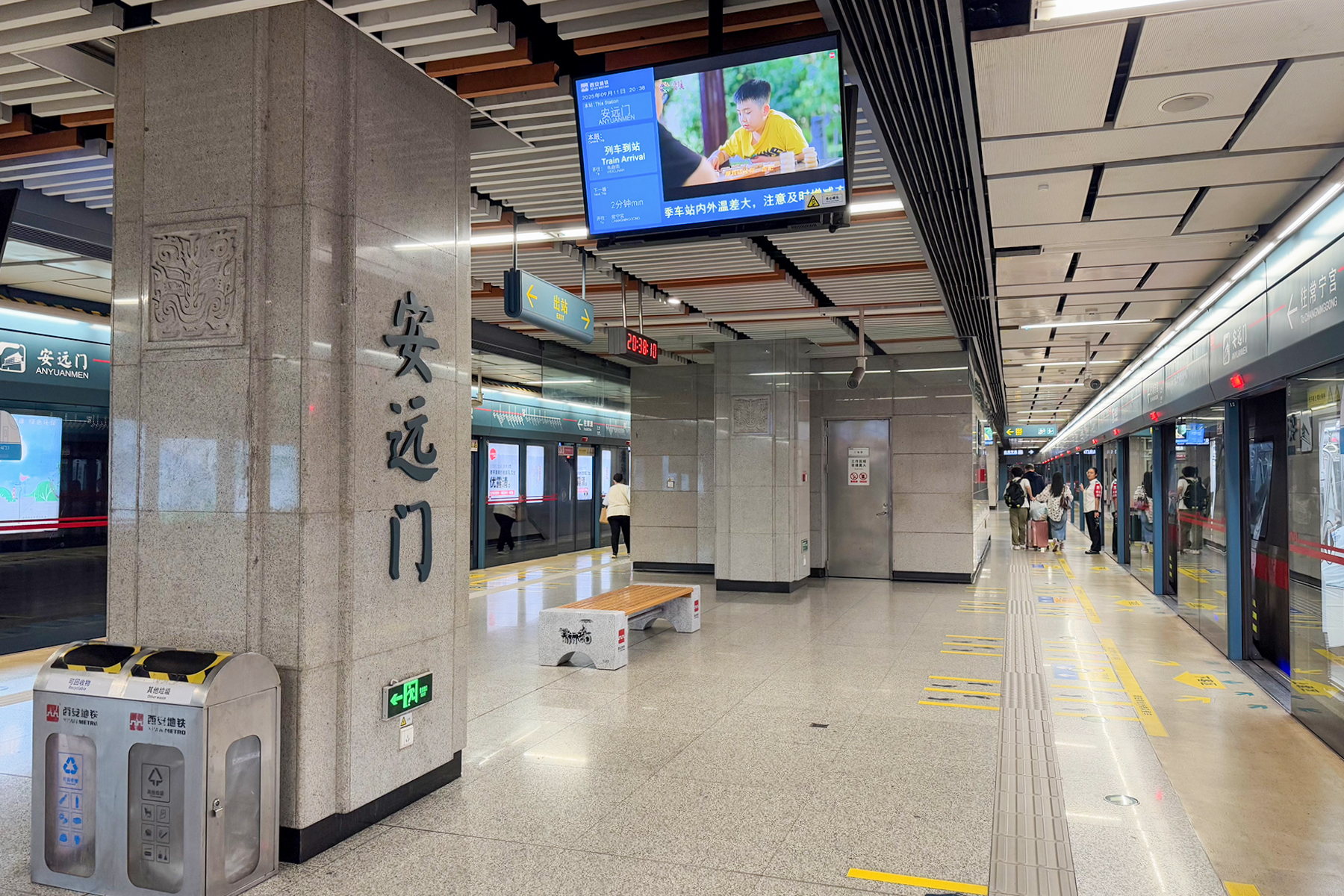

General information
- Location: Xincheng District, Xi'an, Shaanxi; China
- Coordinates: 34°16′56″N 108°56′33″E
- Operated by: Xi'an Metro Co. Ltd.
- Line: Line 2
- Platforms: 2 (1 island platform)

Construction
- Structure type: Underground

History
- Opened: 16 September 2011

Services
Preceding station	Xi'an Metro	Following station
Longshouyuan towards Caotan	Line 2	Beidajie towards Changninggong
Location

Anyuanmen station (Chinese: 安远门站) is a station of Line 2 of the Xi'an Metro. It started operations on 16 September 2011.
