= High School Affiliated to Shaanxi Normal University =

Secondary school in China

- Chinese: 陕西师范大学附属中学
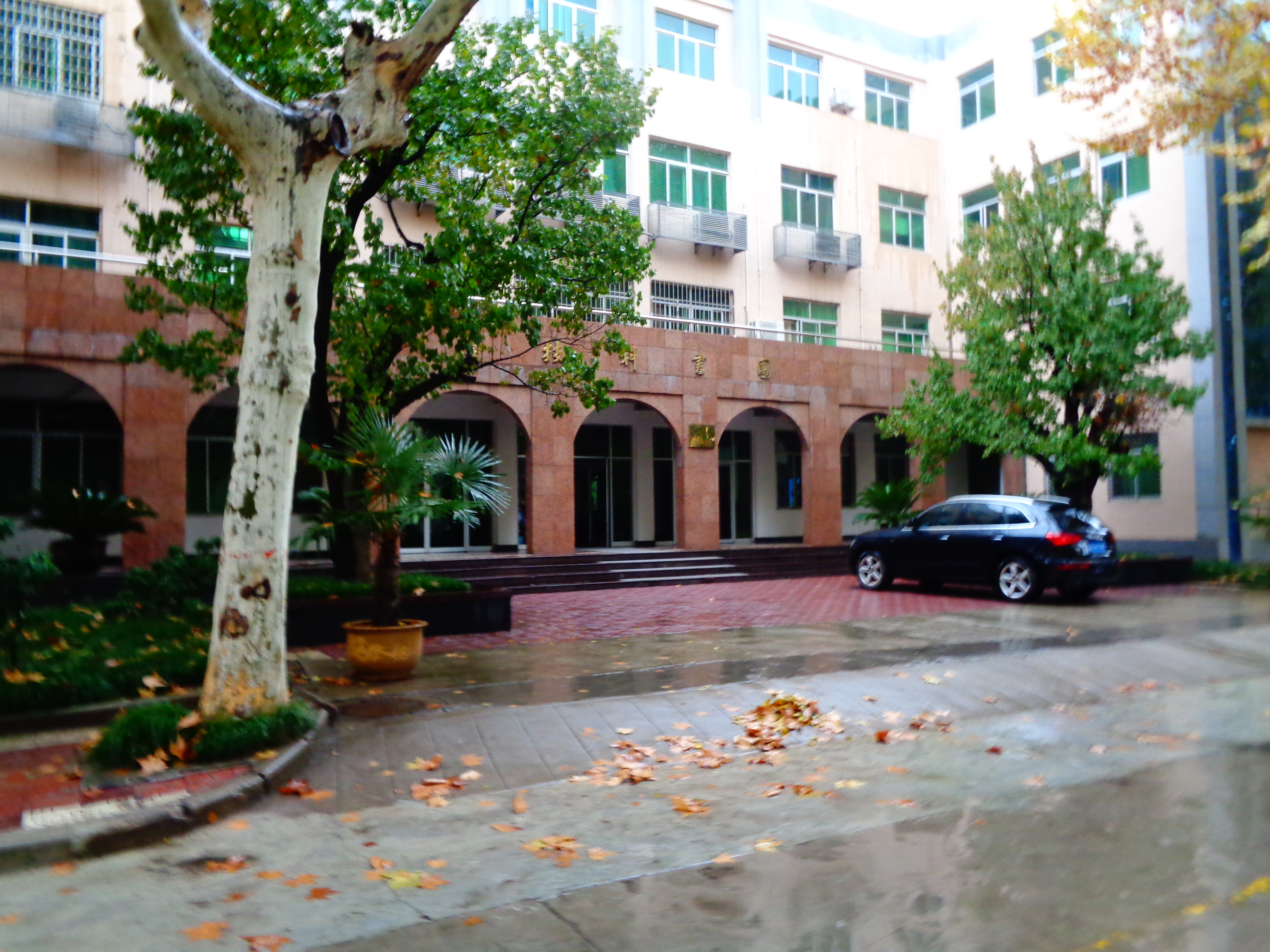

Information
- Other names: Shanxi Normal University High School; Shanxi Normal University High School; First Shanxi Normal University High School
- Established: 1910; 116 years ago
- Enrollment: c.3000
- Affiliation: Shaanxi Normal University
- Website: www.sdfz.com.cn

Shanxi Normal University Affiliated High School (Chinese: 陕西师范大学附属中学, abbr 陕师大附中), also known as Shanxi Normal University High School, Shanxi Normal University High School, and First Shanxi Normal University High School, is Xi'an's eighty-fourth high school.

== History ==
Its predecessor was founded in 1910. It was modeled on two small private schools and a German school. The Ministry of Education is the only one in the northwest region directly under the Normal Colleges Affiliated High School, Shaanxi Province. University High School became part of the National Education Consortium in 1991. The founding members were Fujian Normal University High School, Yunnan Normal University High School, Hunan Normal University High School, Shaanxi Normal University High School, High School, Nankai University, Liaoning Normal University High School; High School, Capital Normal University and Shandong Normal Junior High School (joined later).

== Campus ==
The campus area is over one hundred and ten mu (equivalent to more than 70,000 square meters), with a construction area of 42,000 square meters, including teaching, office, laboratory and library technology space. The school offers 68 classes. The school enrolls more than 3,000 students. More than 80% of the campus is covered in trees, such as cedar, Zhuahuai, sycamore, magnolia and other trees.

Normal University High School was one of the schools that founded "Love the Birds Week" in Xi'an in 1991, a science campaign to protect wildlife in Xi'an.

School teachers include 96 senior teachers, a national model teacher, national training experts, specialist training teachers, two national backbone teachers, 7 provincial backbone teachers, 16 provincial and municipal teaching masters. Doctoral students (including reading) number 6, postgraduate (including reading) number 86 people and Master of Education (including reading) number 48.
