= Tiyuchang station =

Metro station in Xi'an, China

Coordinates: 34.2339°N 108.9422°E

Tiyuchang 体育场
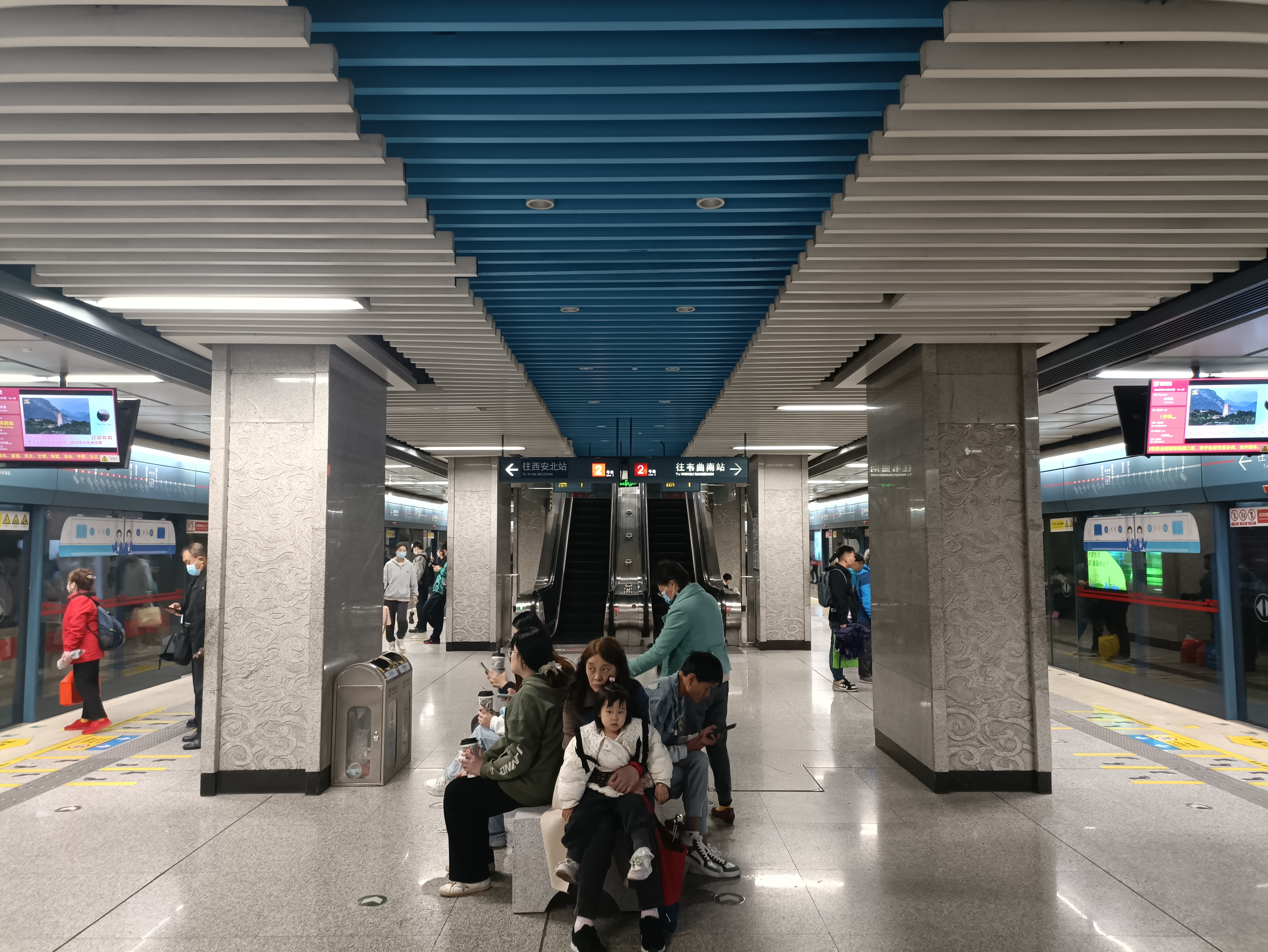

General information
- Location: Beilin District, Xi'an, Shaanxi; China
- Operated by: Xi'an Metro Co. Ltd.
- Line: Line 2
- Platforms: 2 (1 island platform)

Construction
- Structure type: Underground

History
- Opened: 16 September 2011

Services
| Preceding station | Xi'an Metro | Following station |
|---|---|---|
| Nanshaomen towards Caotan | Line 2 | Xiaozhai towards Changninggong |
Location

Tiyuchang station (Chinese: 体育场站) is a station of Line 2 of the Xi'an Metro. It started operations on 16 September 2011.
