= Airport W. (T1, T2, T3) station =

Metro station in Xi'an, China

Airport W. (T1, T2, T3) 机场西（T1、T2、T3）
- Heshao-bound platform

Chinese name
- Traditional Chinese: 機場西（T1、T2、T3）
- Simplified Chinese: 机场西（T1、T2、T3）
Transcriptions
Standard Mandarin
- Hanyu Pinyin: Jīchǎng xī
- Wade–Giles: Chi^{1}-ch‘ang^{3} hsi^{1}
- IPA: [tɕí.ʈʂʰàŋ ɕí]

General information
- Location: Weicheng District, Xianyang, Shaanxi; China
- Operator: Xi'an Metro Co. Ltd.
- Line: Line 14
- Platforms: 2 side platforms

Construction
- Structure type: Underground

History
- Opened: 29 September 2019

Services
Preceding station	Xi'an Metro	Following station
Terminus	Line 14	Airport (T5) towards Heshao
Location

Airport W. (T1, T2, T3) station (Chinese: 机场西（T1、T2、T3）站) is a station of Line 14 of the Xi'an Metro located in Xianyang's Weicheng District. It started operations on 29 September 2019.

The station serves terminals 1, 2 and 3 of Xi'an Xianyang International Airport, and is one of the two that serve the airport, with the other being Airport (T5) station, serving terminal 5. The two airport stations are the only two on the Xi'an Metro network to have their names translated to English, rather than fully rendered in romanisation.

== Station layout ==
G	Exits	Exits A2, B, C1
L1; Concourse	Lobby	Customer service, ticket machines, ticket gates, Chang'an Card machines, exits A1, C2
L2; Platforms	Side platform, doors open on the right
L2; Platforms	arrow for L	14 termination platform
L2; Platforms	arrow for R	14 towards Heshao (Airport (T5))
L2; Platforms	Side platform, doors open on the right

== Exits ==
Designation	Nearby landmarks	Image
A1	Terminal 3, terminal 3 parking lot	
A2	Terminal 3	
B	Ground transportation center, outdoor parking lot	
C1	Outdoor parking lot	
C2	Terminals 1, 2	
