= Weicheng District, Xianyang =

Coordinates: 34°19′11″N 108°42′44″E

Weicheng 渭城区
- District
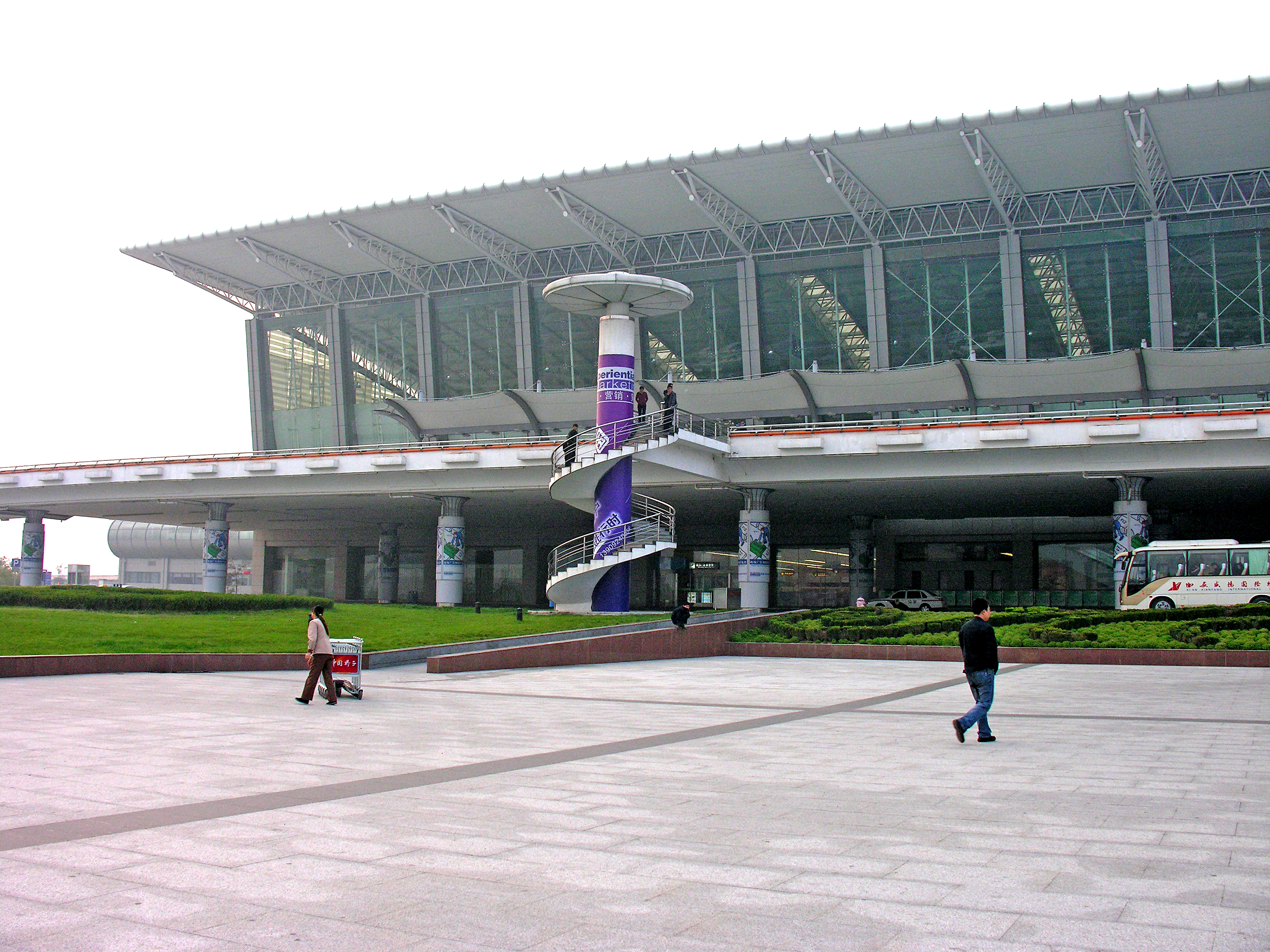
- Xi'an Xianyang International Airport, Dizhang Subdistrict

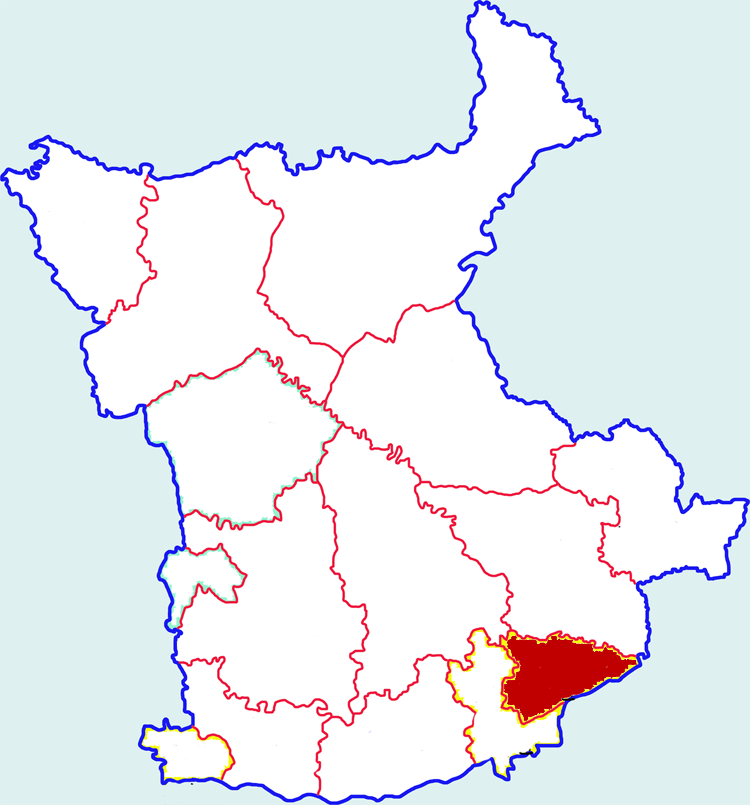
- Weicheng District within Xianyang

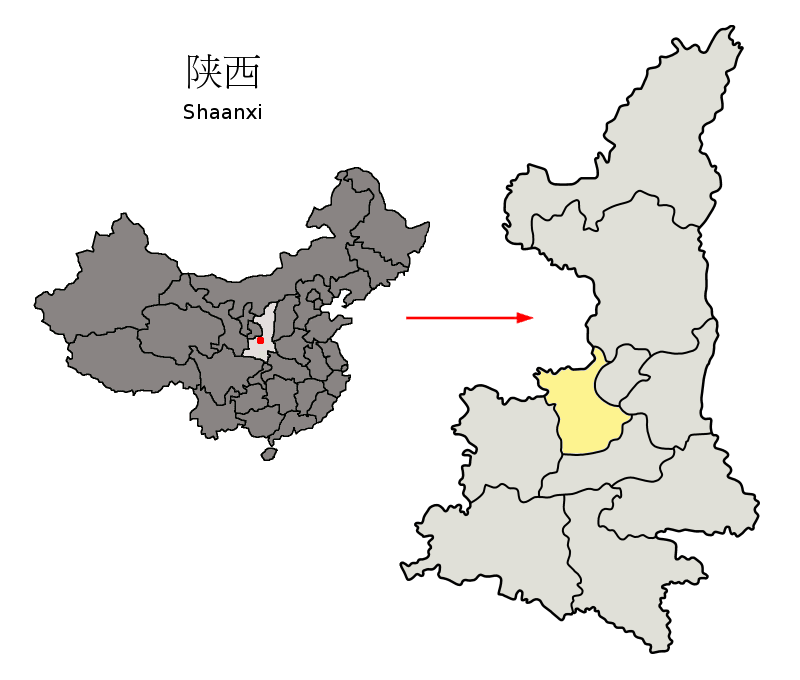
- Xianyang in Shaanxi
- Country: People's Republic of China
- Province: Shaanxi
- Prefecture-level city: Xianyang

Area
  - Total: 272 km^{2} (105 sq mi)

Population (2017)
  - Total: 216,000
  - Density: 794/km^{2} (2,060/sq mi)
- Time zone: UTC+8 (China standard time)
- Website: www.weic.gov.cn

Weicheng District (simplified Chinese: 渭城区; traditional Chinese: 渭城區; pinyin: Wèichéng Qū) is a district of Xianyang, Shaanxi, China.

The district is notable for a number of Zhou and Han era tombs.

== History ==
The area belonged to the Cheng, also known as the state of Ying (Chinese: 郢国; pinyin: Yǐng Guó), during the Shang dynasty. The Cheng state, which included northern portions of present-day Weicheng District, was settled by the descendants of Wu Hui sometime between 16th and 14th centuries BCE. Present-day Yaodian Subdistrict was the site of a fief of the Cheng state.

During the Zhou dynasty, King Wen oversaw the expansion of the dynasty to the west of the Feng River, into present-day Xianyang. Him and King Wu were buried in a complex known as the Zhou tombs, located in present-day Zhouling Subdistrict. The complex contains two ancestral halls dedicated to the kings, as well as over 40 steles, which were erected in their honor during the Song dynasty.

== Administrative divisions ==
Weicheng District administers the following 10 subdistricts:

- Zhongshan Subdistrict (Chinese: 中山街道)
- Wenhui Road Subdistrict (Chinese: 文汇路街道)
- Xinxing Subdistrict (Chinese: 新兴街道)
- Weiyang Subdistrict (Chinese: 渭阳街道)
- Weicheng Subdistrict (Chinese: 渭城街道)
- Yaodian Subdistrict (Chinese: 窑店街道)
- Zhengyang Subdistrict (Chinese: 正阳街道)
- Zhouling Subdistrict (Chinese: 周陵街道; lit. 'Zhou tomb Subdistrict')
- Dizhang Subdistrict (Chinese: 底张街道)
- Beidu Subdistrict (Chinese: 北杜街道)
