= Xi'an Beizhan station =

Metro station in Xi'an, China

Xi'an Beizhan 西安北站
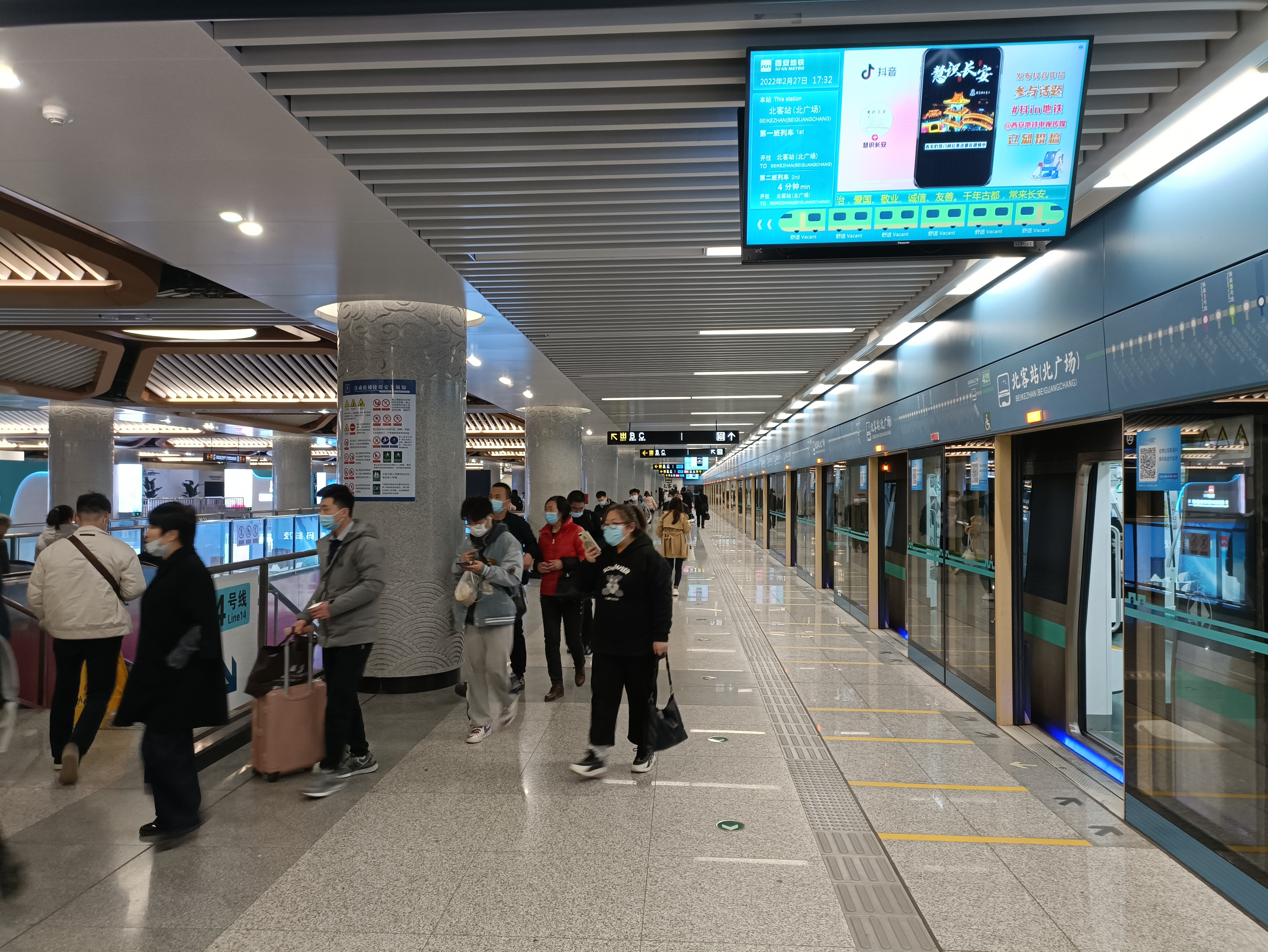
- Line 4 termination platform

Chinese name
- Chinese: 西安北站
- Literal meaning: Xi'an North railway station
Transcriptions
Standard Mandarin
- Hanyu Pinyin: Xī'ān běi zhàn
- Wade–Giles: Hsi^{1}-an^{1} pei^{3} chan^{4}
- IPA: [ɕí.án pèɪ ʈʂân]

General information
- Location: Xi'an North railway station Weiyang District, Xi'an, Shaanxi; China
- Coordinates: 34°23′N 108°56′E
- Operator: Xi'an Metro Co. Ltd.
- Lines: Line 2 Line 4 Line 14
- Platforms: 6 (2 island platforms, 2 side platforms)
- Connections: Xi'an North

Construction
- Structure type: Underground
- Accessible: Yes

History
- Opened: Line 2: 16 September 2011; Line 4: 26 December 2018; Line 14: 29 September 2019
- Former names: Line 2: Beikezhan 北客站 Line 4, Line 14: Beikezhan (Beiguangchang) 北客站（北广场）

Services
Preceding station	Xi'an Metro	Following station
Honghuiyiyuan Beiqu towards Caotan	Line 2	Beiyuan towards Changninggong
Terminus	Line 4	Yuandinglu towards Hangtianxincheng
Weihenan towards Airport W. (T1, T2, T3)	Line 14	Wenjingshangongyuan towards Heshao
Location

Xi'an Beizhan station (Chinese: 西安北站; lit. 'Xi'an North railway station') is a metro station served by Line 2, Line 4 and Line 14 of Xi'an Metro. The station opened on 16 September 2011.

== History ==
=== Chronology ===
- 16 September 2011: Beikezhan station began operations along with Line 2.
- 26 December 2018: Beikezhan (Beiguangchang) station began operations along with Line 4. Transfer between Beikezhan and Beikezhan (Beiguangchang) stations had to be facilitated via an out-of-station interchange.
- 29 September 2019: The Airport Intercity Line (now Line 14) began operations to Beikezhan (Beiguangchang) station.
- 2021: An elevated passageway was constructed between Beikezhan and Beikezhan (Beiguangchang) stations, connecting the two.
- 20 September 2022: Both stations are renamed to simply Xi'an Beizhan station.

== Station layout ==
G	Exits	Exits A–D
M	Transfer lobby	Connecting level between 2 lobby and shared lobby
L1	14 lobby	Customer service, ticket machines, ticket gates, Chang'an Card machines, passageway to exits A, D
L1	Side platform, doors open on the right
L1	arrow for L	14 towards Airport W. (T1, T2, T3) (Weihenan)
L1	arrow for R	14 towards Heshao (Wenjingshangongyuan)
L1	Island platform, doors open on the right
L1	arrow for L	4 towards Hangtianxincheng (Yuandinglu)
L1	arrow for R	4 termination platform
L1	Side platform, doors open on the left
L1	4 lobby	Customer service, ticket machines, ticket gates, Chang'an Card machines, passageway to exits B, C
L1	2 lobby	Customer service, ticket machines, ticket gates, Chang'an Card machines, passageway to Xi'an North railway station
L2	Shared lobby	Customer service, ticket machines, ticket gates, Chang'an Card machines, Xi'an Xianyang International Airport customer service center
L2	arrow for L	2 towards Caotan (Honghuiyiyuan Beiqu)
L2	Island platform, doors open on the left
L2	arrow for R	2 towards Changninggong (Beiyuan)

== Station artworks ==
Shared lobby art wall Wudong Shaanxi (舞动陕西; May 2023)

Line 4 lobby art wall Da Mei Xi'an (大美西安; February 2018)

Muxiong (木熊), statue located in the shared lobby, gifted to Xi'an by the city of Kouvola, Finland in April, 2021. (August 2023)

== Exits ==
The station has a total of nine exits. The four exits of the Lines 4 and 14 station are marked A to D, while the Line 2 station's exits are unmarked. All Line 2 exits connect to the basement level of Xi'an North railway station.

Line 2 station west-side exit (July 2023)

Line 2 station south-side exit (July 2023)

Line 2 station southeast-side exit (July 2023)

Line 2 station northeast-side exit (July 2023)

Designation	Nearby landmarks	Image
A	Qinhan Avenue, Wenjing Road, Mingguang Road, Xi'an North railway station north square (NW)	
B	High-speed rail Xi'an North railway station north square, Yuanguang West Road	
C	Xi'an North railway station north square (SE), north square, Yuanguang East Road	
D	Xi'an North railway station north square (NE), Qinhan Avenue, Wenjing Road, Jianyuan Road, Wenjingshan Park	

== Gallery ==
Station icon (August 2023)

Lines 4 and 14 lobby (April 2025)

Shared lobby floor plan (August 2023)

Line 2 platform (July 2023)

Transfer passageway; the Line 2 station's north side exits are lined to the sides (July 2023)

Line 2 lobby (April 2025)

Line 4 Hangtianxincheng-bound platform (December 2020)

Lines 4 and 14 island platform (August 2023)

Line 14 Airport W. (T1, T2, T3)–bound platform (August 2023)

Line 14 Heshao-bound platform (February 2022)

Notice of last Lines 4 and 14 trains in the Line 2 lobby (August 2023)

Xi'an Xianyang International Airport customer service center (August 2023)
