= Yanta, Xi'an =

Yanta 雁塔区
- District
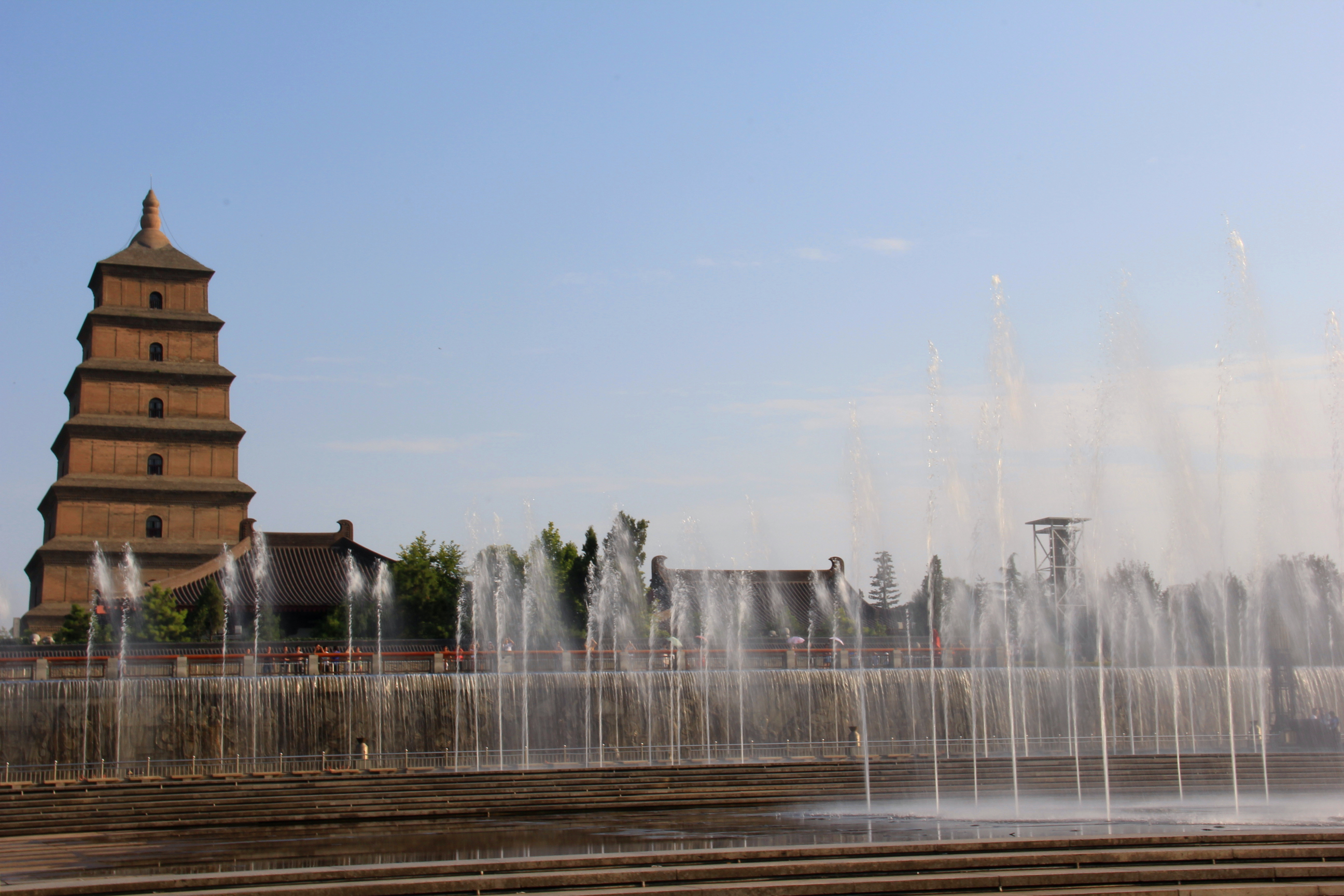
- Giant Wild Goose Pagoda square, is a symbol of Yanta District and Xi'an
- Interactive map of Yanta
- Coordinates: 34°12′38″N 108°55′58″E
- Country: People's Republic of China
- Province: Shaanxi
- Sub-provincial city: Xi'an
- Subdistricts: 8

Area
  - Total: 152 km^{2} (59 sq mi)

Population (2020)
  - Total: 1,202,038
  - Density: 7,910/km^{2} (20,500/sq mi)
- Time zone: UTC+8 (China Standard)
- Postal code: 710000
- Licence plates: 陕A
- Website: www.yanta.gov.cn

Yanta District (simplified Chinese: 雁塔区; traditional Chinese: 雁塔區; pinyin: Yàntǎ Qū) is one of 11 urban districts of the prefecture-level city of Xi'an, the capital of Shaanxi Province, Northwest China. The district borders the districts of Weiyang to the north, Lianhu, Beilin and Xincheng to the northeast, and Chang'an to the south.

== Geography ==
=== Administrative Divisions ===
Yanta District administers ten subdistricts:

Name	Chinese (S)	Hanyu Pinyin
Xiaozhailu Subdistrict	小寨路街道	Xiǎozhàilù Jiēdào
Dayanta Subdistrict	大雁塔街道	Dàyàntǎ Jiēdào
Changyanbu Subdistrict	长延堡街道	Chángyánbǔ Jiēdào
Dianzicheng Subdistrict	电子城街道	Diànzichéng Jiēdào
Dengjiapo Subdistrict	等驾坡街道	Děngjiàpō Jiēdào
Yuhuazhai Subdistrict	鱼化寨街道	Yúhuàzhài Jiēdào
Zhangbagou Subdistrict	丈八沟街道	Zhàngbāgōu Jiēdào
Qujiang Subdistrict	曲江街道	Qǔjiāng Jiēdào
Ducheng Subdistrict	杜城街道	Dùchéng Jiēdào
Zhanghuzhai Subdistrict	漳浒寨街道	Zhānghǔzhài Jiēdào

== Education ==
International schools in the district include:

- Xi'an International School
- Xi'an Hanova International School

High school in the district include:

- High School Affiliated to Shaanxi Normal University

Universities in the district include:

- Xi'an International University
- Xi'an Jiaotong University (XJTU)
- Chang'an University
- Xidian University
- Xi'an University of Posts & Telecommunications (西安邮电大学)

== See also ==
- Qujiang New District
