= Tang dynasty art =

Art of the Tang dynasty

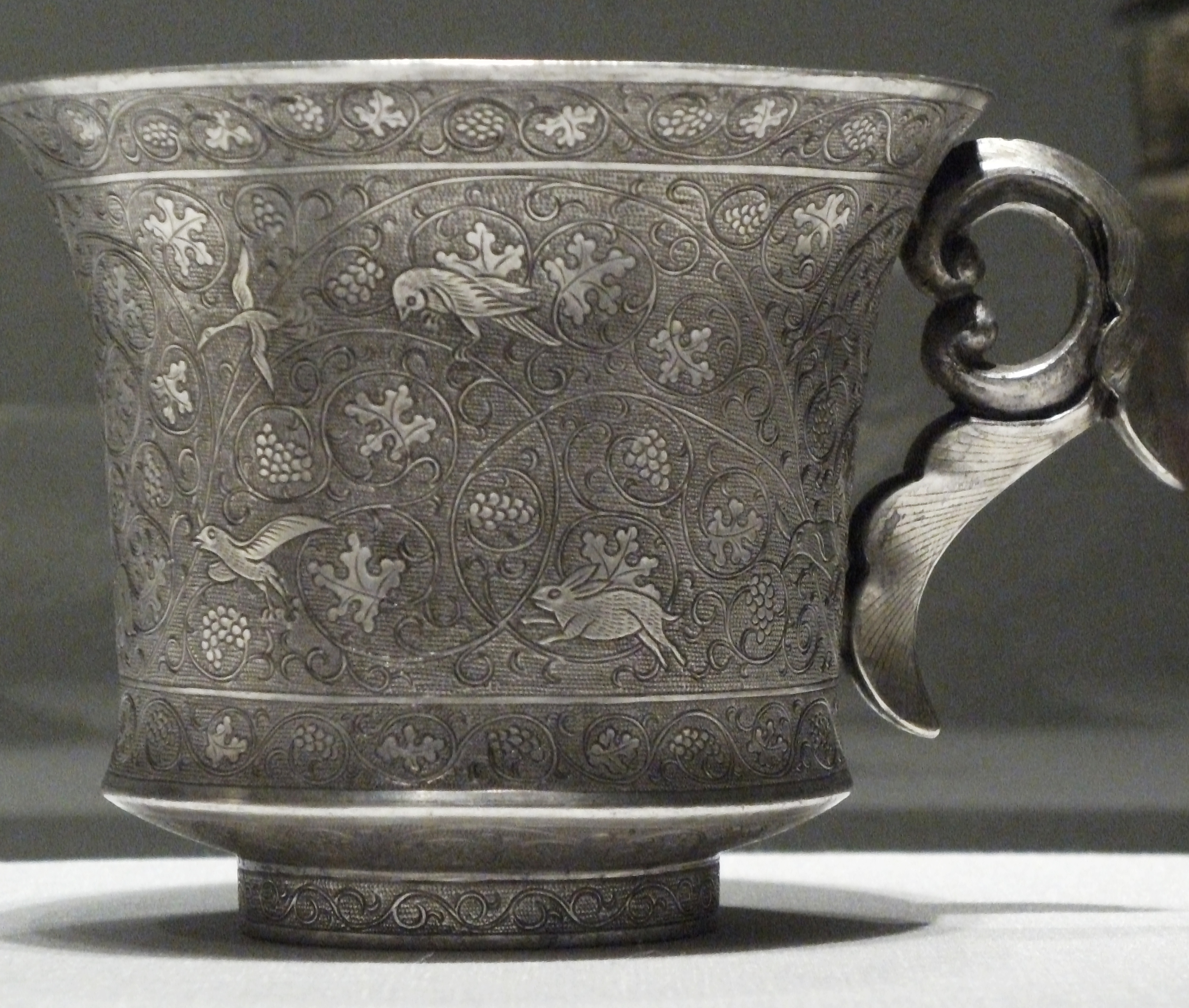
Silver wine cup, with birds and a rabbit amid scrolling plant forms.

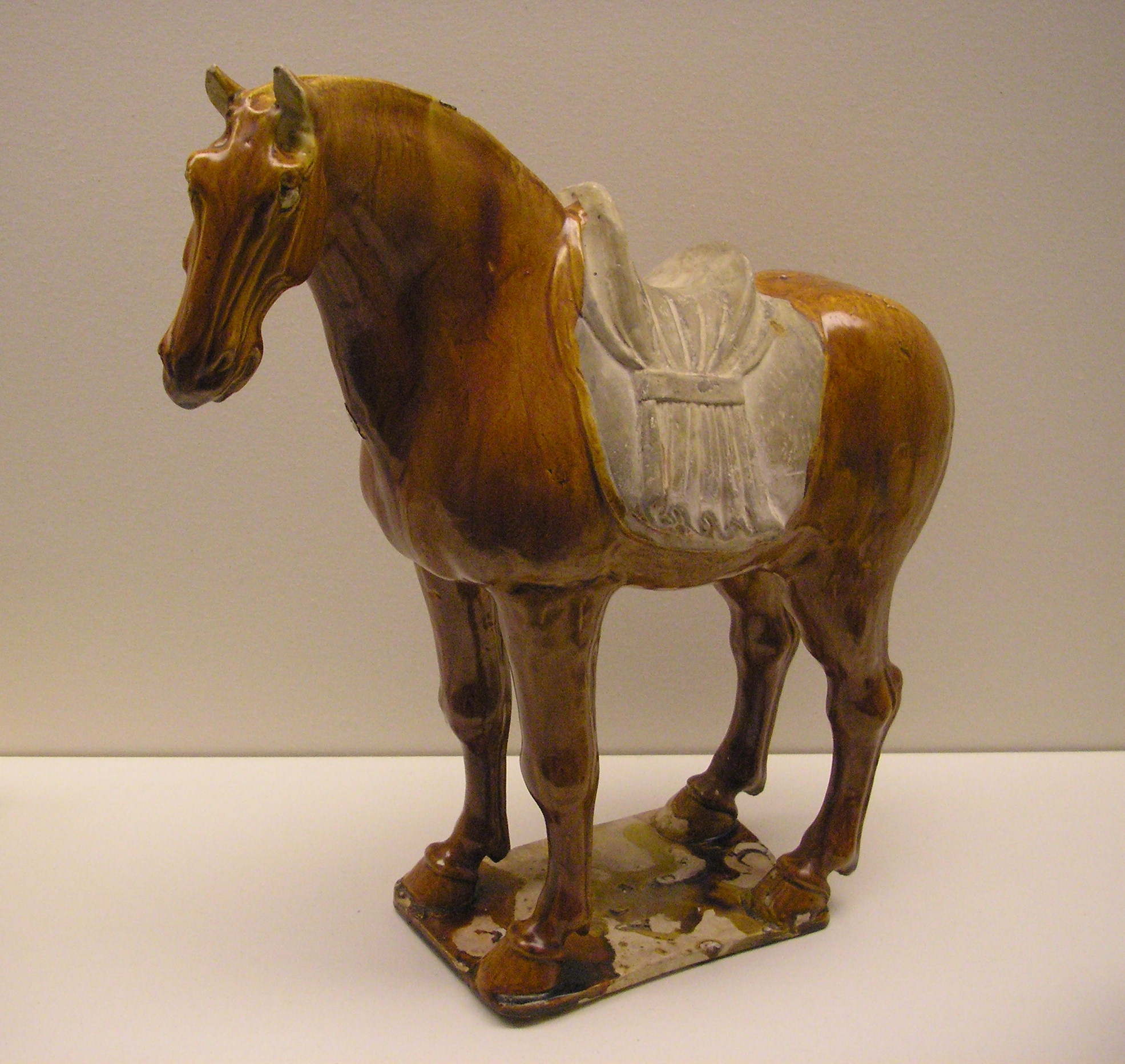
Tang dynasty tomb figure

Tang dynasty art (simplified Chinese: 唐朝艺术; traditional Chinese: 唐朝藝術) refers to Chinese art created during the Tang dynasty (618–907). The period saw significant advancements in arts such as painting, sculpture, calligraphy, music, dance, and literature. During the Tang dynasty, the capital city Chang'an (today's Xi'an), was the most populous city in the known world, and the era is generally regarded by historians as a high point in Chinese civilization and a golden age of Chinese literature and art.

In several areas developments during the Tang set the direction for many centuries to come. This was especially so in pottery, with glazed plain wares in celadon green and whitish porcelaineous types brought to a high level, and exported on a considerable scale. In painting, the period saw the peak level of Buddhist painting, and the emergence of the landscape painting tradition known as shanshui (mountain-water) painting.

Trading along the Silk Road of various products increased cultural diversity in small China cities. Stimulated by contact with India and the Middle East, the empire saw a flowering of creativity in many fields. Buddhism, originating in what is modern day India around the time of Confucius, continued to flourish during the Tang period and was adopted by the imperial family, becoming thoroughly sinicized and a permanent part of Chinese traditional culture. Block printing made the written word available to vastly greater audiences.

Culturally, the An Lushan Rebellion of 745-763 weakened the confidence of the elite, and brought an end to the lavish style of tomb figures, as well as reducing the outward-looking culture of the early Tang, that was receptive to foreign influences from further west in Asia. The Great Anti-Buddhist Persecution, in fact against all foreign religions, which reached its peak in 845, had a great impact on all the arts, but especially the visual arts, greatly reducing demand for artists.

== Painting ==
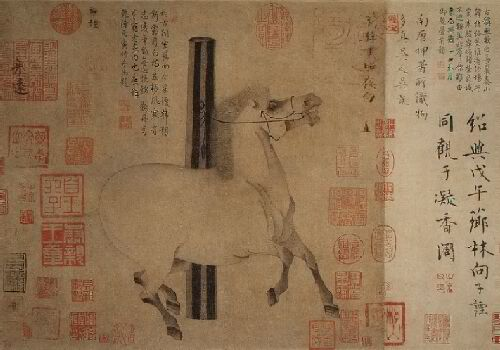
Night-Shining White, a handscroll attributed to Han Gan (active 742–756).

A considerable amount of literary and documentary information about Tang painting has survived, but very few works, especially of the highest quality. There is a good deal of biographical information and art criticism, mostly from later periods such as the Ming dynasty, several centuries after the Tang; the accuracy of this needs to be considered, and much of it was probably already based on seeing copies of the art, not originals. With a very few exceptions, traditional attributions of particular scroll paintings to Tang masters are now regarded with suspicion by art historians.

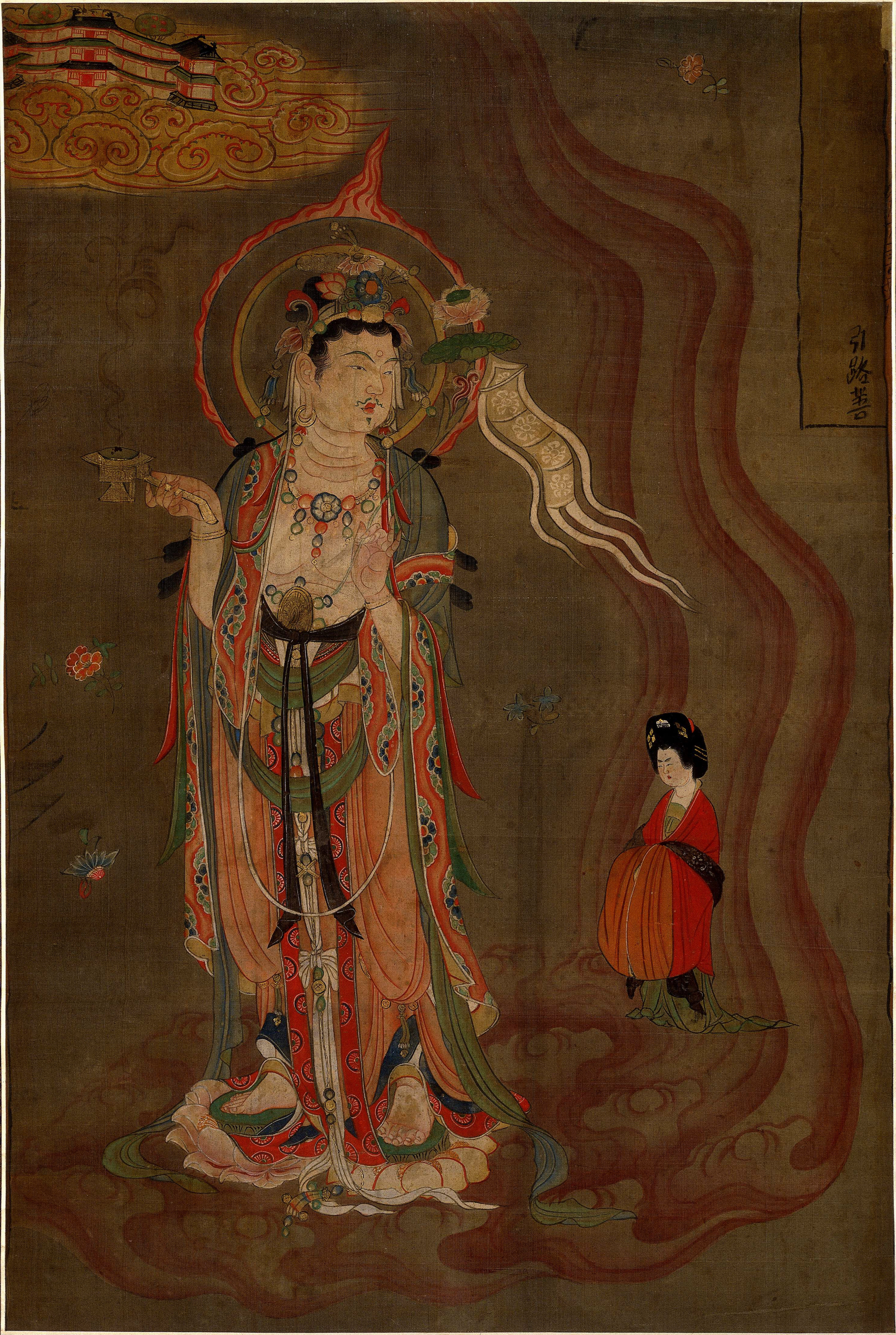
Tang painting from Dunhuang

A walled-up cave in the Dunhuang (Mogao Caves) complex was discovered by Aurel Stein, which contained a vast haul, mostly of Buddhist writings, but also some banners and paintings, making much the largest group of paintings on silk to survive. These are now in the British Museum and elsewhere. They are not of court quality, but show a variety of styles, including those with influences from further west. As with sculpture, other survivals showing Tang style are in Japan, though the most important, at Nara, was very largely destroyed in a fire in 1949.

The rock-cut cave complexes and royal tombs also contain many wall-paintings; the paintings in the Qianling Mausoleum are the most important group of the latter, mostly now removed to a museum. Not all the royal tombs have yet been opened. Court painting mostly survives in what are certainly or arguably copies from much later, such as Emperor Taizong Receiving the Tibetan Envoy, probably a later copy of the 7th century original by Yan Liben, though the front section of the famous portrait of the Emperor Xuanzong's horse Night-Shining White is probably an original by Han Gan of 740–760. Yan Liben is an example of a famous painter who was also a very important official.

Most Tang artists outlined figures with fine black lines and used brilliant color and elaborate detail filling in the outlines. However, Wu Daozi used only black ink and freely painted brushstrokes to create ink paintings that were so exciting that crowds gathered to watch him work. From his time on, ink paintings were no longer thought to be preliminary sketches or outlines to be filled in with color. Instead, they were valued as finished works of art.

The Tang dynasty saw the maturity of the landscape painting tradition known as shanshui (mountain-water) painting, which became the most prestigious type of Chinese painting, especially when practiced by amateur scholar-official or "literati" painters in ink-wash painting. In these landscapes, usually monochromatic and sparse, the purpose was not to reproduce exactly the appearance of nature but rather to grasp an emotion or atmosphere so as to catch the "rhythm" of nature.

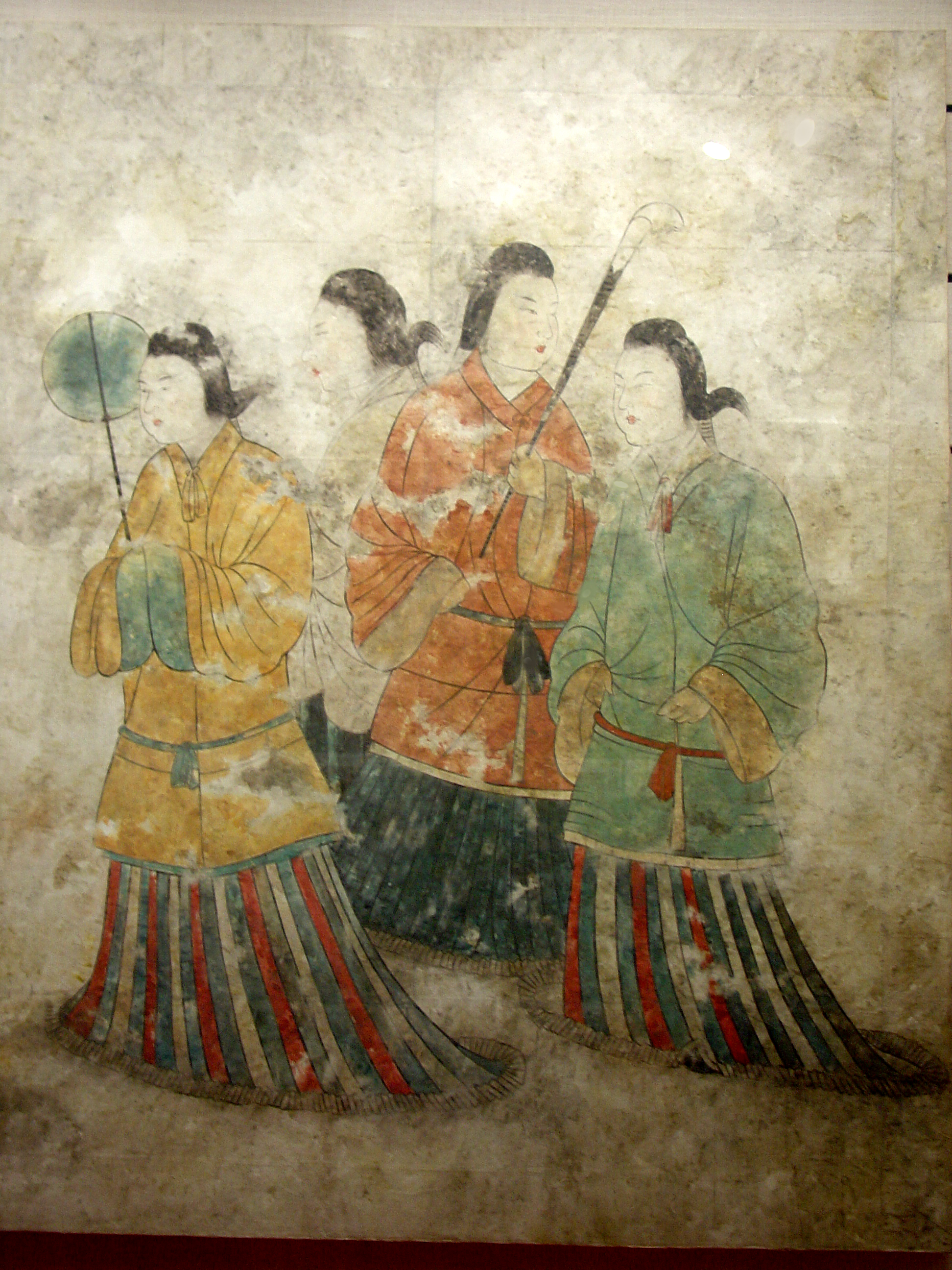
Early Tang period palace maids, Shensi History Museum

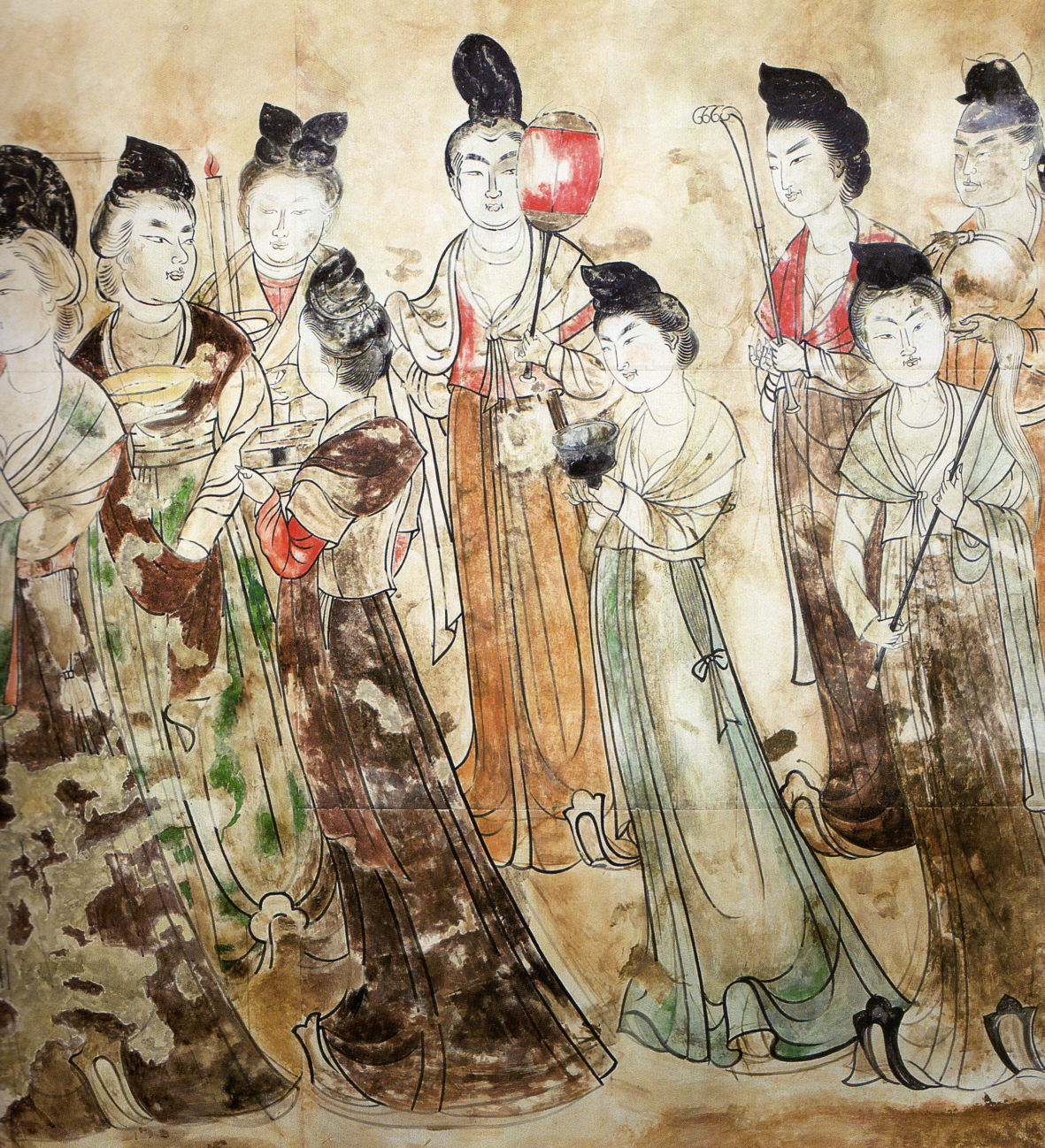
Tang court ladies, 706 AD, Qianling Mausoleum

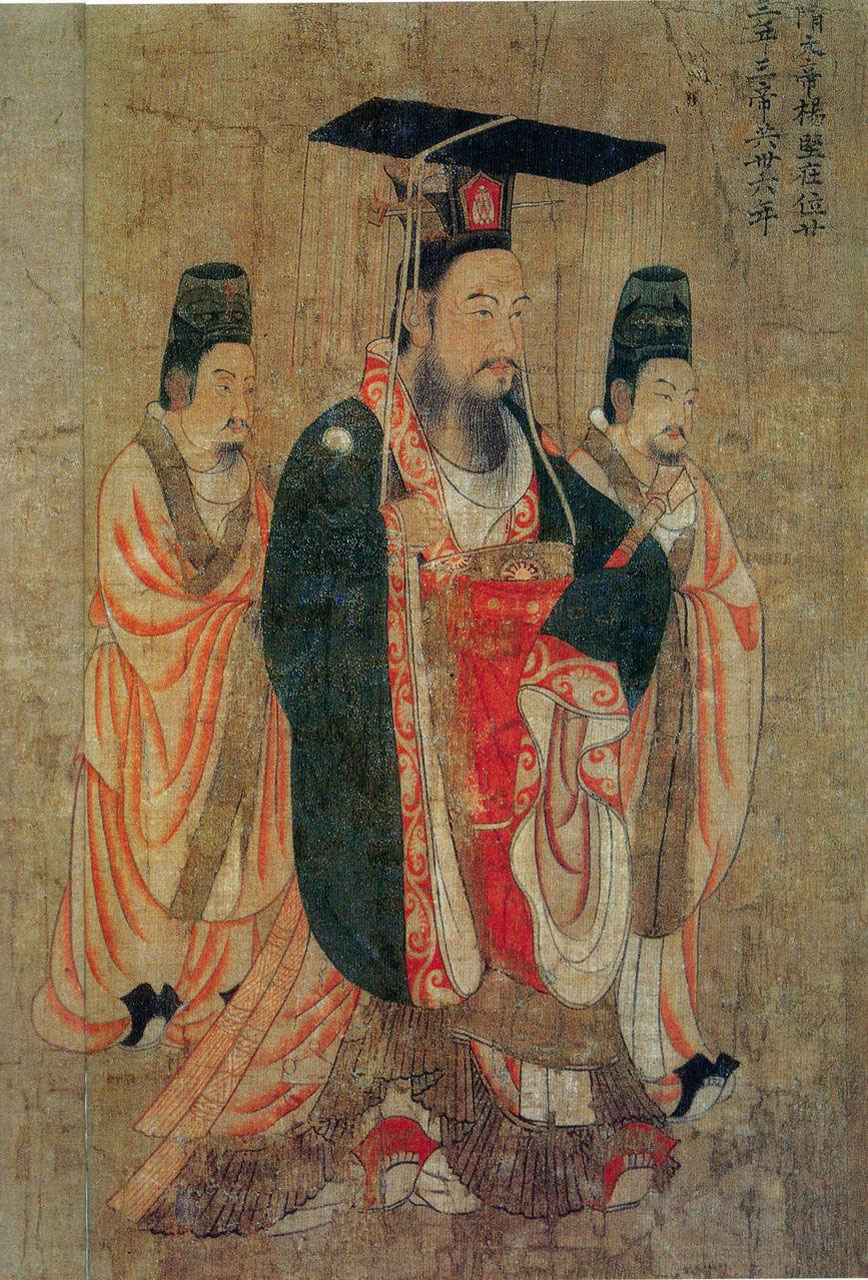
Emperor Wen of Sui, attributed to Yan Liben, 7th century

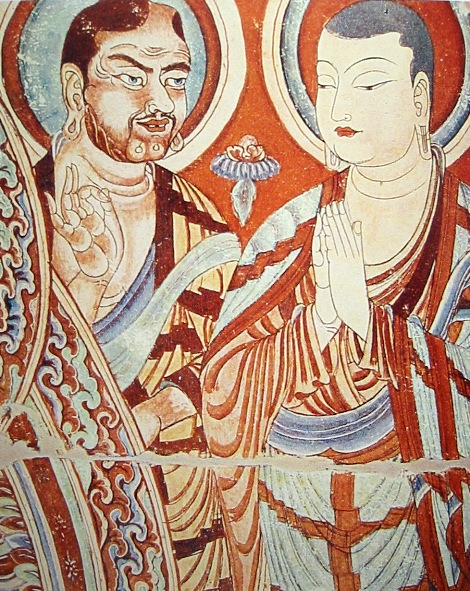
Buddhist mural in the Bezeklik grottoes, 9th century

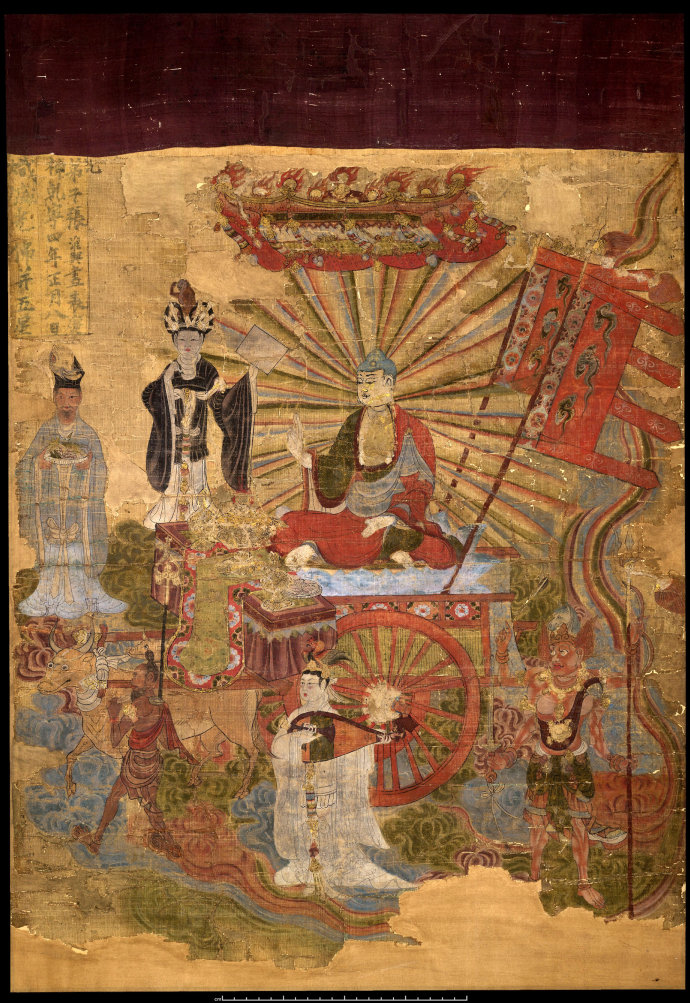
"Tejaprabhā Buddha and the Five Planets", 897, British Museum

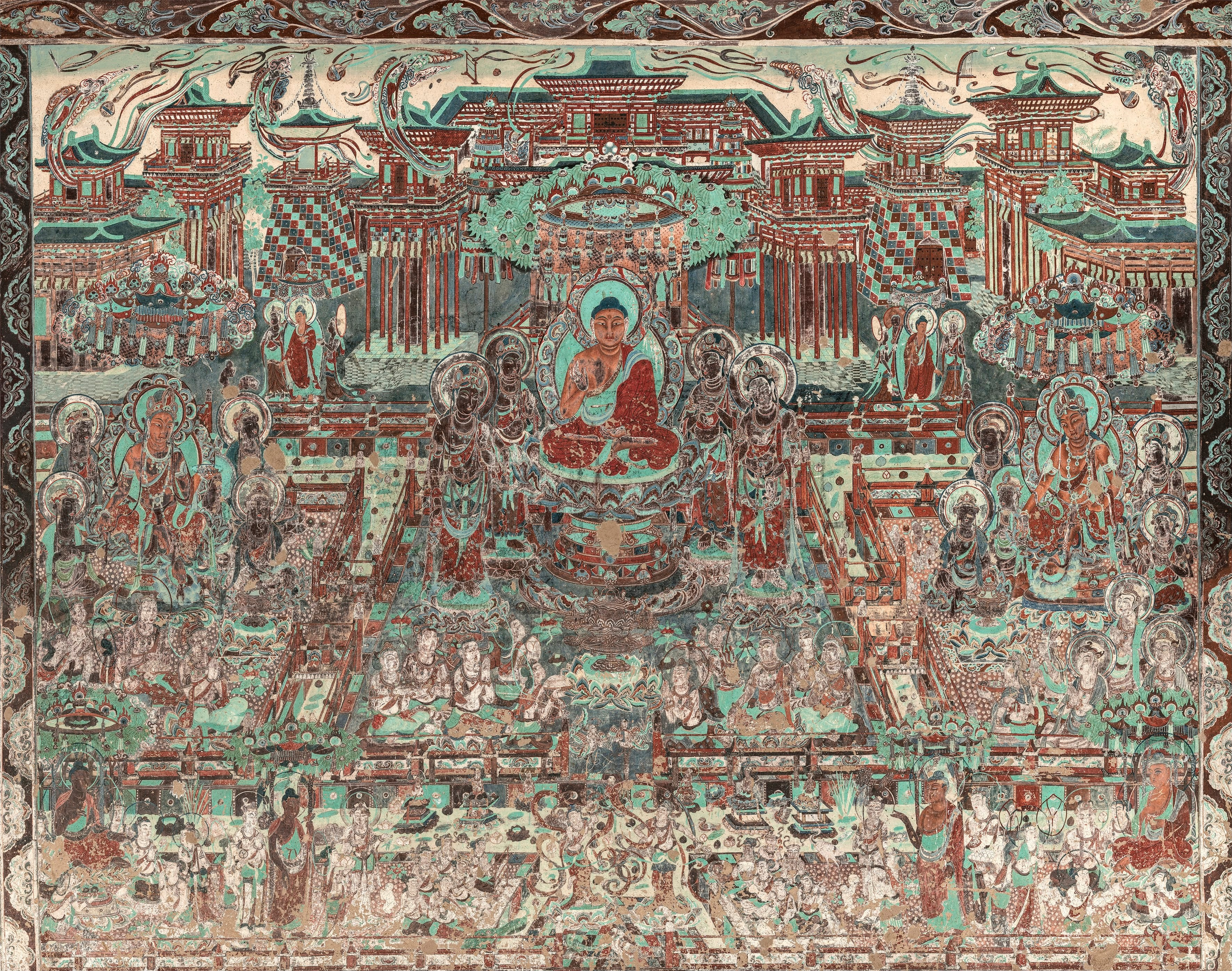
Mural of Buddhist Pure Land from Mogao Caves.

== Pottery ==
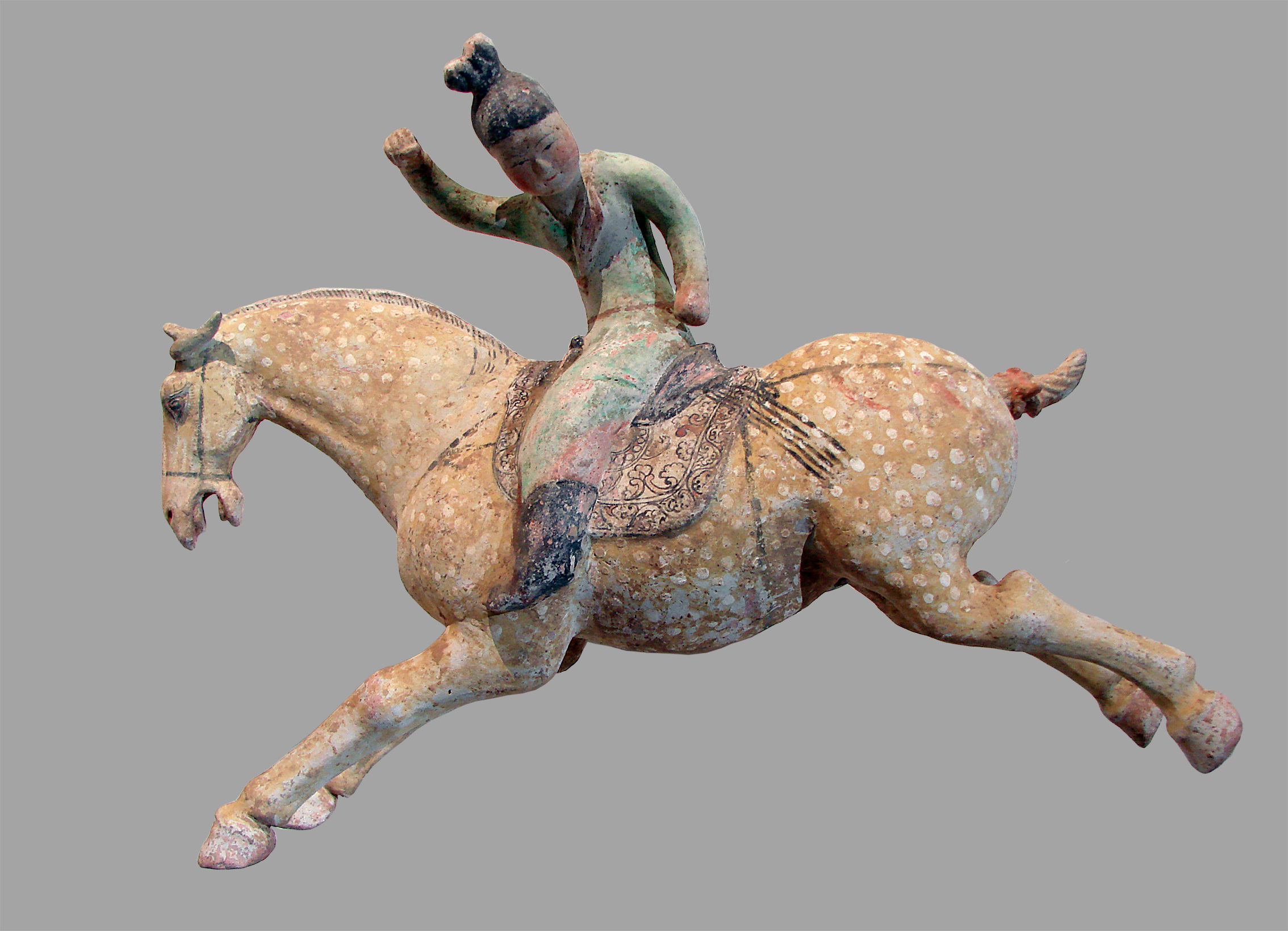
Ceramic tomb figure of a female polo player, before 750.

Chinese ceramics saw many significant developments, including the first Chinese porcelain meeting both Western and Chinese definitions of porcelain, in Ding ware and related types. The earthenware Tang dynasty tomb figures are better known in the West today, but were only made to placed in elite tombs close to the capital in the north, between about 680 and 760. They were perhaps the last significant fine earthenwares to be produced in China. Many are lead-glazed sancai (three-color) wares; others are unpainted or were painted over a slip; the paint has now often fallen off.

Sancai was also used for vessels for burial, and perhaps for use; the glaze was less toxic than in the Han, but perhaps still to be avoided for use at the dining table. The typical shape is the "offering tray", a round or circular and lobed shape with geometrically regular floral-type decoration in the centre.

In the south the wares from the Changsha Tongguan Kiln Site in Tongguan are significant as the first regular use of underglaze painting; examples have been found in many places in the Islamic world. However the production tailed off and underglaze painting remained a minor technique for several centuries.

Yue ware was the leading high-fired, lime-glazed celadon of the period, and was of very sophisticated design, patronized by the court. This was also the case with the northern porcelains of kilns in the provinces of Henan and Hebei, which for the first time met the Western as well as the Eastern definition of porcelain, being a pure white and translucent. One of the first mentions of porcelain by a foreigner was by the Arab traveler and merchant Sulaiman al-Tajir in 851 AD during the Tang dynasty who recorded that:

They have in China a very fine clay with which they make vases which are as transparent as glass; water is seen through them. The vases are made of clay.

Yaozhou ware or Northern Celadon also began under the Tang, though like Ding ware its best period was under the next Song dynasty.

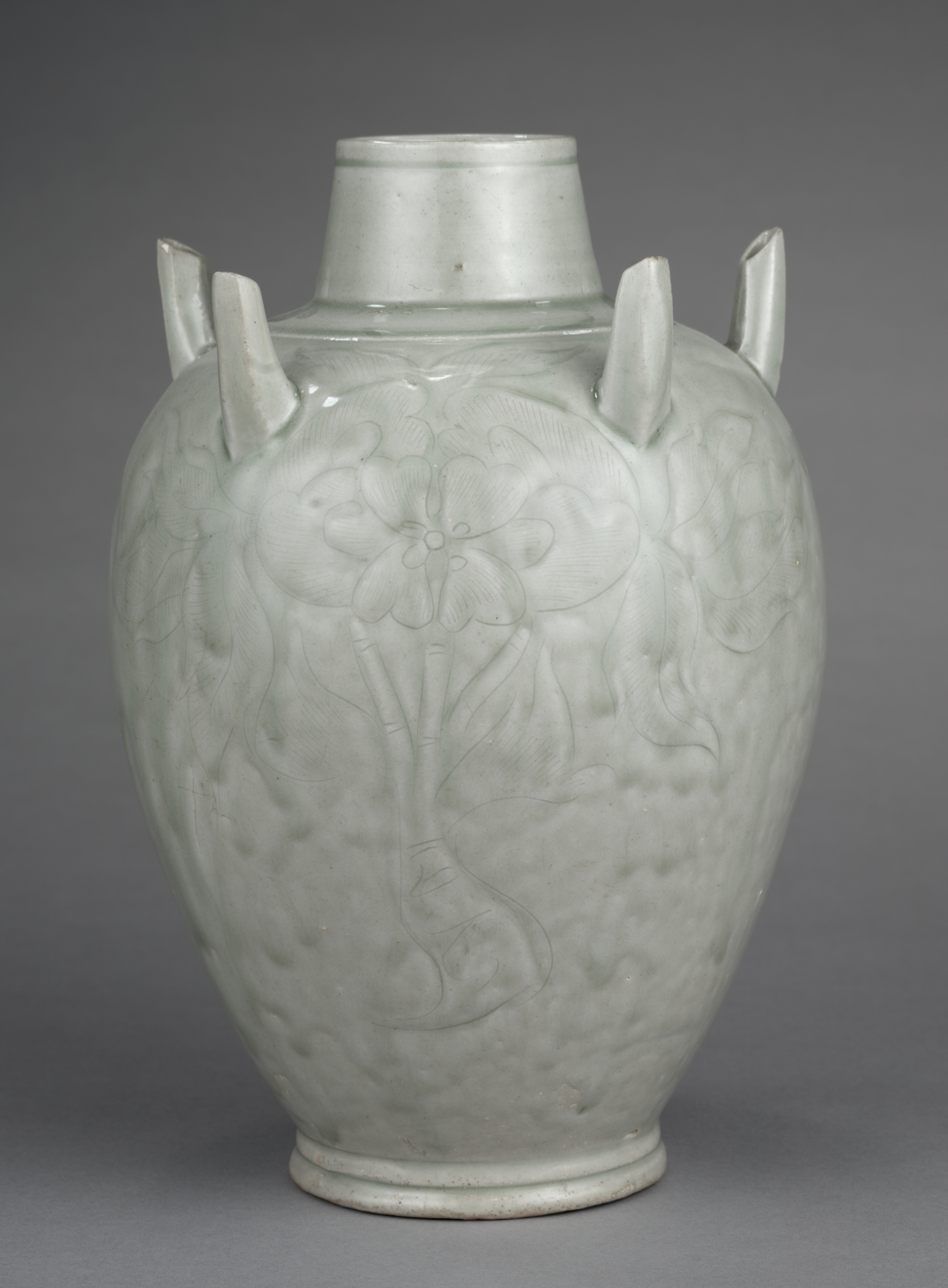
Yue ware vase with incised decoration, c. 900, "green-glazed porcelaneous stoneware"

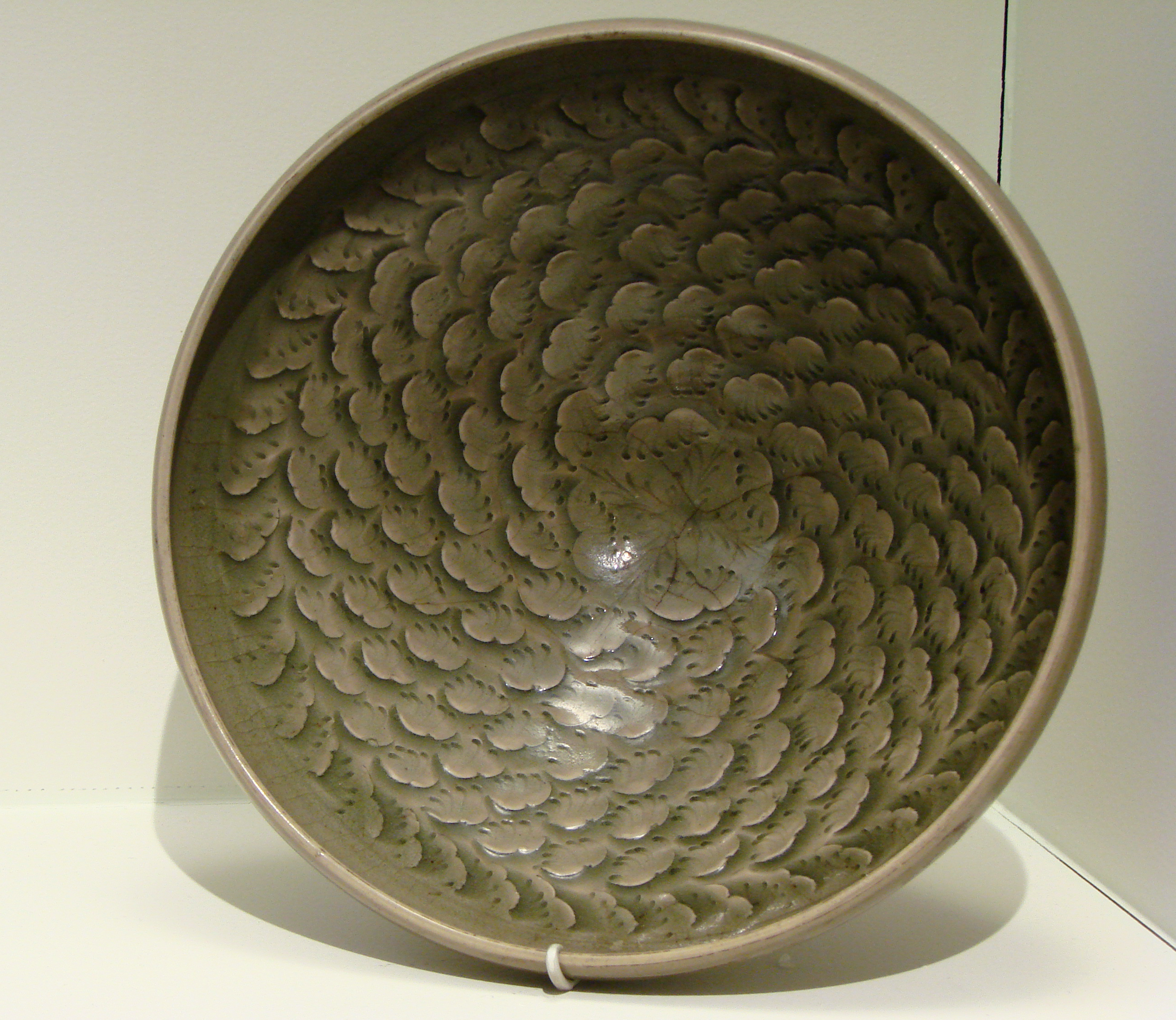
Yaozhou ware or Northern Celadon dish, 8th century

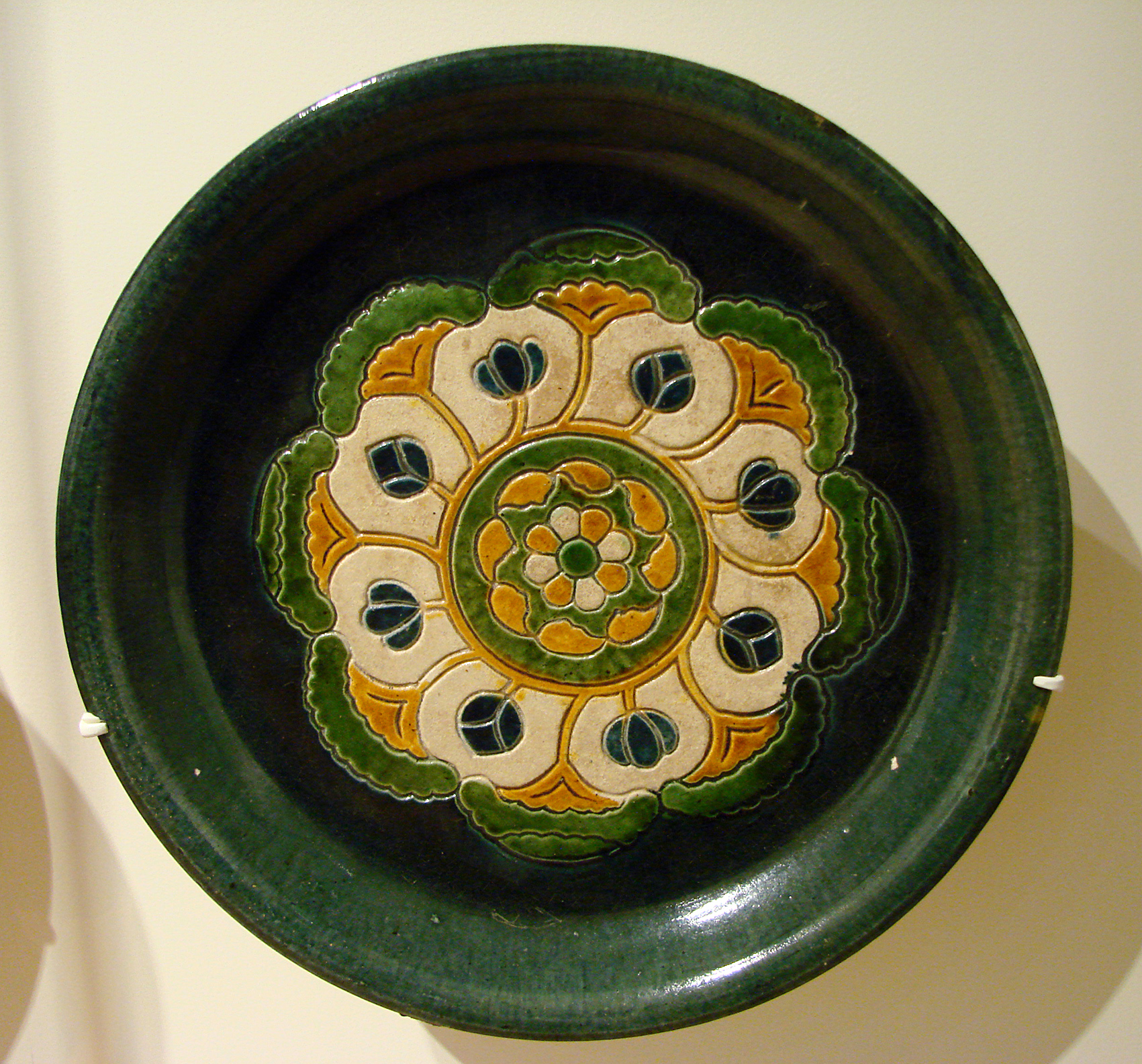
"Offering plate" with sancai glaze, 8th century.

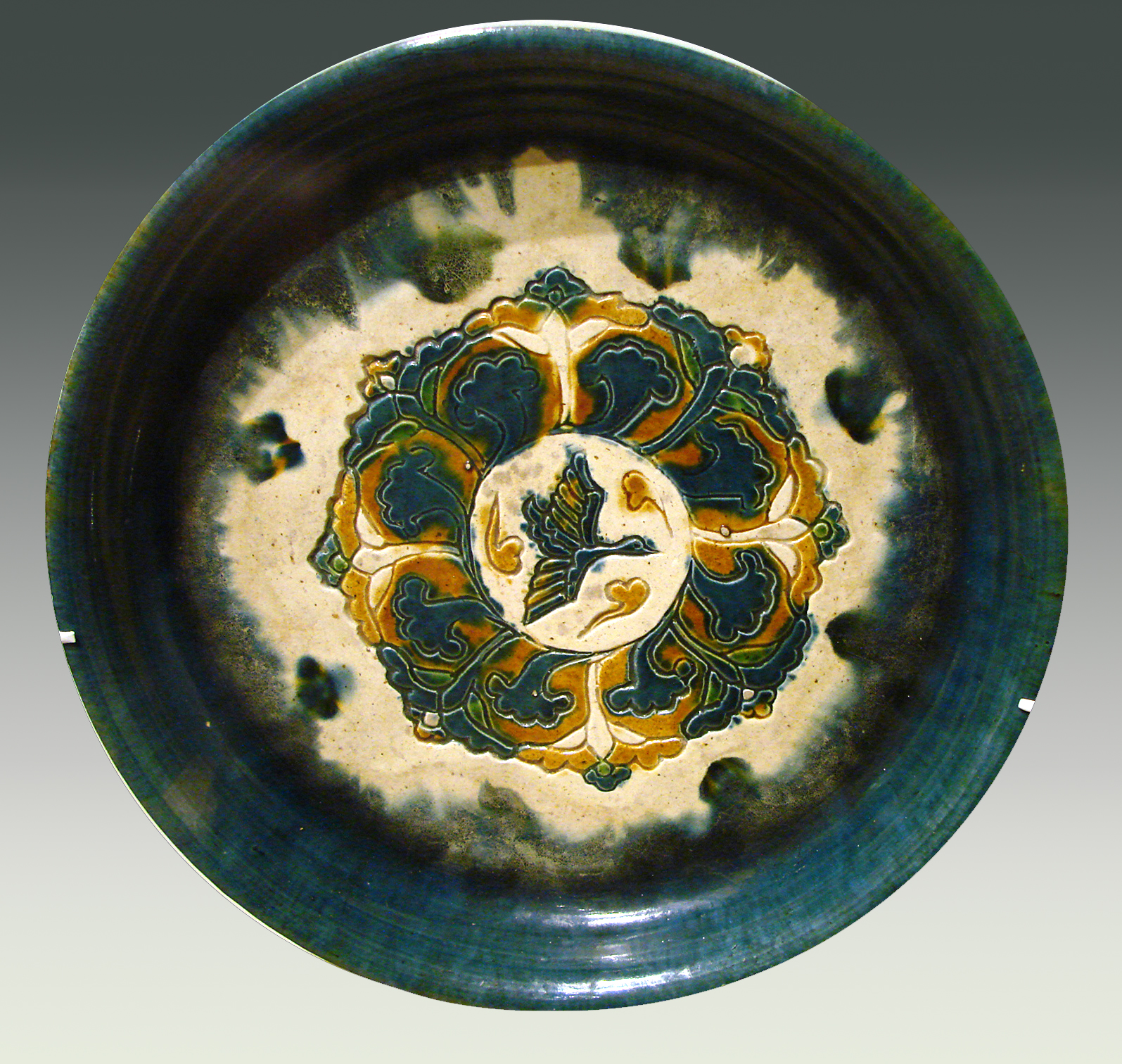
"Offering plate" with sancai glaze, decorated with a bird and trees, 8th century.

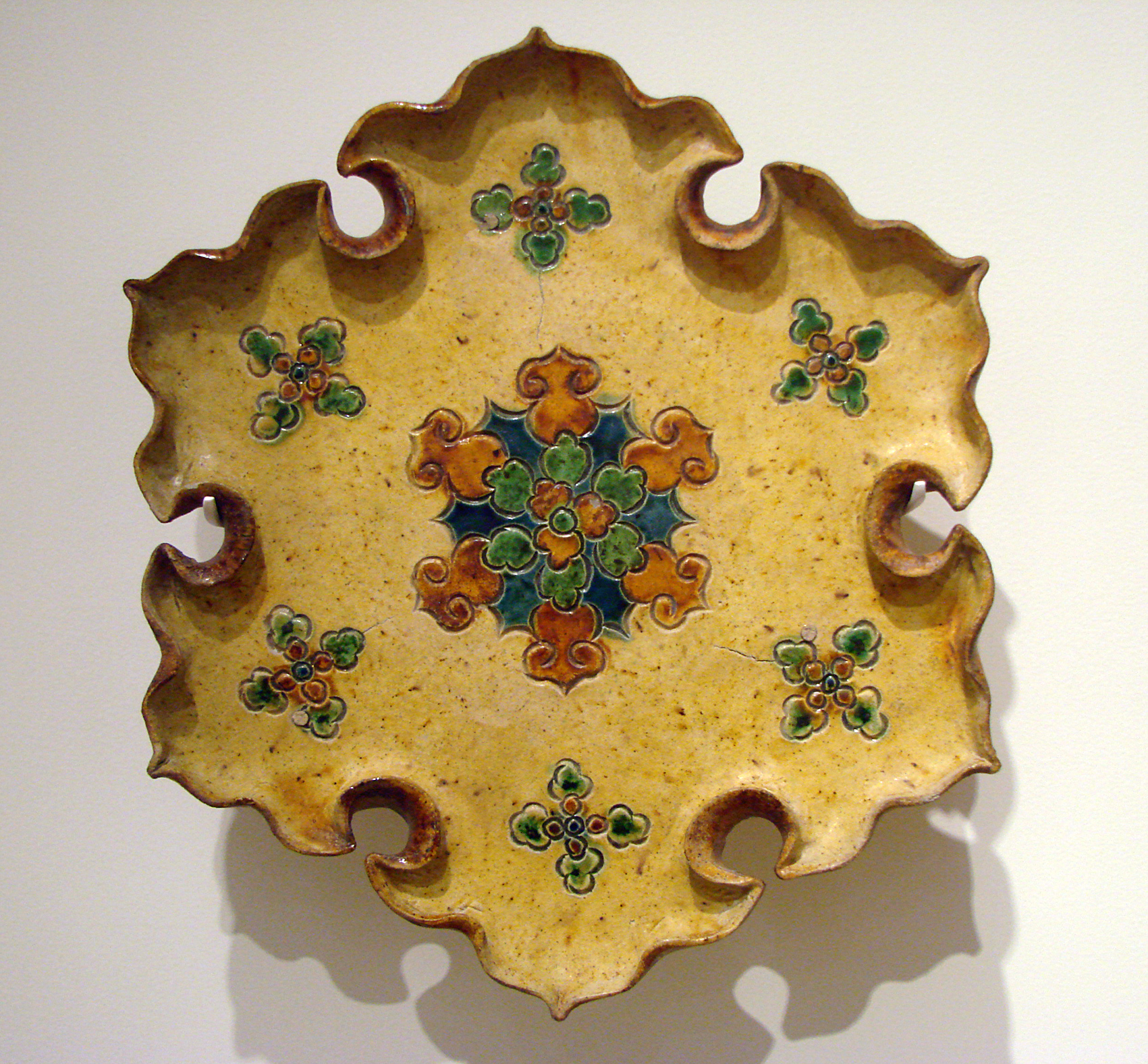
"Offering plate" with sancai with six eaves and "three colors" glaze, 8th century.

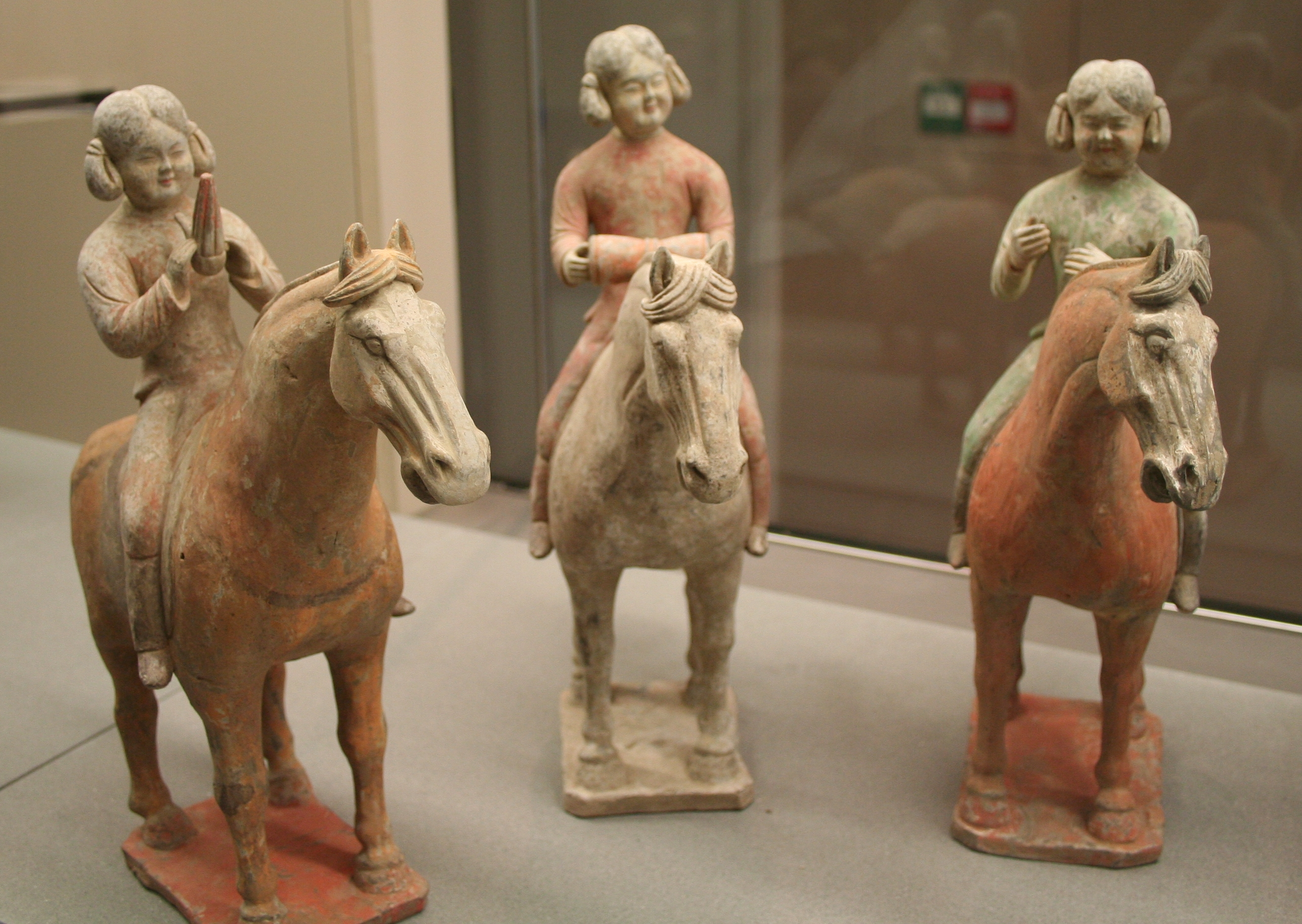
Tomb figures: three of eight lady musicians on horseback, early 8th century

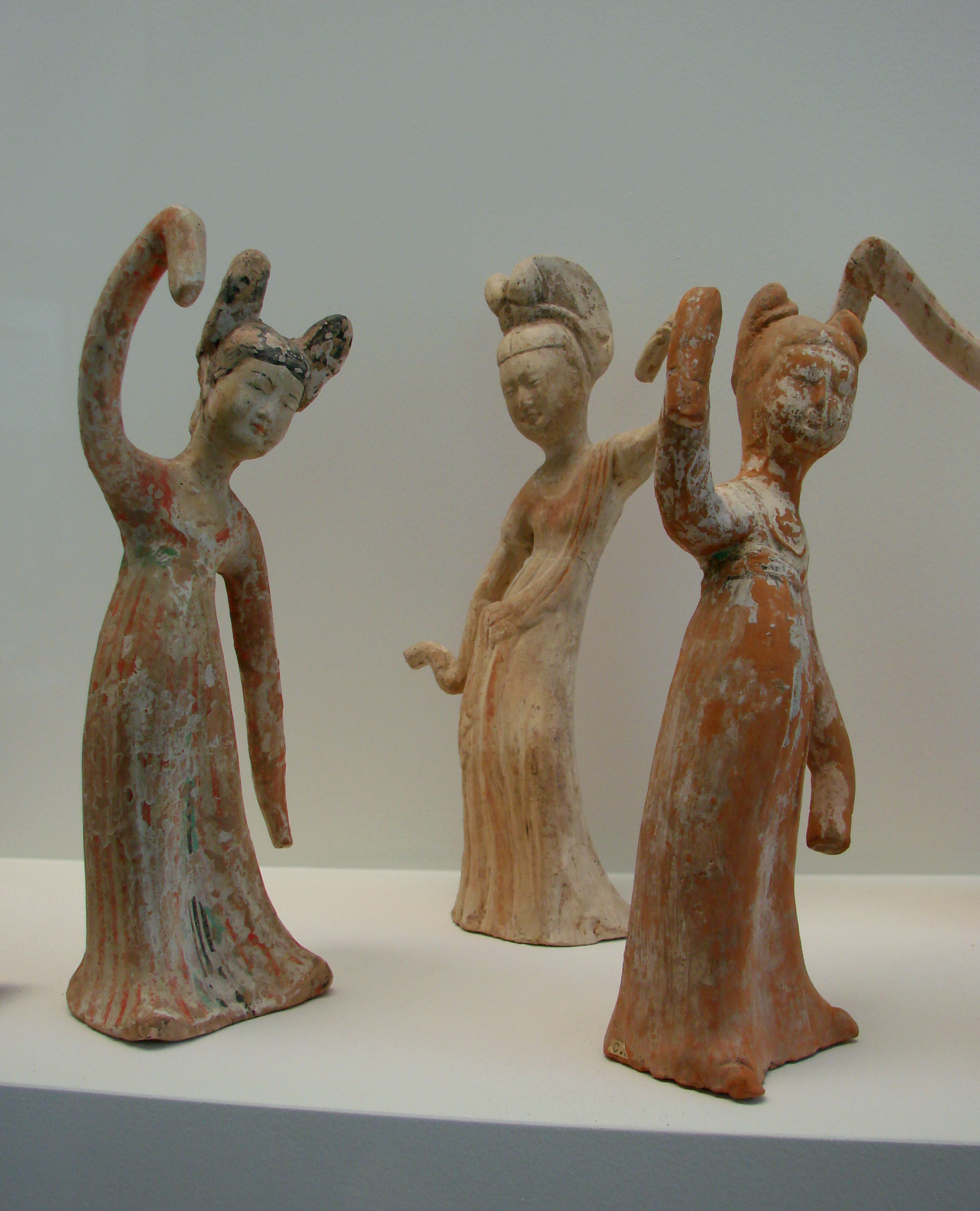
Ladies dancing, 7th century

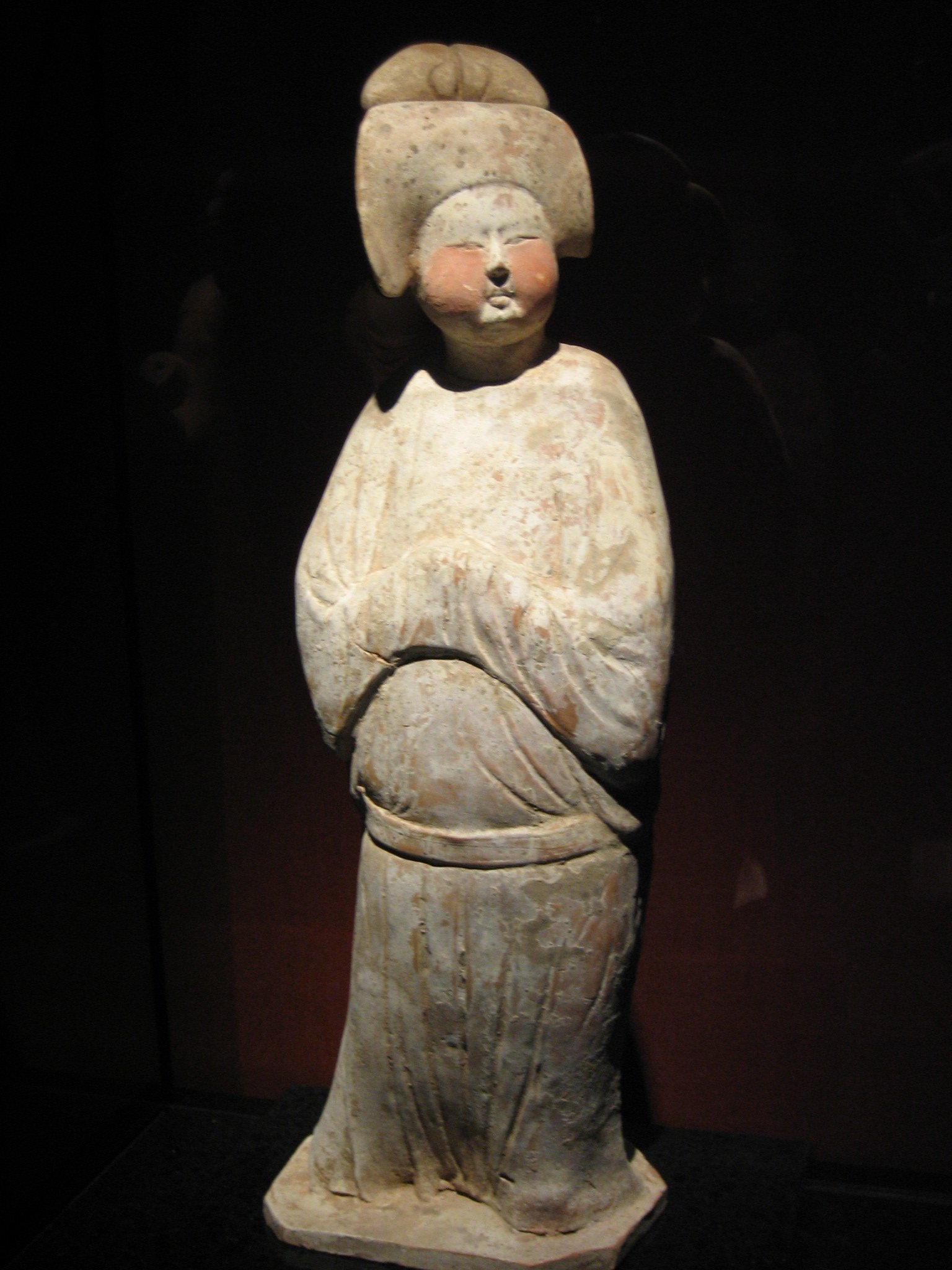
Tomb figure of a plump Tang woman

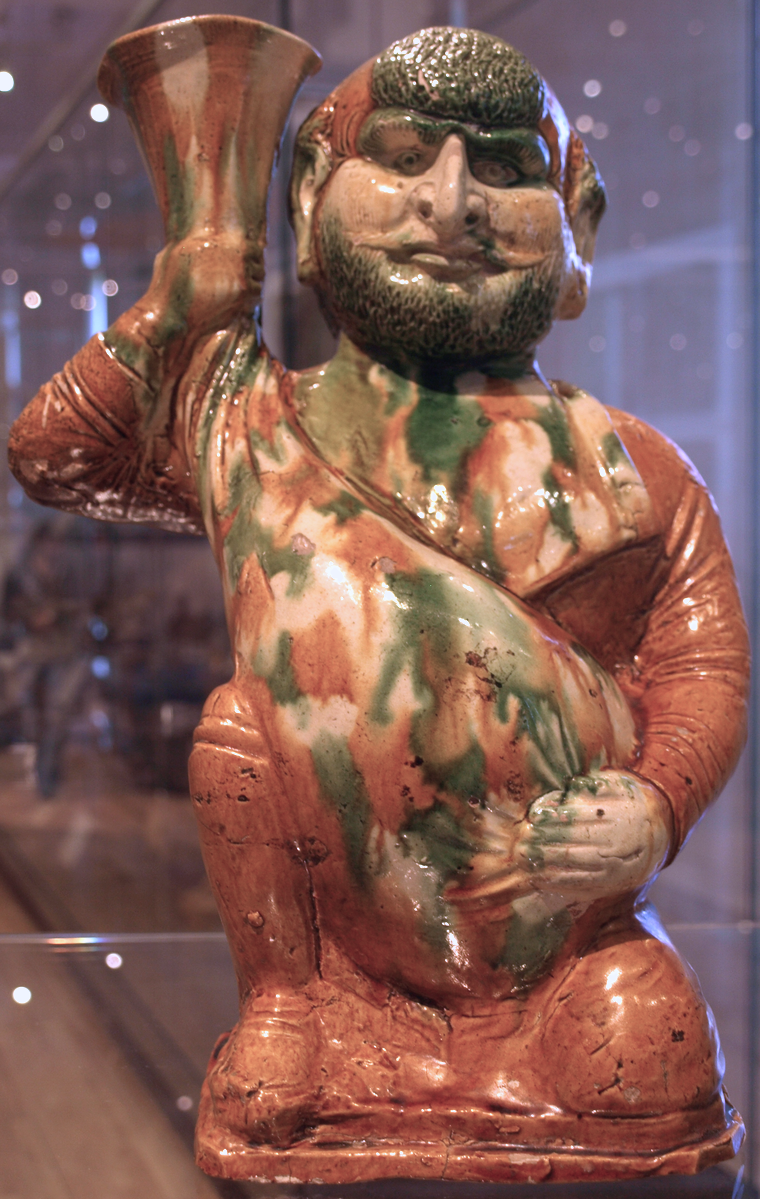
Tomb figure of a foreigner with a wineskin, c. 674–750

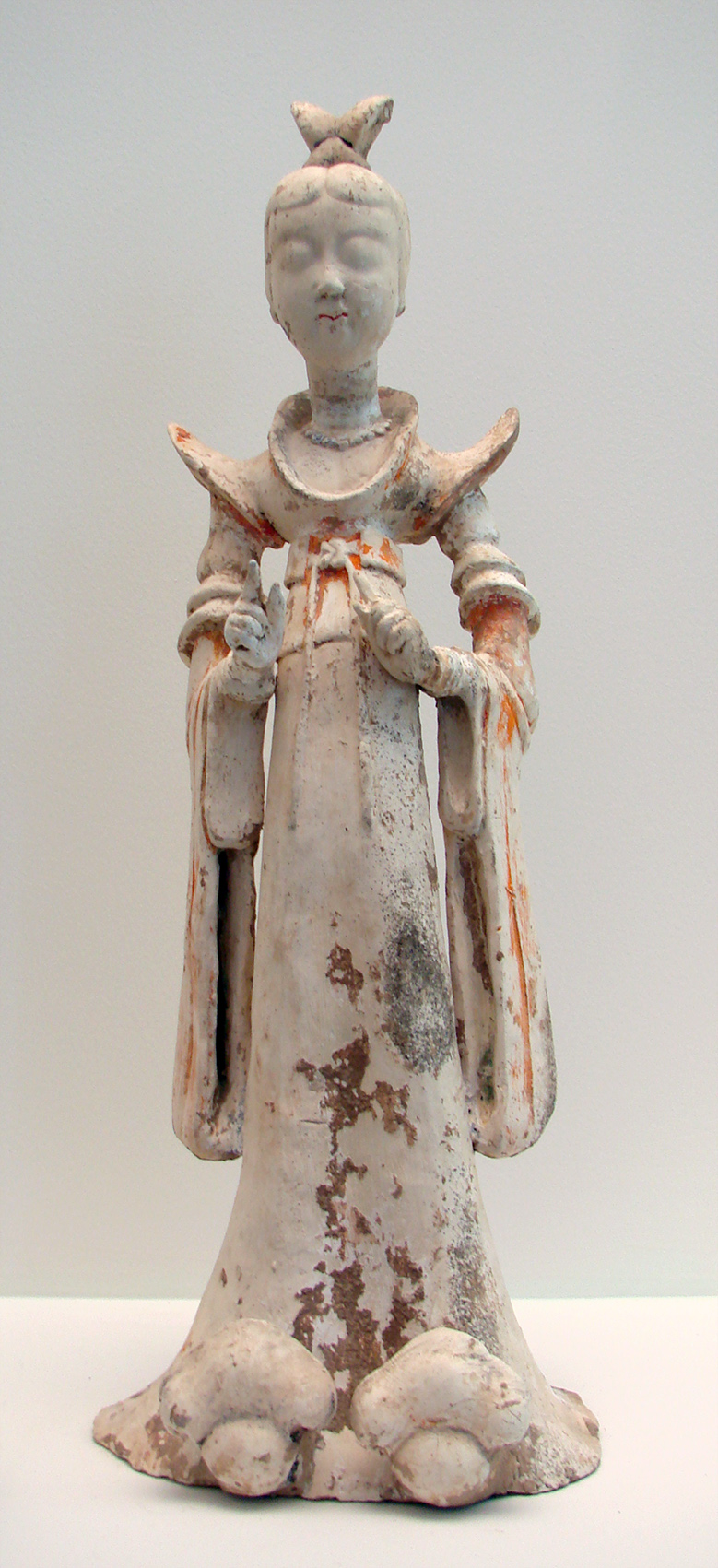
Tomb figure, 7th-8th century

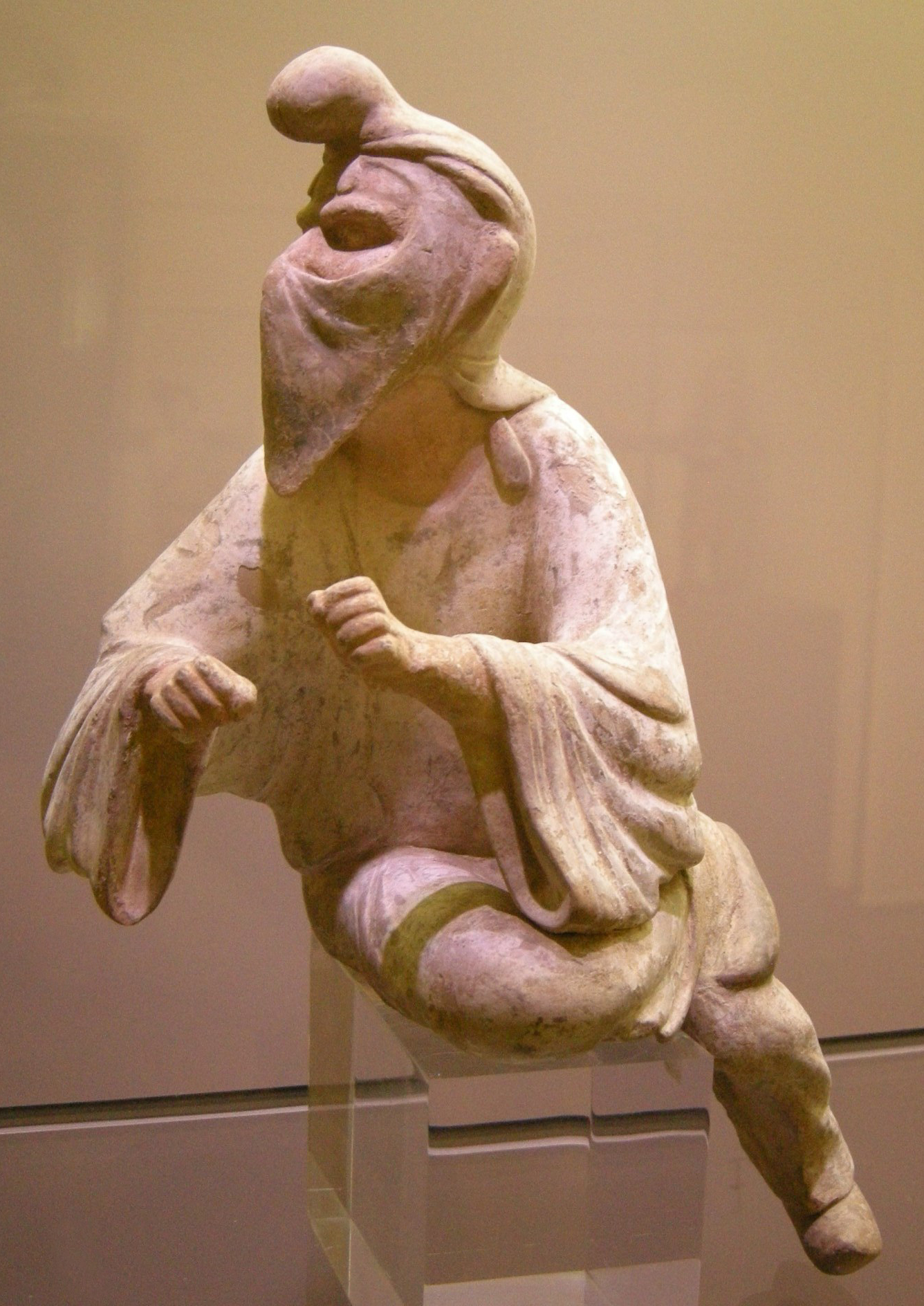
Tomb figure of a Sogdian man wearing a distinctive cap and face veil, possibly a camel rider or even a Zoroastrian priest engaging in a ritual at a fire temple, 8th century AD

== Sculpture ==
Fengxian Temple at the Longmen Grottoes, built between 672 and 676 for Empress Wu Zetian

Most sculpture before the official rejection of Buddhism in 845 was religious, and a vast amount was destroyed during the Tang period itself, with most of the rest lost in later periods. There were many bronze and wooden sculptures, whose style is best seen in the survivals in Japanese temples. Monumental sculpture in stone, and also terracotta, has survived at several complexes of rock-cut temples, of which the largest and most famous are the Longmen Grottoes and the Mogao Caves (at Dunhuang), both of which were at their peak of expansion during the Tang. The best combined "the Indian feeling for solid, swelling form and the Chinese genius for expression in terms of linear rhythm ... to produce a style which was to become the basis of all later Buddhist sculpture in China."

The tomb-figures are discussed above; though probably not treated very seriously as art by their producers, and sometimes rather sloppily made, and especially painted, they remain vigorous and effective as sculpture, especially when animals and foreigners are depicted, the latter with an element of caricature. A rather different class and type of tomb sculpture is seen in the reliefs of the six favourite horses at the mausoleum of Emperor Taizong (d. 649). By tradition these were designed by the court painter Yan Liben, and the relief is so flat and linear that it seems likely they were carved after drawings or paintings.

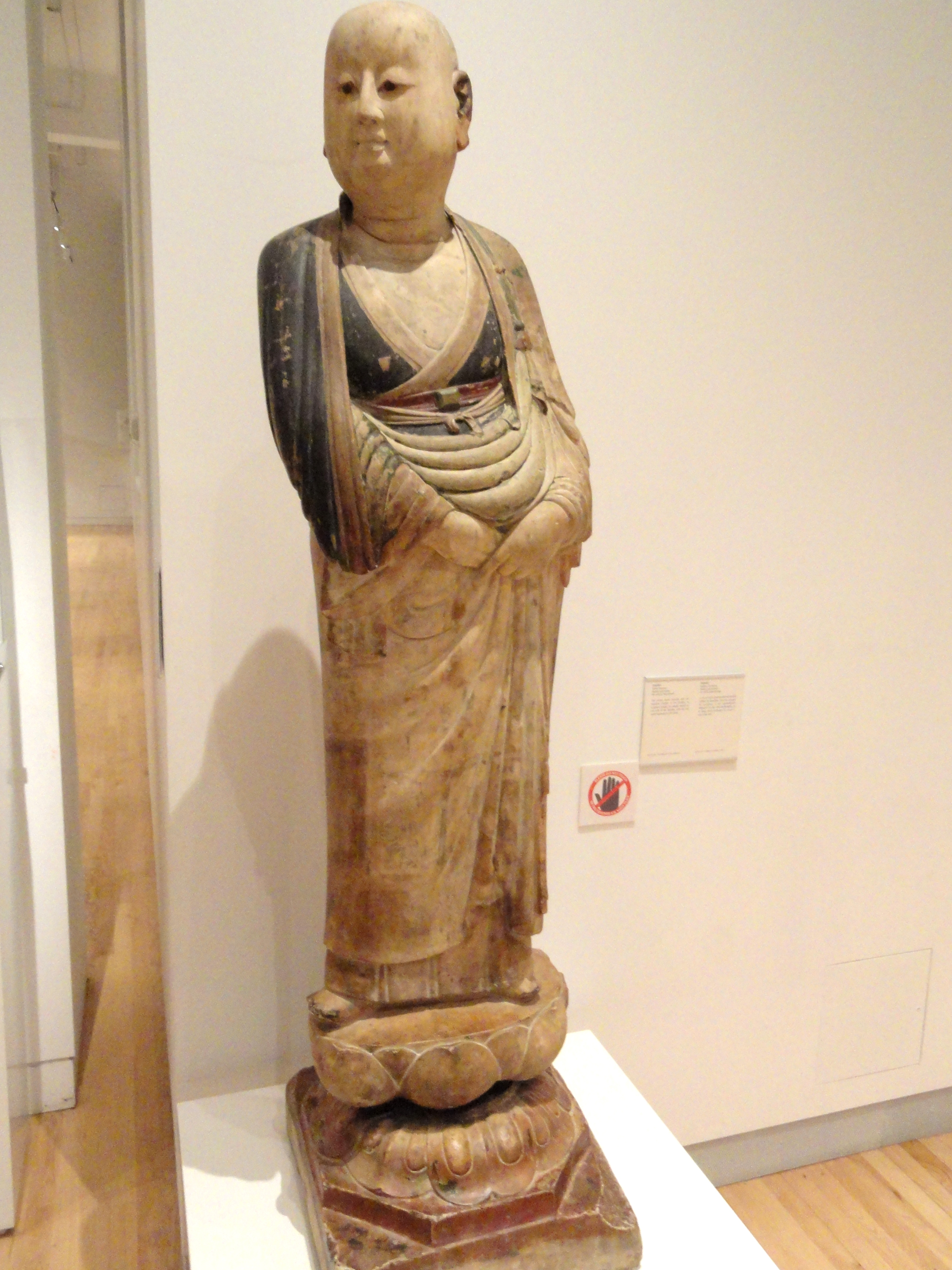
Marble Ananda, from Shanxi Province, one of a pair now in Canada

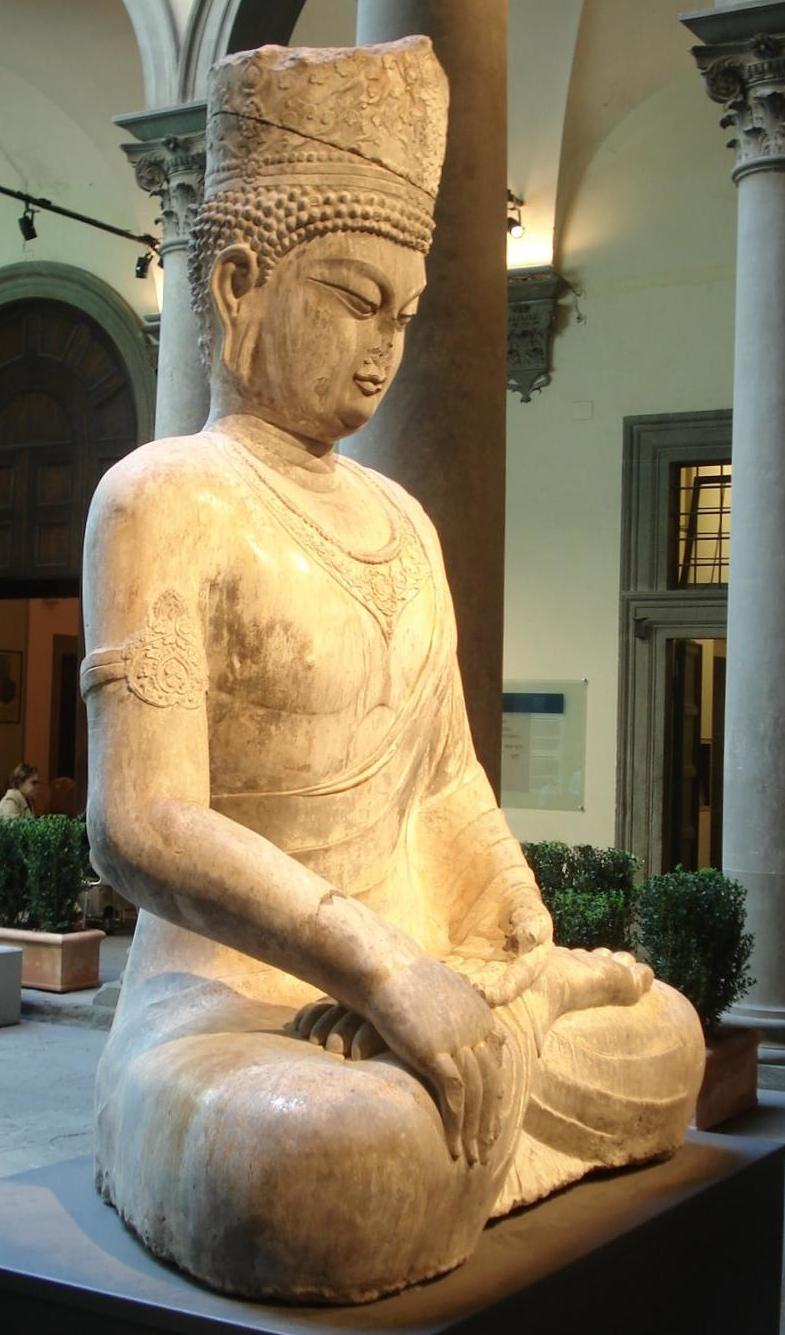
Maitreya, 2.4 metres high, from Longmen Grottoes, Wu Zetian reign

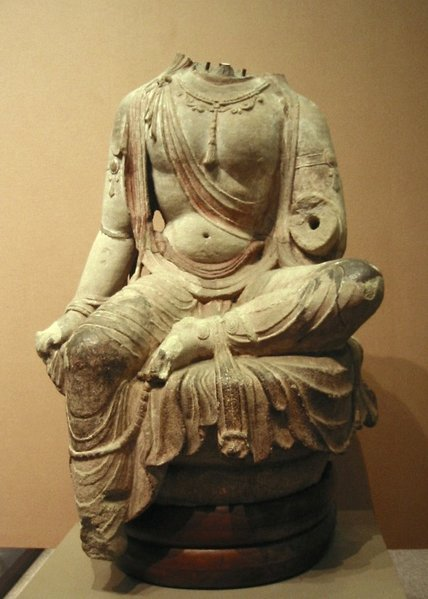
Tang dynasty bodhisattva statue missing its head and left arm

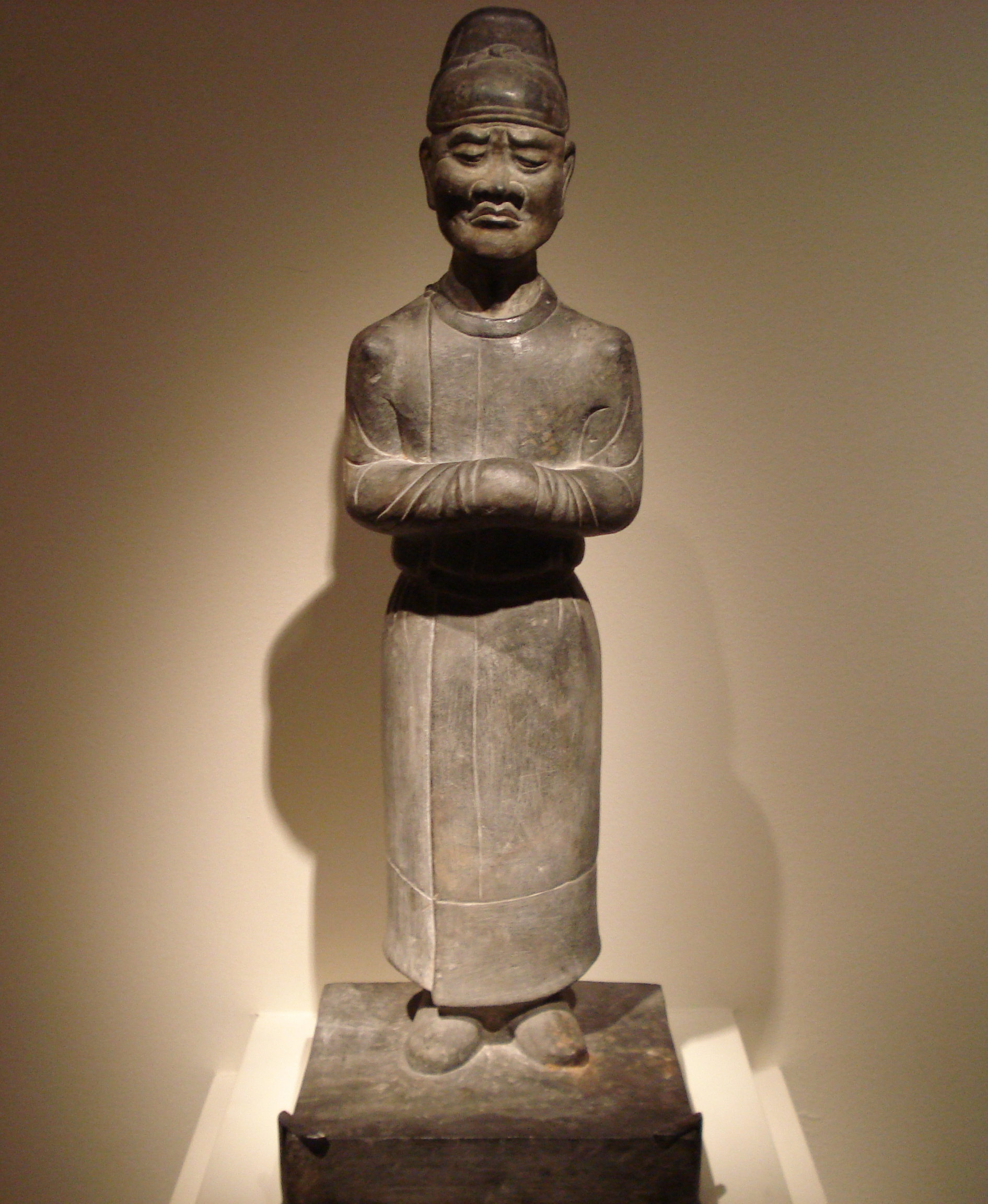
A limestone statue of a mourning attendant, 7th century

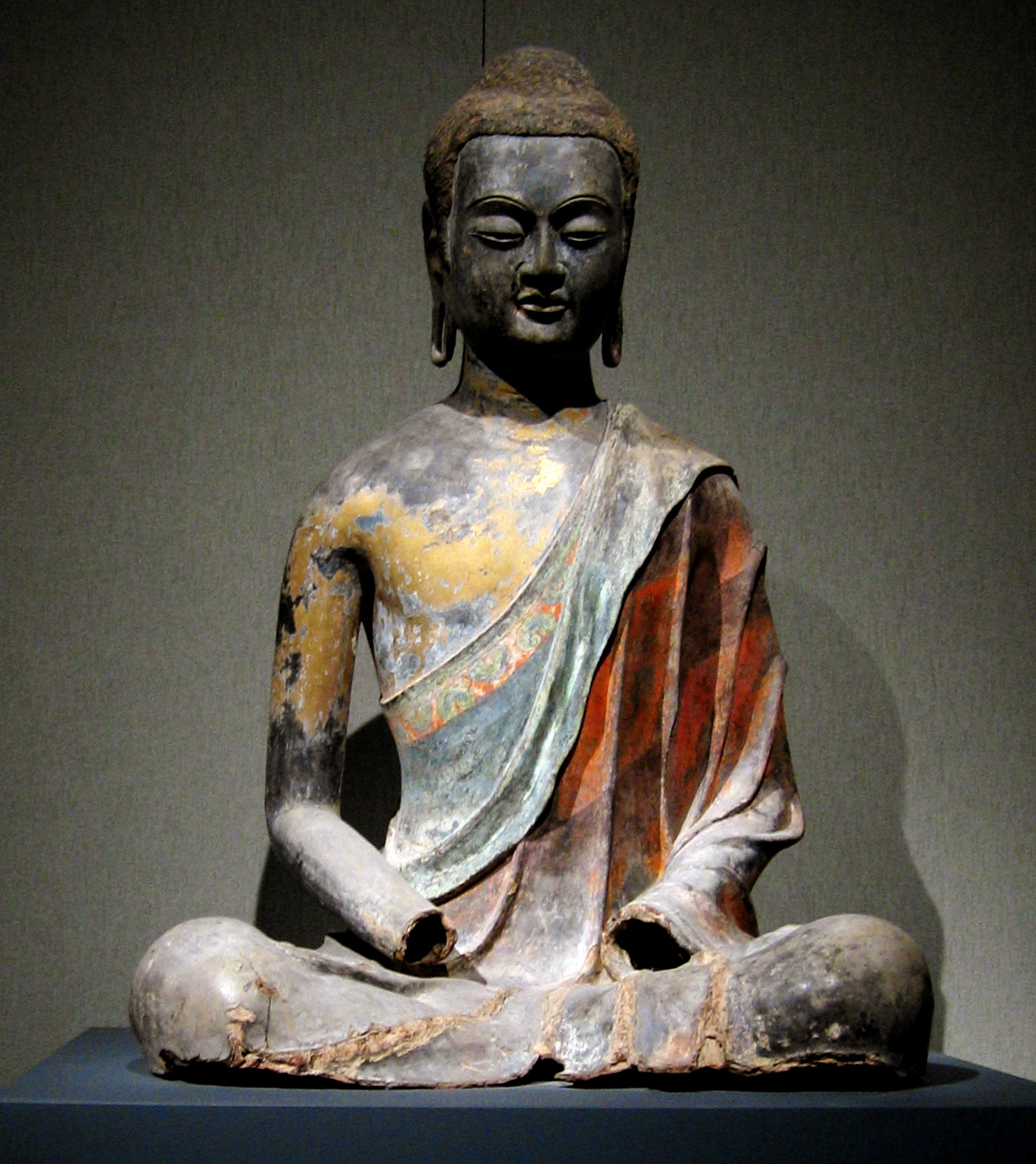
Seated Buddha statue in dry lacquer technique.

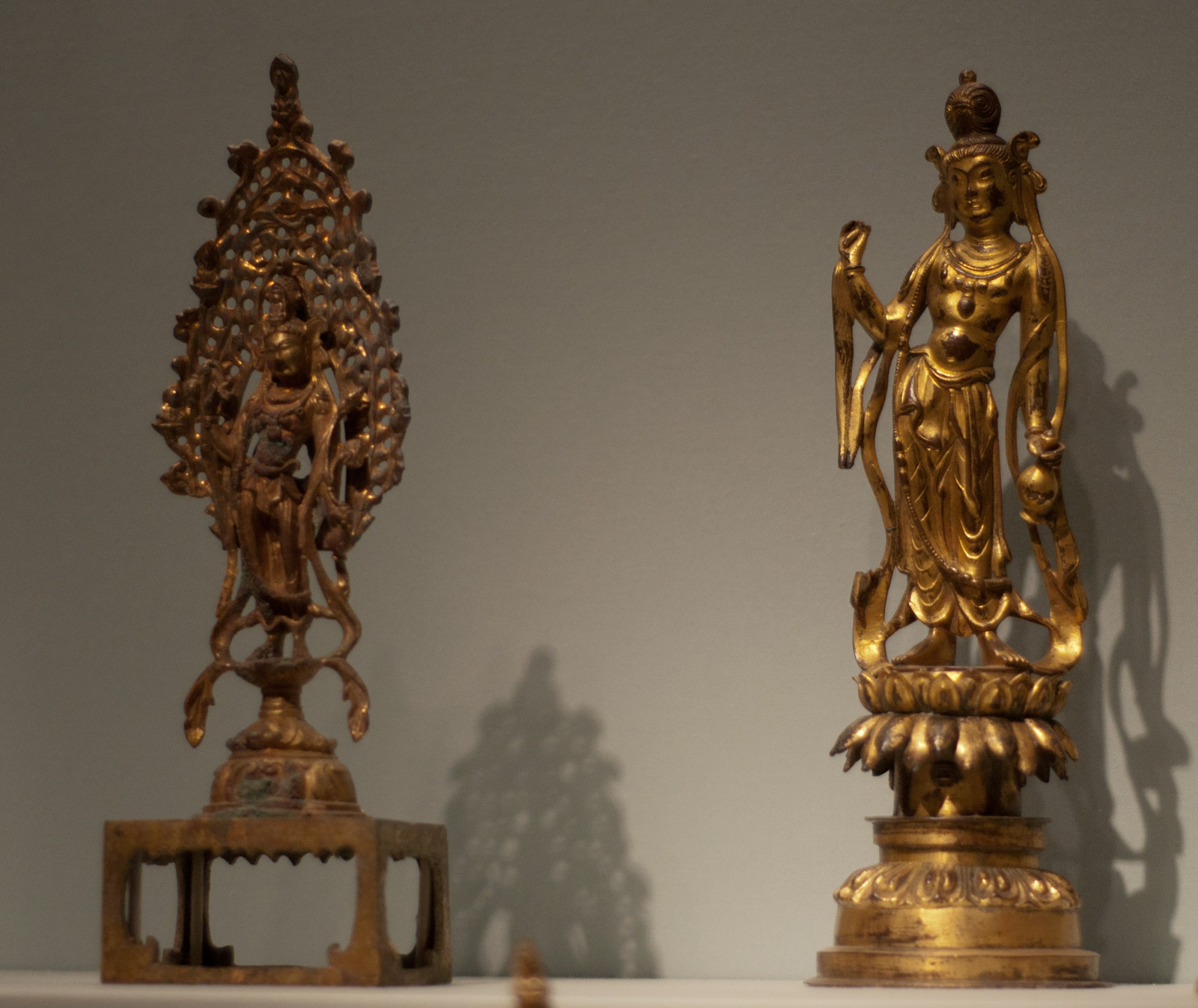
Two Guanyin statues in gilt-bronze; only small bronze statues like this have survived.

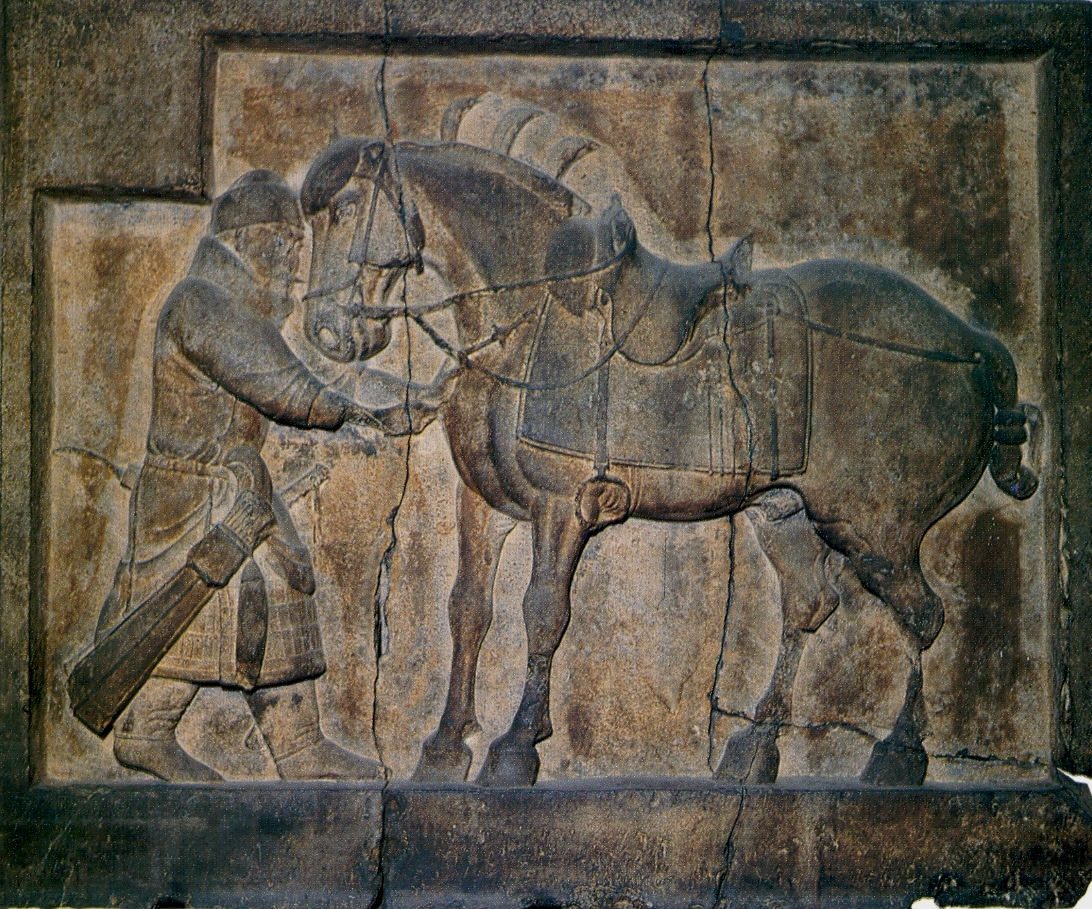
One of the reliefs of the six favourite horses of Emperor Taizong (d. 649), very likely after a drawing by Yan Liben

== Metalwork and decorative arts ==
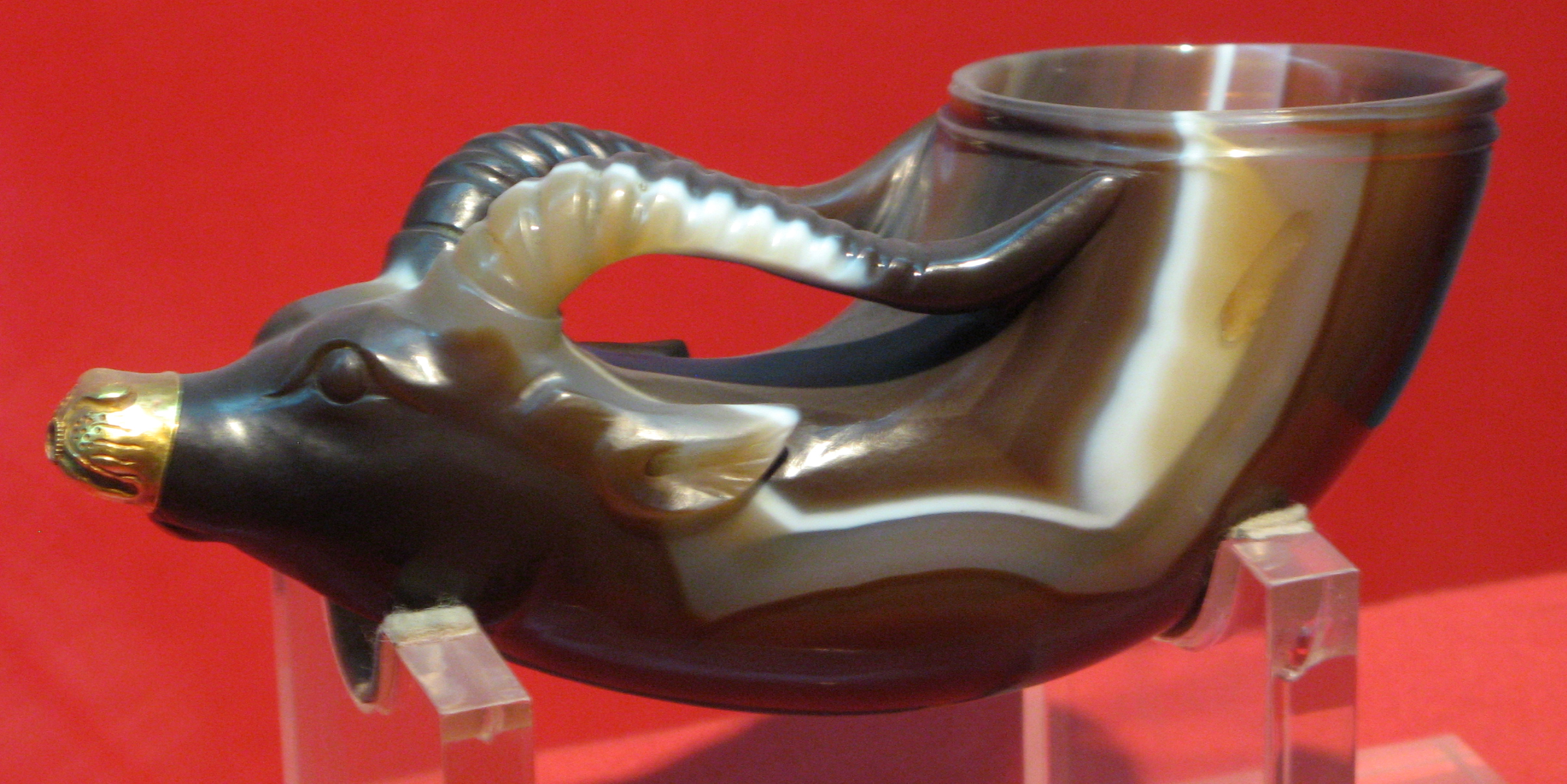
Carved agate drinking horn (Rhyton), from the Hejia Village hoard

Tang elite metalwork, surviving mostly in bronze or silver cups and mirrors, is often of superb quality, decorated using a variety of techniques, and often inlaid with gold and other metals. An exceptionally fine deposit is the collection in the Tōdai-ji in Nara in Japan of the personal goods of Emperor Shōmu, given to the Buddhist shrine by his daughter Empress Kōmyō after her father's death in 756. As well as metalwork, paintings and calligraphy, this includes furniture, glass, lacquer and wood pieces such as musical instruments and board games. Most is probably made in China, though some is Japanese and some from the Middle East.

Another important deposit was discovered in 1970 at Xi'an when the Hejia Village hoard was uncovered by construction. Placed into two large ceramic pots, 64 cm high, and a silver one, 25 cm high, this was a large collection of over a thousand objects, altogether representing a rather puzzling collection. Several of them were gold or silver vessels and other objects of the highest quality, as well as hardstone carvings in jade and agate, and gemstones. It was probably hidden in a hurry during the An Lushan revolt, in which the Tang capital was taken more than once. Many of the objects are imported, mostly from along the Silk Road, especially Sogdia, and others show Sogdian influence. Two objects from the hoard (illustrated) are included on the very select official list of Chinese cultural relics forbidden to be exhibited abroad. The hoard is now in the Shaanxi History Museum.

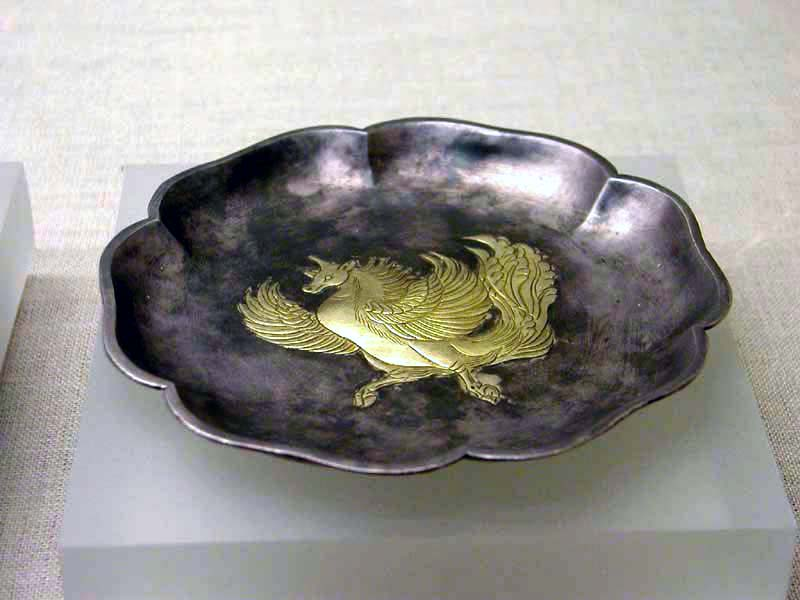
Gilt hexagonal silver plate with a Fei Lian beast pattern

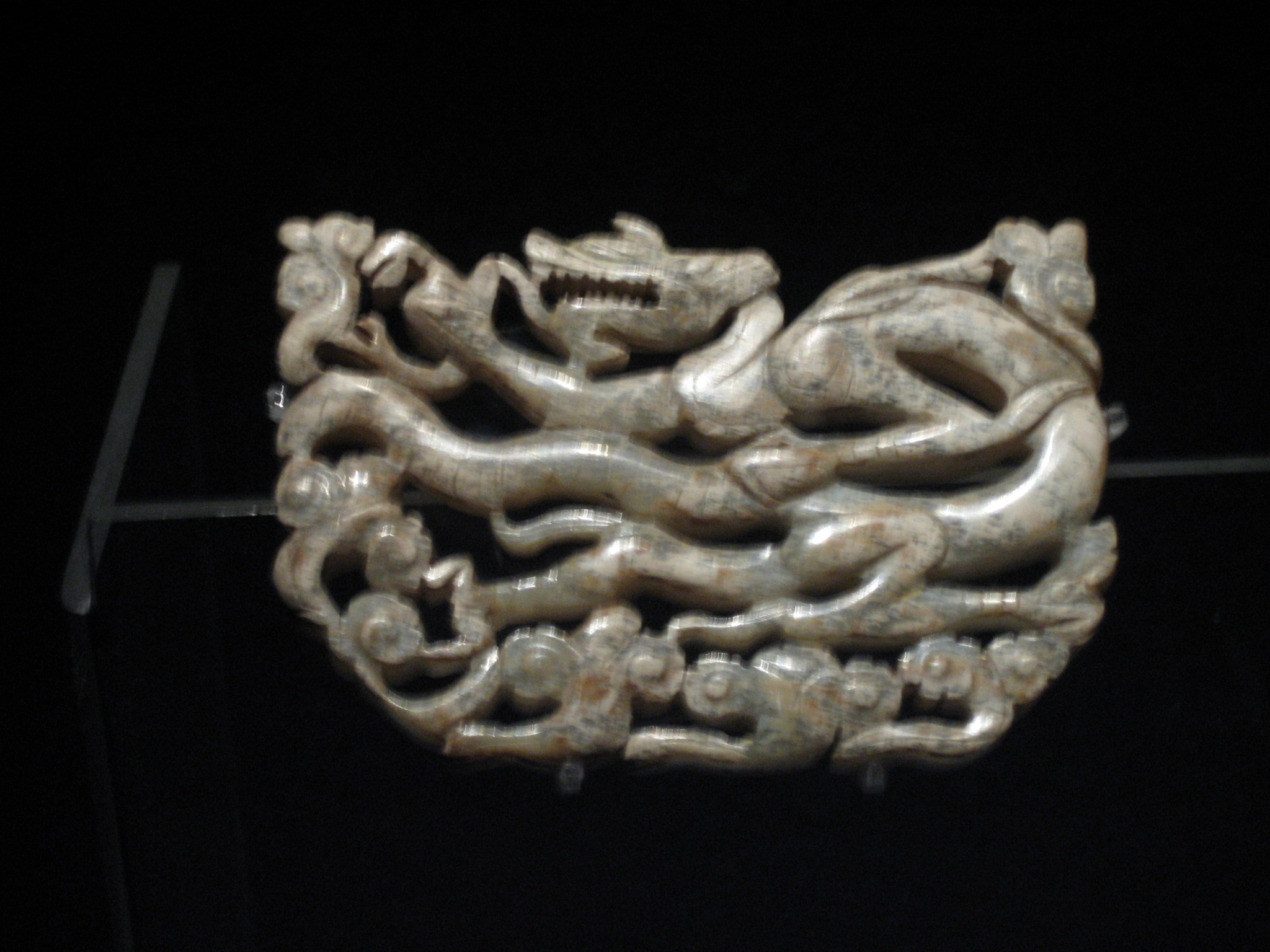
Jade-carved dragon, Tang dynasty, Shanghai Museum

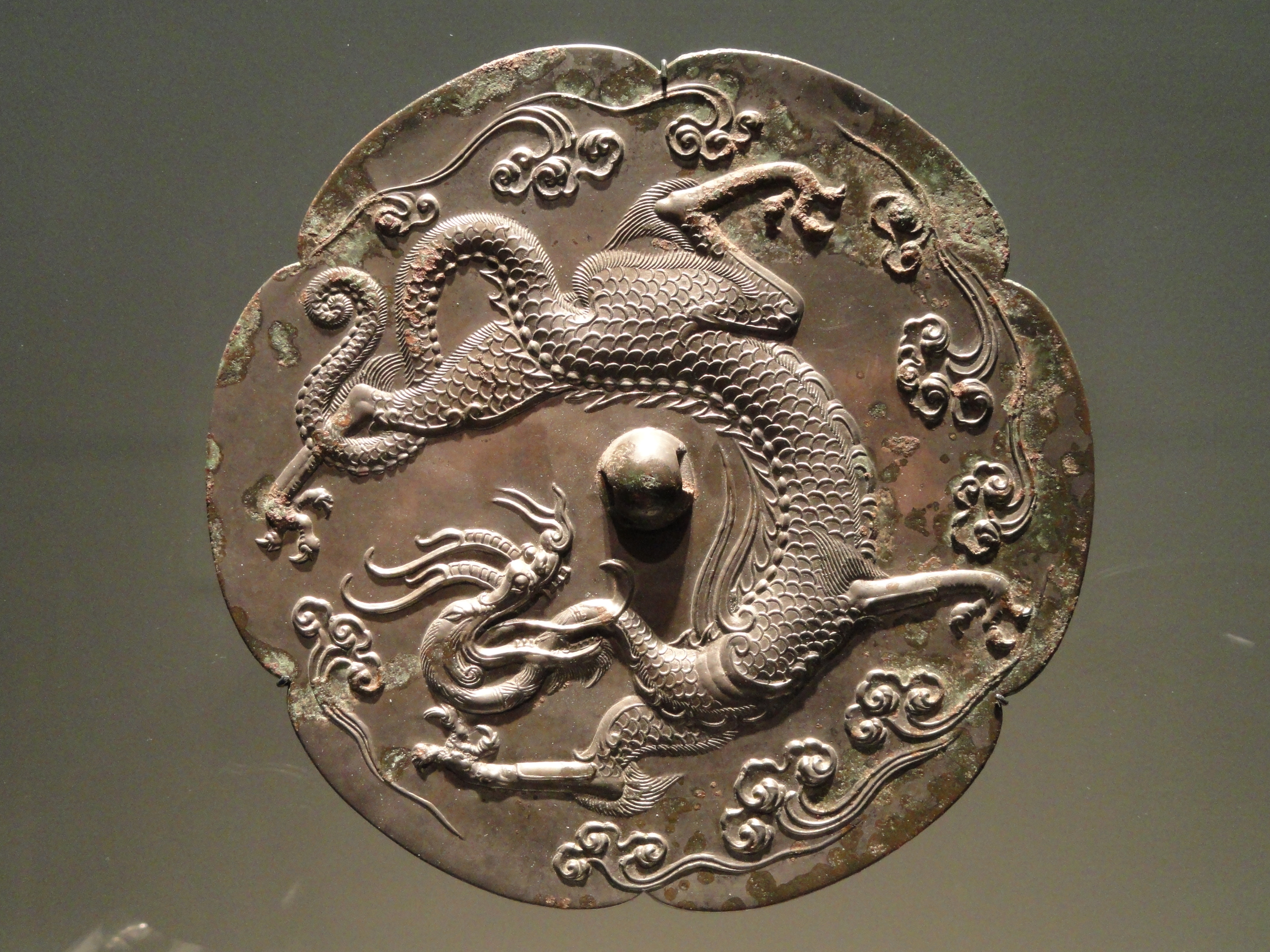
Mirror back with dragon

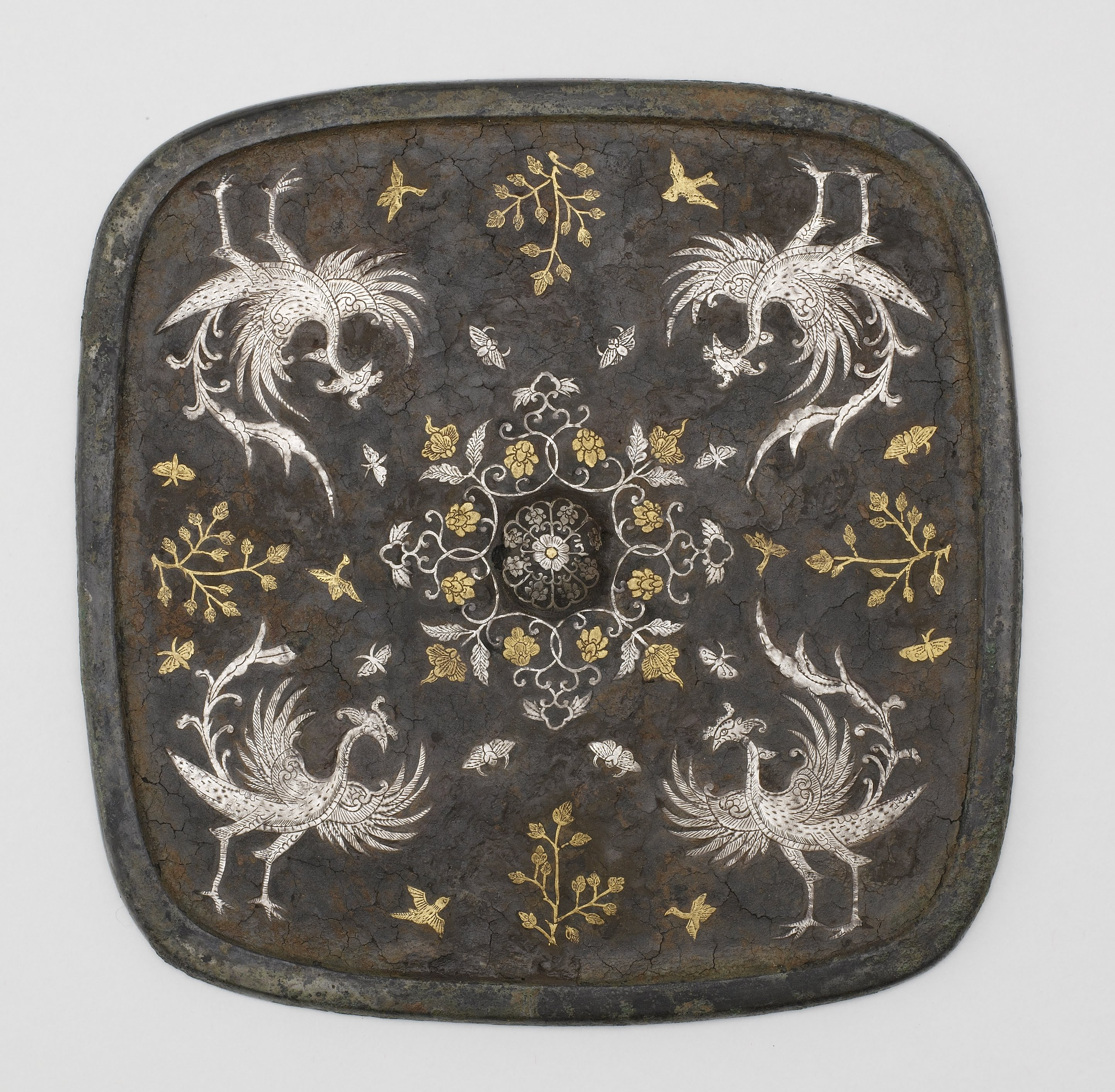
Mirror with floral medallion, plant sprays, birds, and insects, 8th century

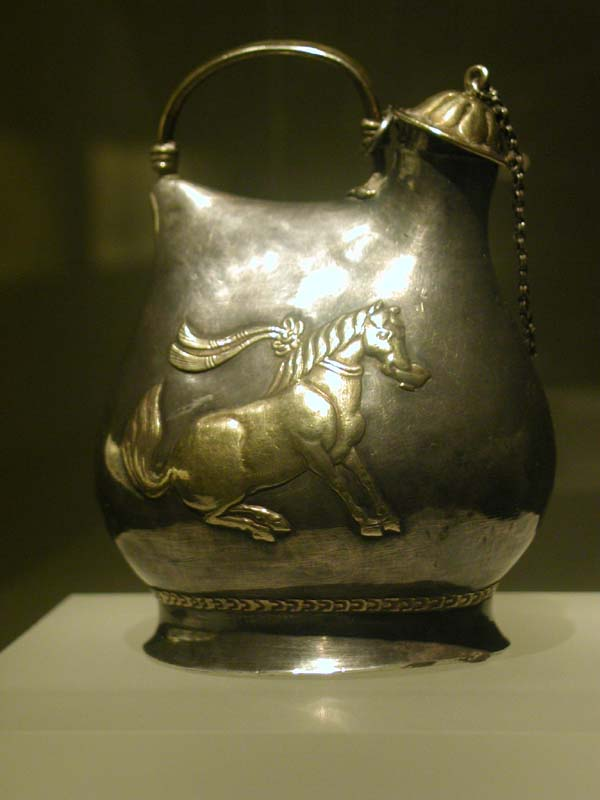
Silver-gilt ewer imitating a leather shape, from the Hejia Village hoard

== Architecture ==
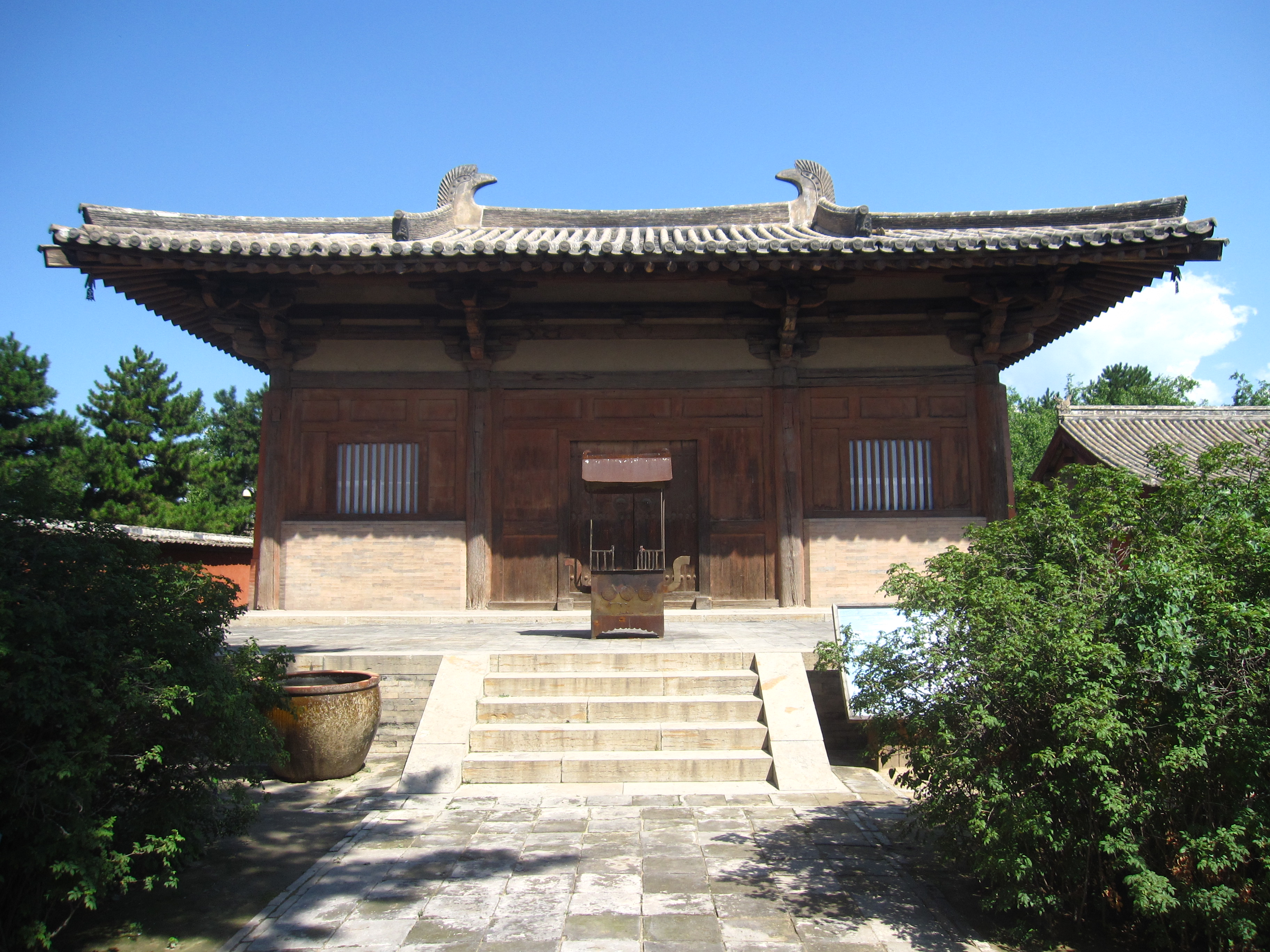
Nanchan Temple (Wutai), 782, the oldest wooden building in China.

There had been an enormous amount of building of Buddhist temples and monasteries, but in 845 these were all confiscated by the government, and the great majority destroyed. The normal construction material for buildings other than towers, pagodas, and military works in the Tang was still wood, which does not survive very long if not maintained. The rock-cut architecture of the famous surviving sites of course survives neglect far better, but the Chinese generally left the external facades of cave-temples unornamented, unlike the Indian equivalents at sites like the Ajanta Caves.

Two large Tang pagodas survive in the capital, now Xi'an, which otherwise has few remains dating back to the Tang. The oldest is the Giant Wild Goose Pagoda, rebuilt in 704 in brick, and reduced in height after damage in the 1556 Shaanxi earthquake. The Small Wild Goose Pagoda was also rebuilt in 704, but only lost a few metres in the earthquake. Some Tang pagodas tried to reconcile the form with the Indian shikara temple tower, or even had a stupa as part of the superstructure; the Tahōtō at the Ishiyama-dera temple in Japan is a surviving later example, with a roof on top of the stupa.

The main hall of the relatively small rural Nanchan Temple has a main structure of wood. Much of it appears to have survived from the original construction in 782, and it is recognised as the oldest wooden building in China. The third oldest is the main hall of the nearby Foguang Temple of 857.

Both are studied for their dougong bracketing systems, joining the roof to the walls. These complicated arrangements persisted until the end of traditional Chinese architecture, but are often considered to have reached a peak of elegance and harmony in the Song and Yuan dynasties, before becoming over-elaborate and fussy. The Tang examples show an increase in complexity before the great periods, and the beginnings of the uplift at the edges of roof lines that was to grow stronger in later periods. Japan has preserved rather more temple halls built in very similar styles (or in many cases has carefully rebuilt them as exact replicas over the centuries).

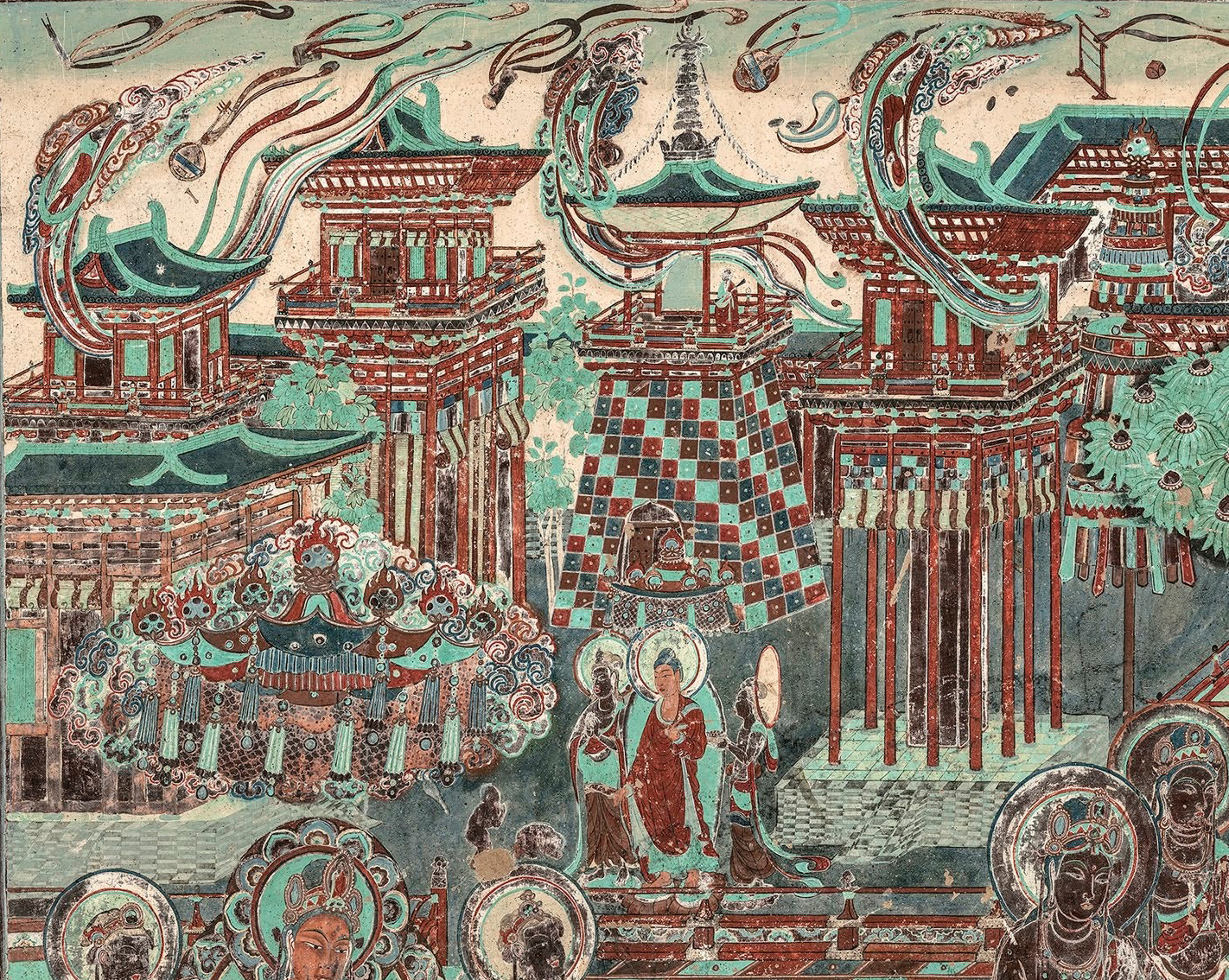
Buddhist mural of Tang dynasty architecture from Mogao Caves.

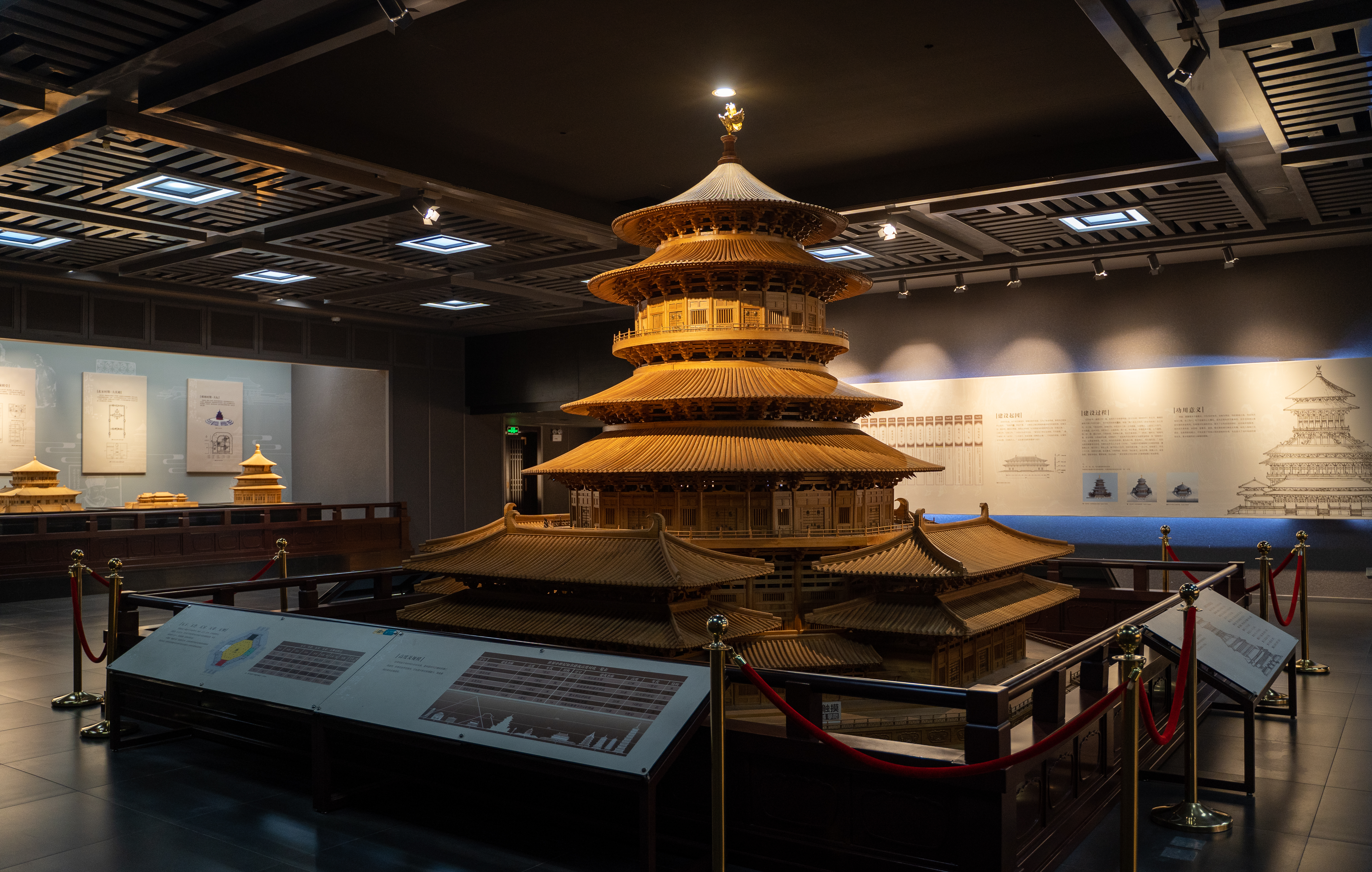
Model of Bright Hall of Luoyang during Wu Zetian's reign.

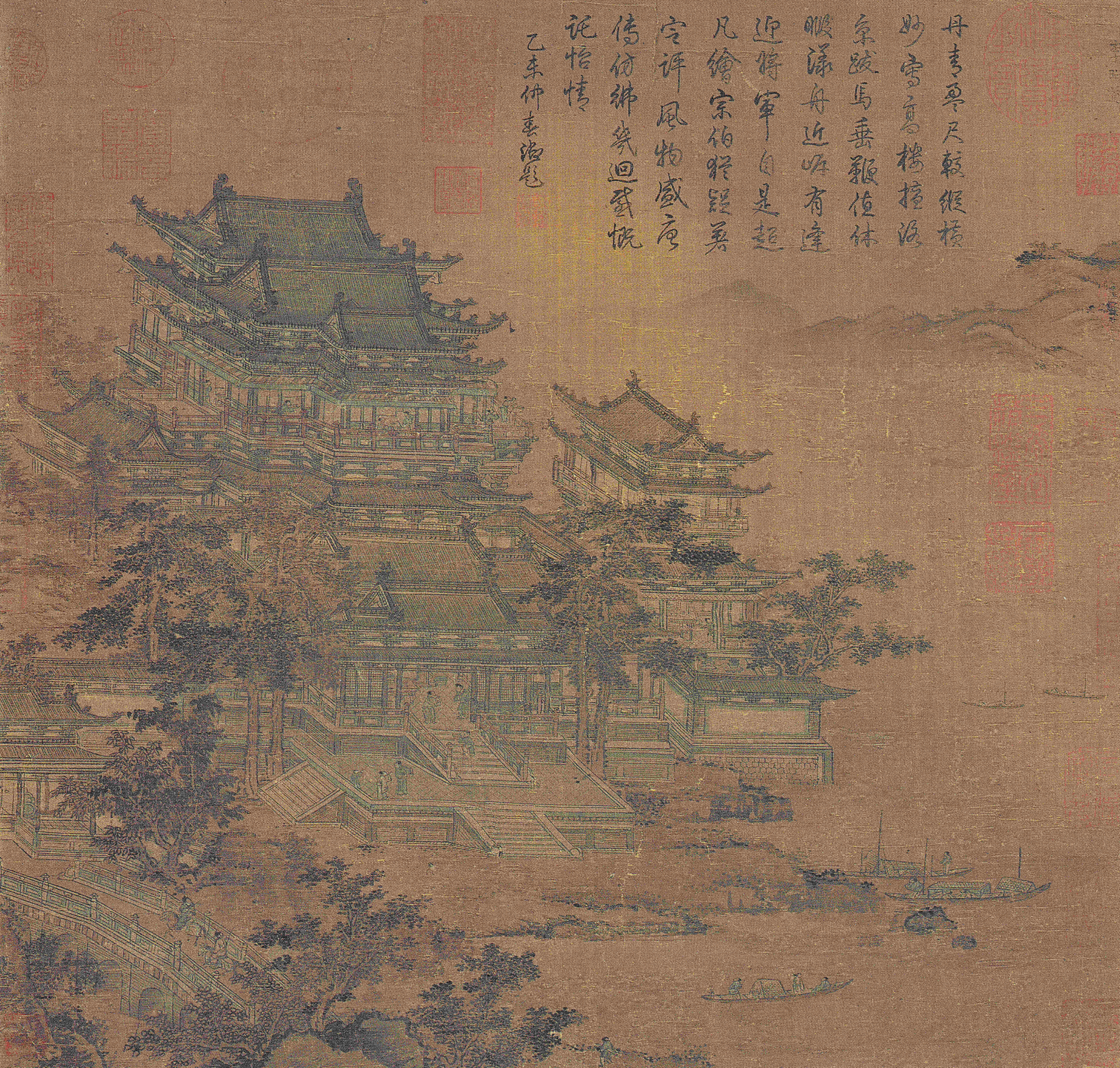
Luoyang Pavilion by Li Zhaodao (fl. early 8th c.)

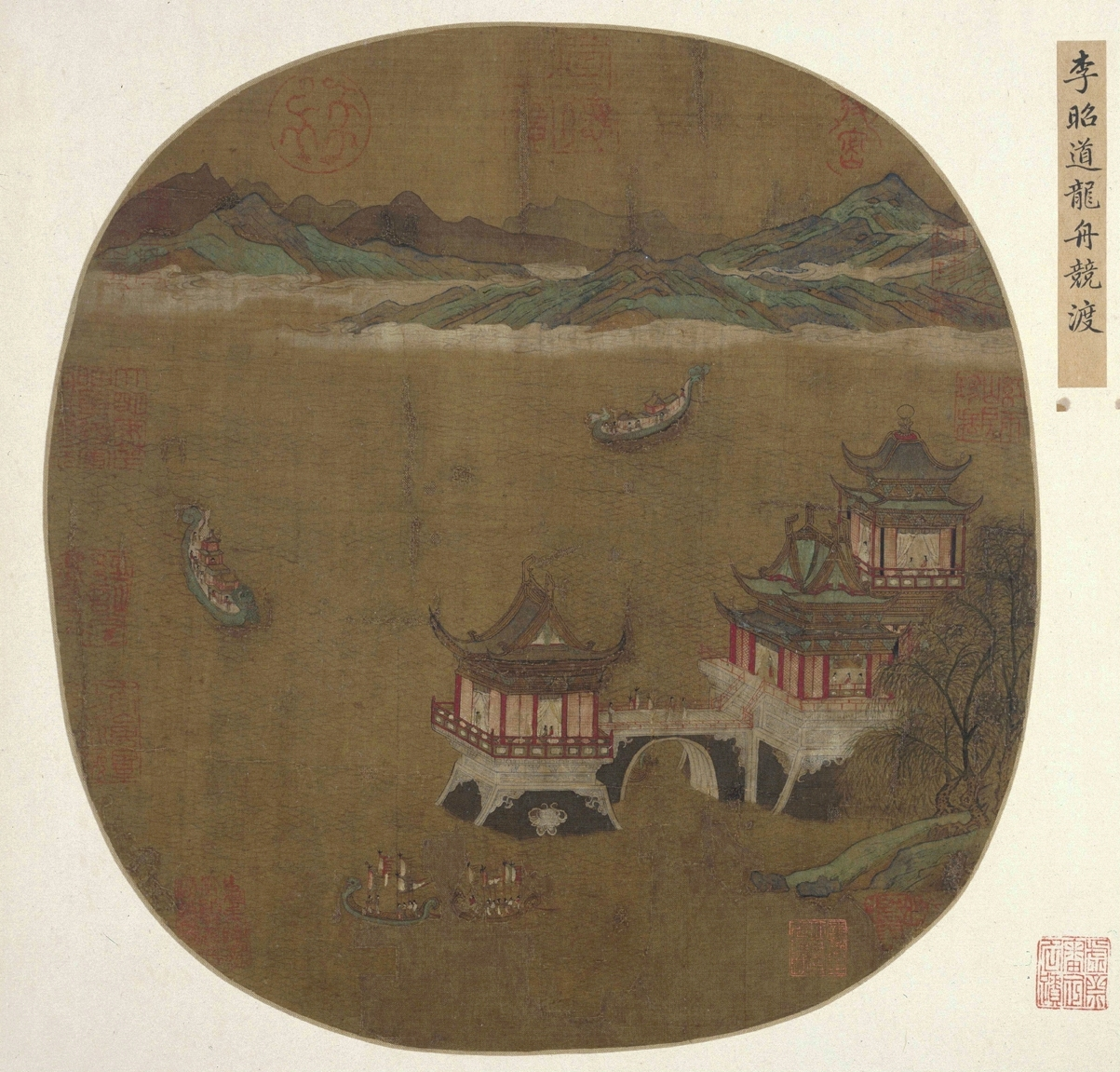
Dragon boat race by Li Zhaodao (675-758)

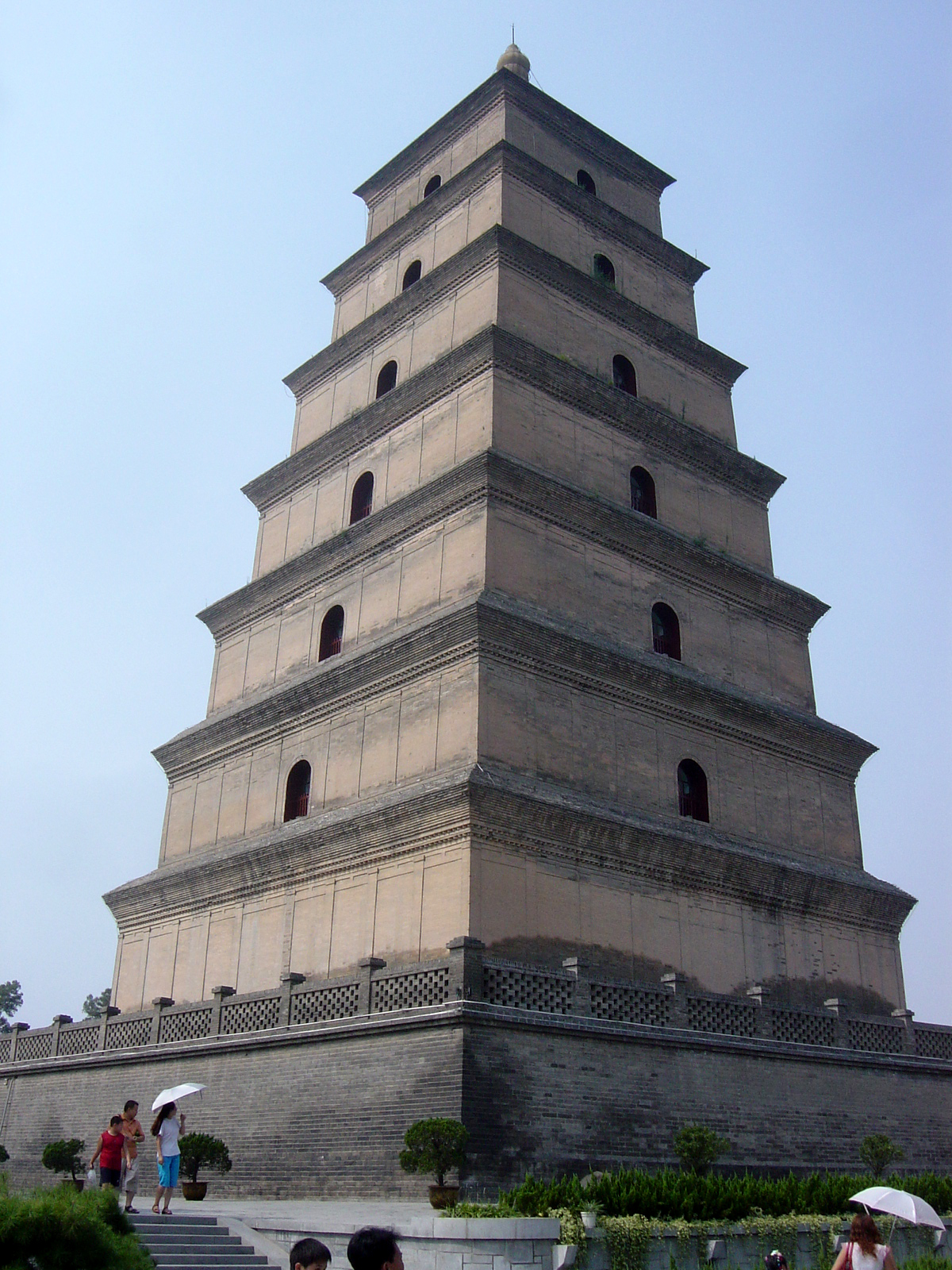
Giant Wild Goose Pagoda in Xi'an, 704

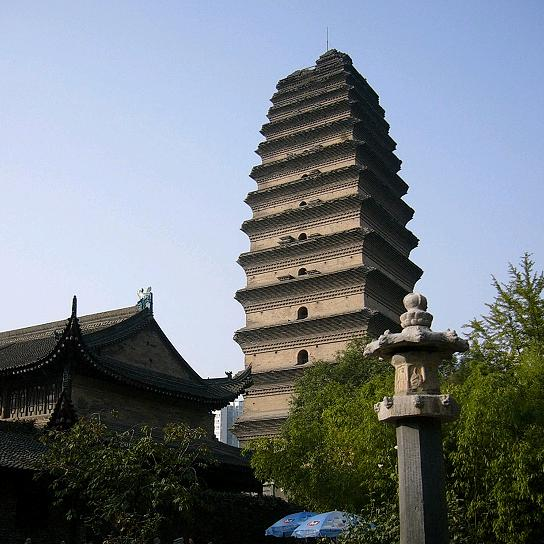
Small Wild Goose Pagoda in Xi'an, 704

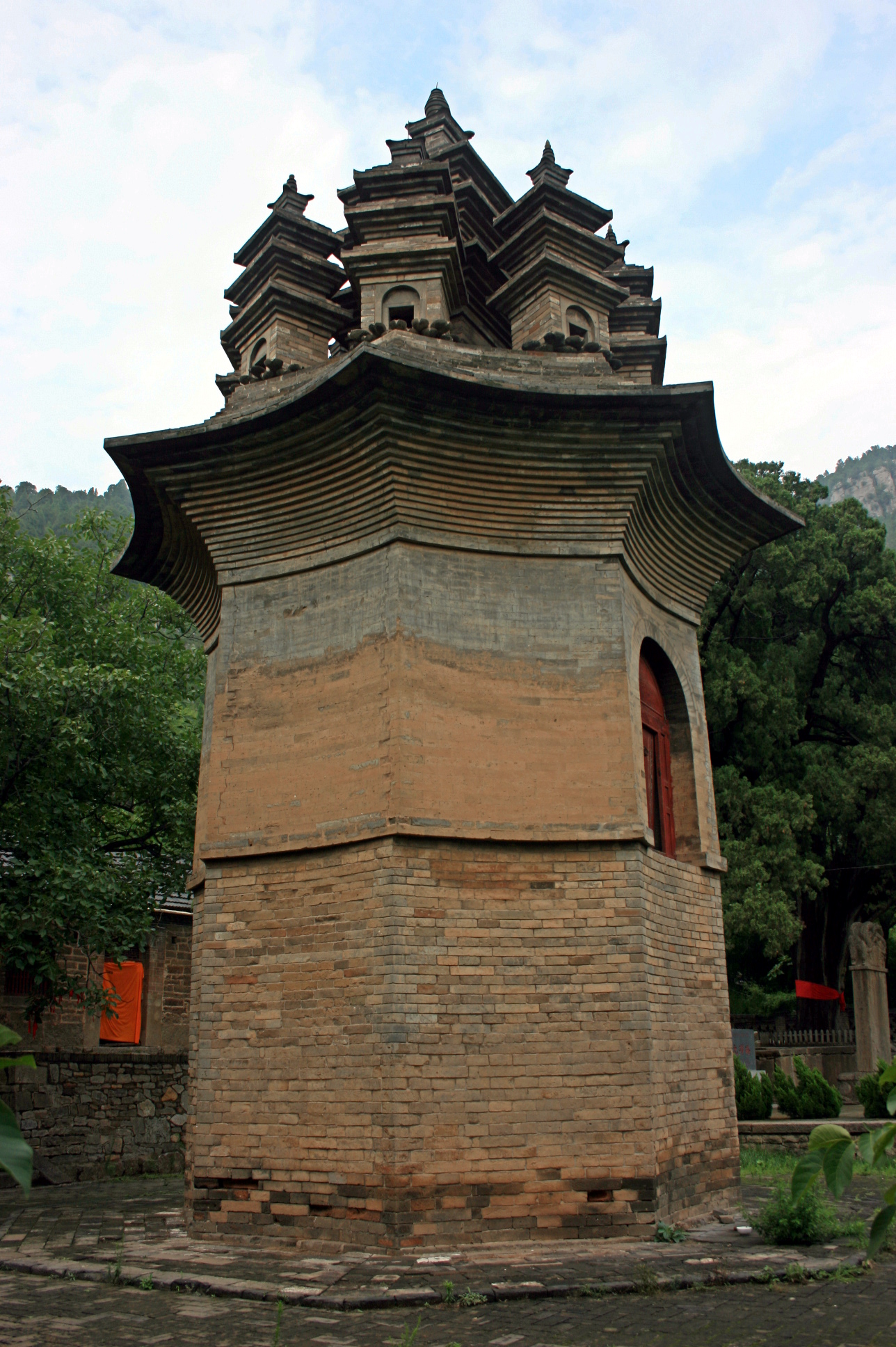
The Nine Pinnacle Pagoda of Shandong, completed by 756 and crowned with an unusual set of miniature pagodas; it is also unique for its octagonal, rather than square, base plan.

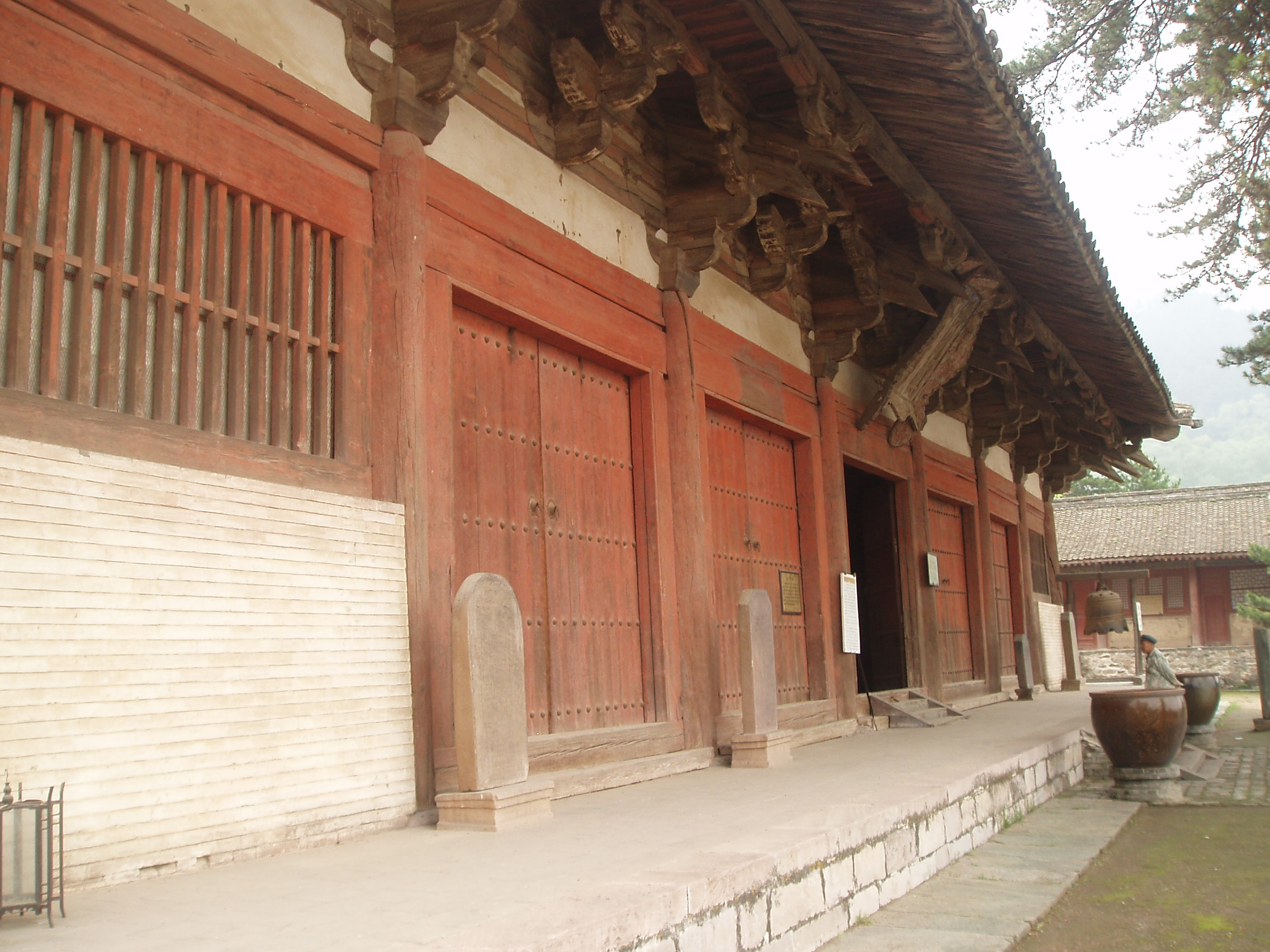
The dougong bracketing system at Foguang Temple, Mount Wutai, Shanxi, 857

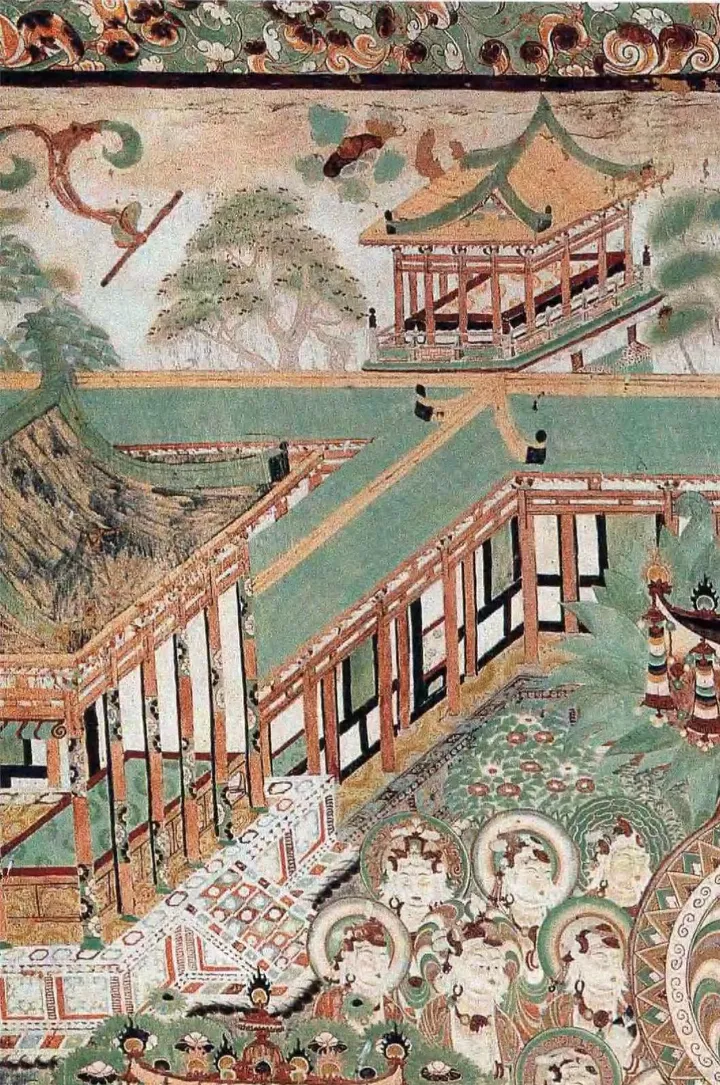
Middle-Tang dynasty Mogao Grotto mural of architecture.

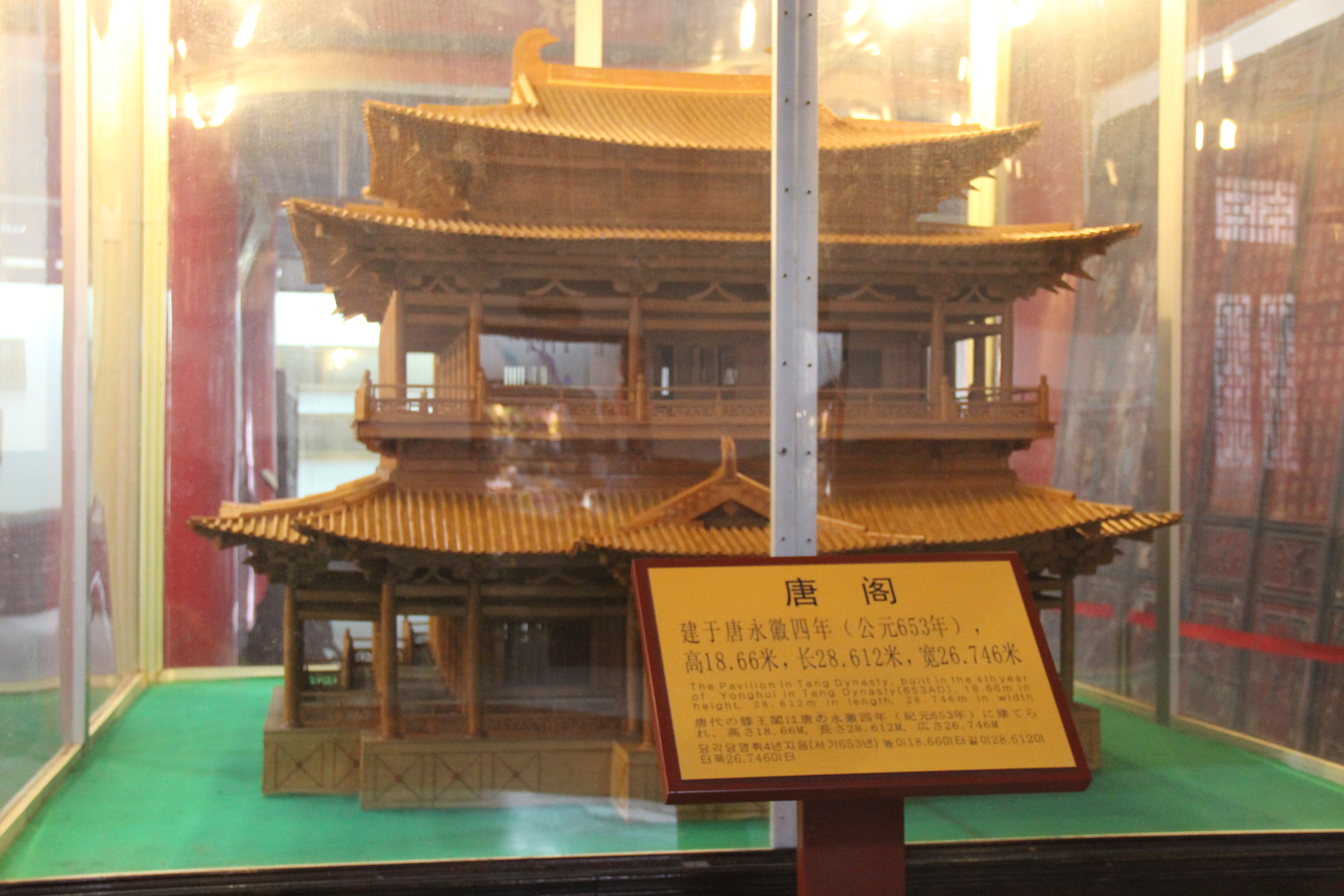
Model of Tang era Pavilion of Prince Teng.

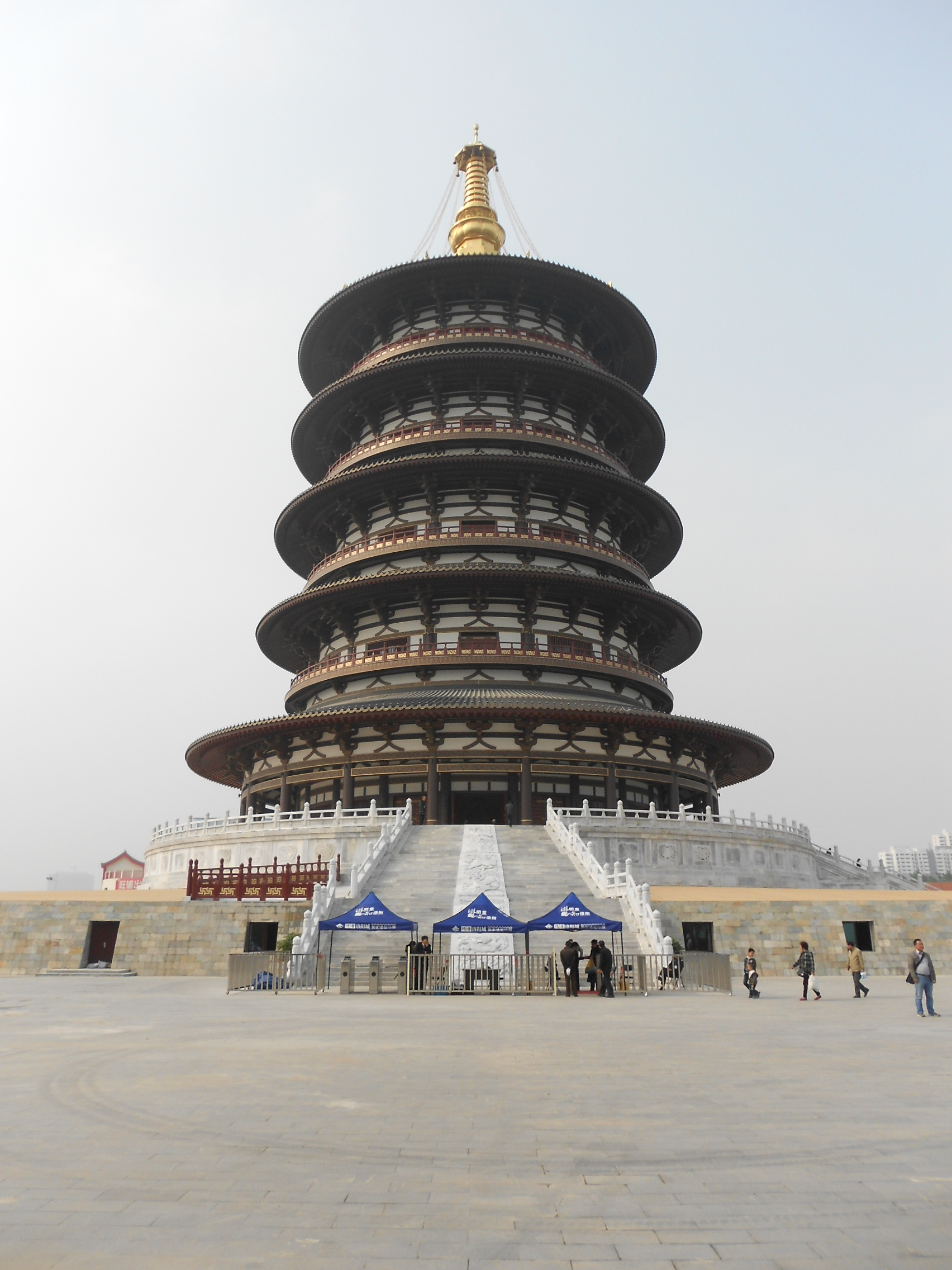
Reconstructed Hall of Heaven at Luoyang, originally built during Wu Zetian's reign.

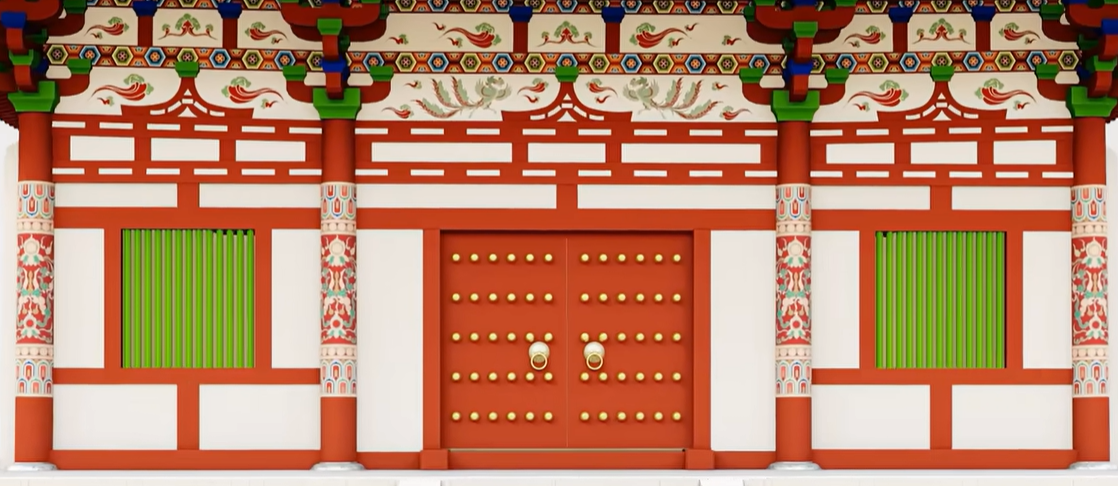
Recreation of Caihua or painted motifs on Tang dynasty architecture.

== Music ==
The first major well-documented flowering of Chinese music was for the qin during the Tang dynasty, though the qin is known to have been played since before the Han dynasty.

Late 20th century excavations of an intact tomb of the period revealed not only a number of instruments (including a spectacular concert bell set) but also inscribed tablets with playing instructions and musical scores for ensemble concerts, which are now heard again as played on reproduction instruments at the Hubei Provincial Museum.

== Opera ==
Chinese opera is generally dated back to the Tang dynasty with Emperor Xuanzong (712–755), who founded the Pear Garden, the first known opera troupe in China. The troupe mostly performed for the emperors' personal pleasure.

== Poetry ==
The poetry of the Tang dynasty is perhaps the most highly regarded poetic era in Chinese poetry. The shi, the classical form of poetry which had developed in the late Han dynasty, reached its zenith. The anthology Three Hundred Tang Poems, compiled much later, remains famous in China.

During the Tang dynasty, poetry became popular, and writing poetry was considered a sign of learning. One of China's greatest poets was Li Po, who wrote about ordinary people and about nature, which was a powerful force in Chinese art. One of Li Po's short poems, "Waterfall at Lu-Shan", shows how Li Po felt about nature.

== Tang dynasty artists ==
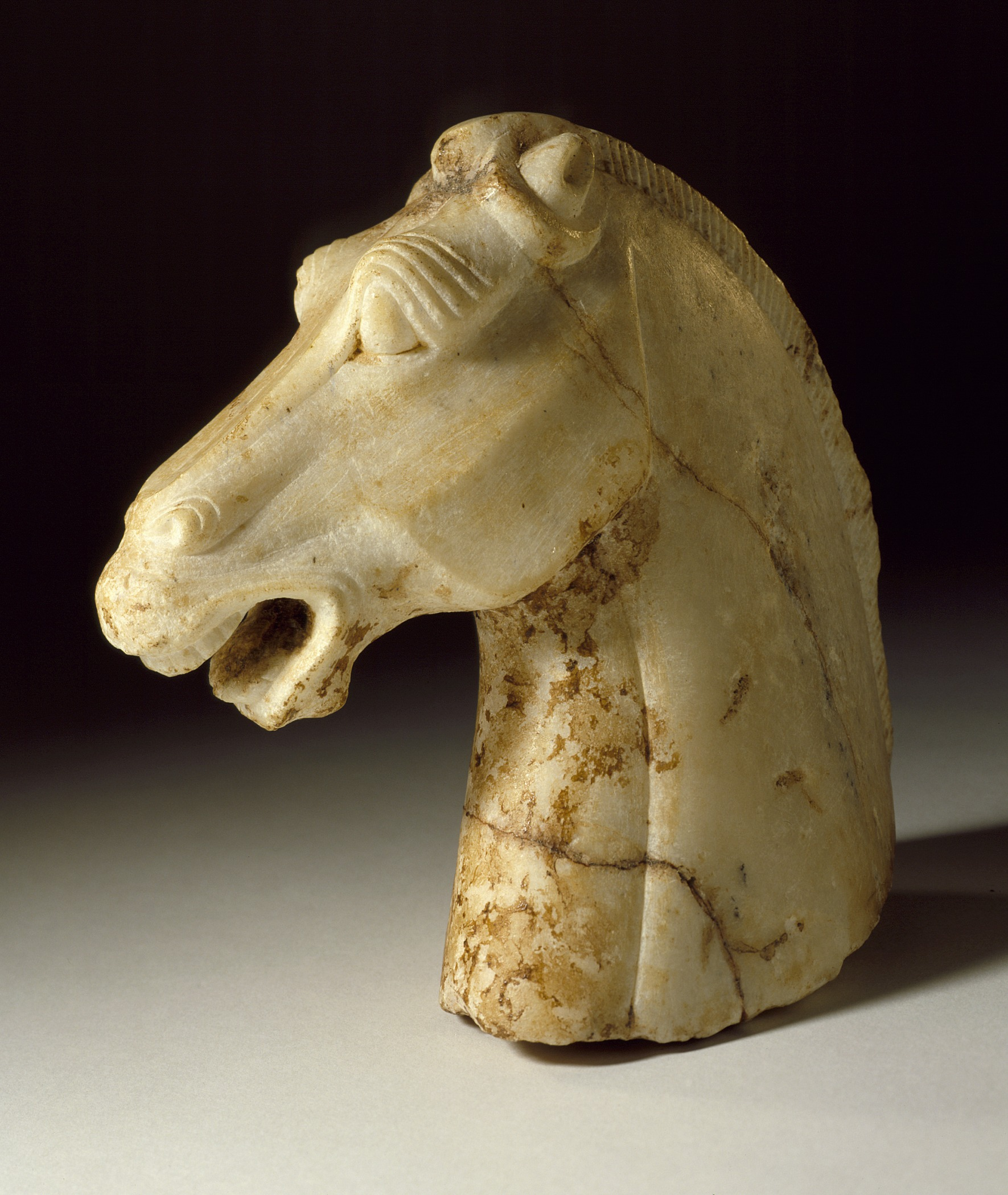
Marble horse head, Tang dynasty

- Bai Juyi (772–846), poet
- Zhou Fang (730–800), painter, also known as Zhou Jing Xuan and Zhong Lang
- Cui Hao (?–754), poet
- Han Gan (718–780), painter
- Zhang Xuan (713–755), painter
- Du Fu (712–770), poet
- Li Bai (701–762), poet
- Meng Haoran (689 or 691–740), poet
- Wang Wei (699–759), poet, musician, painter
- Wu Tao-Tzu (680–740), famous for the myth of entering an art work
- Zhang Jiuling (678–740), poet

== See also ==
- Chinese art
- Qianling Mausoleum
