= Xi'an =

Capital and largest city of Shaanxi, China

Xi'an 西安市 Sian, Singan, Hsi-an, Hsi-ngan
- Sub-provincial and prefecture-level city
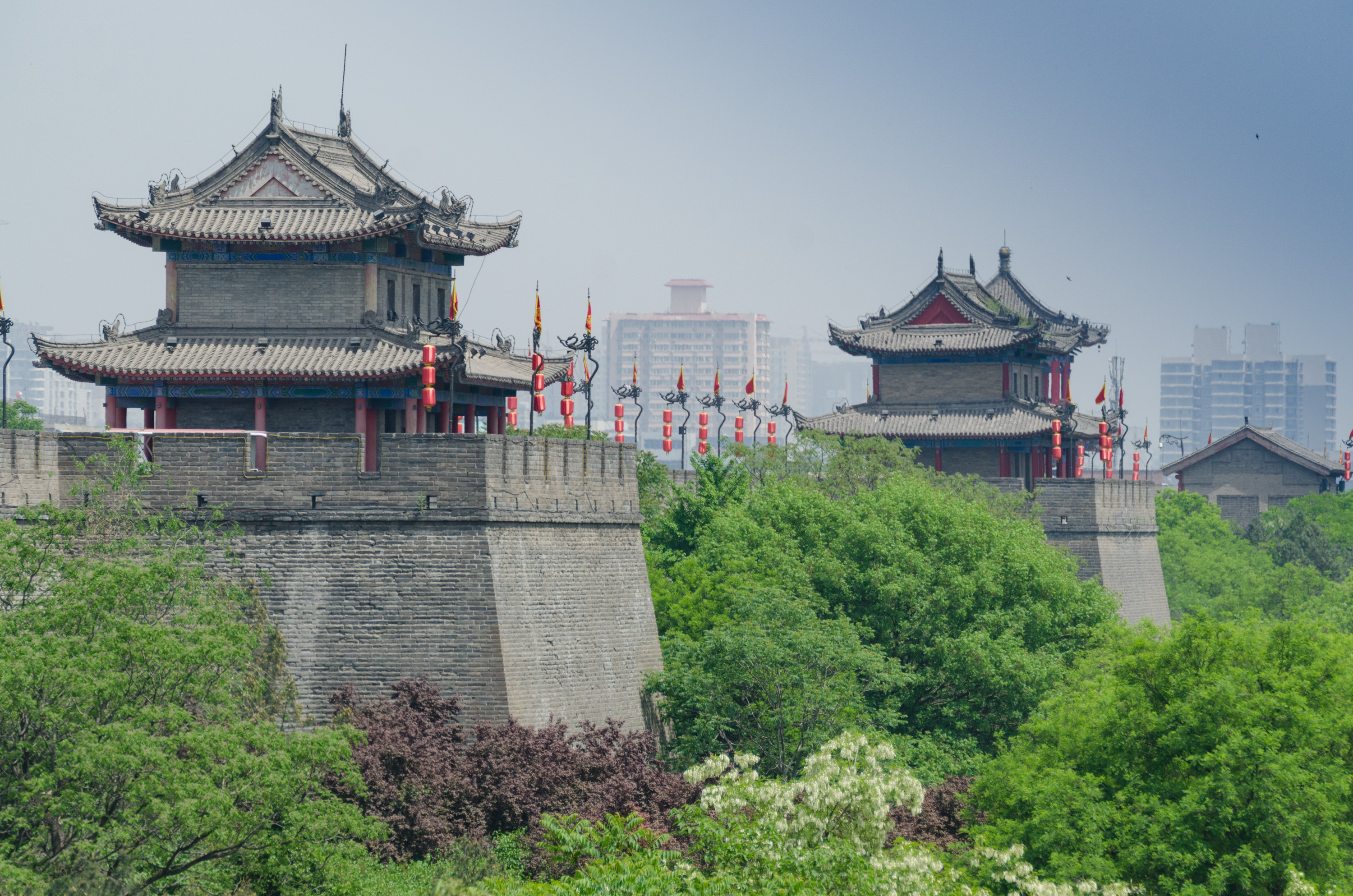
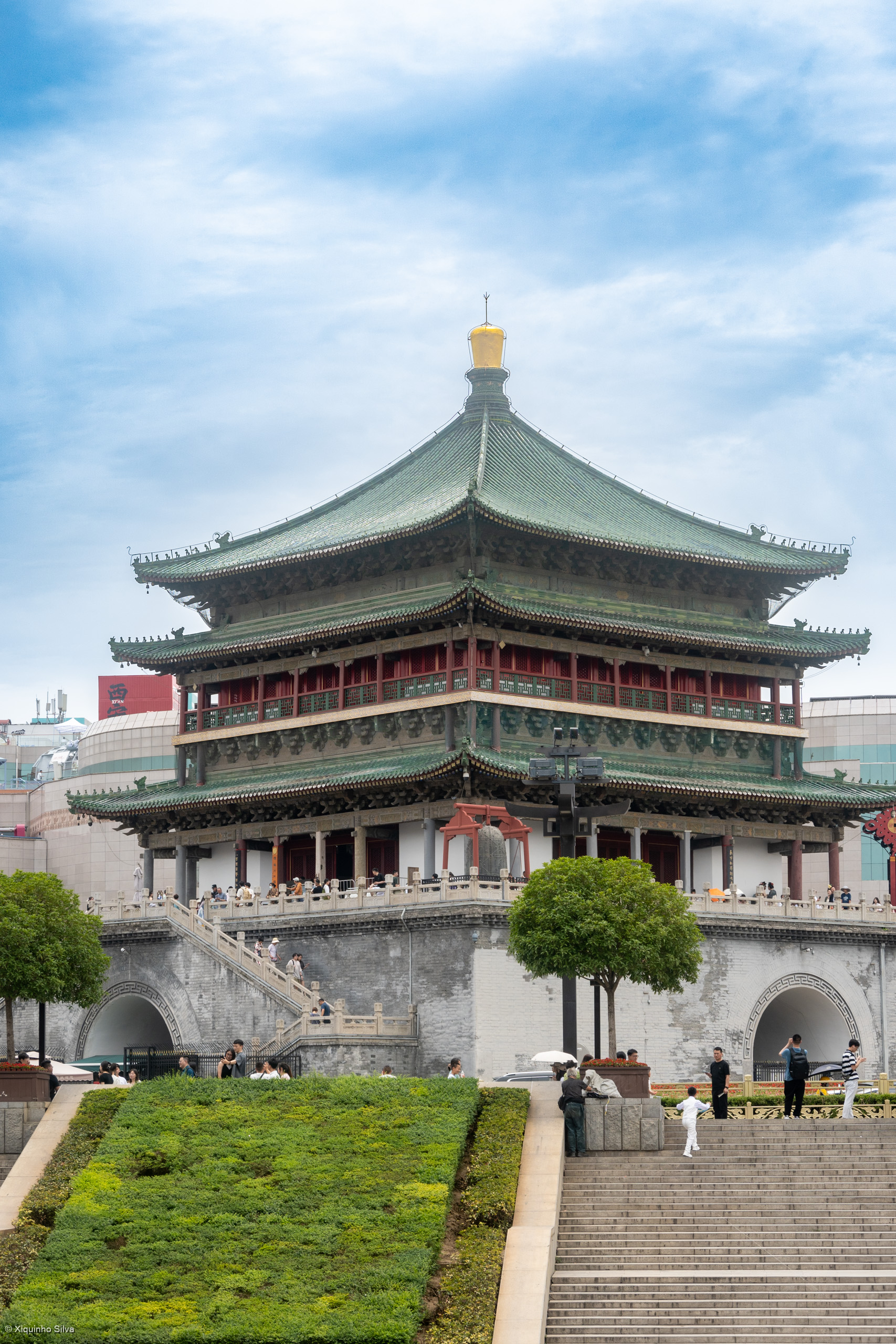
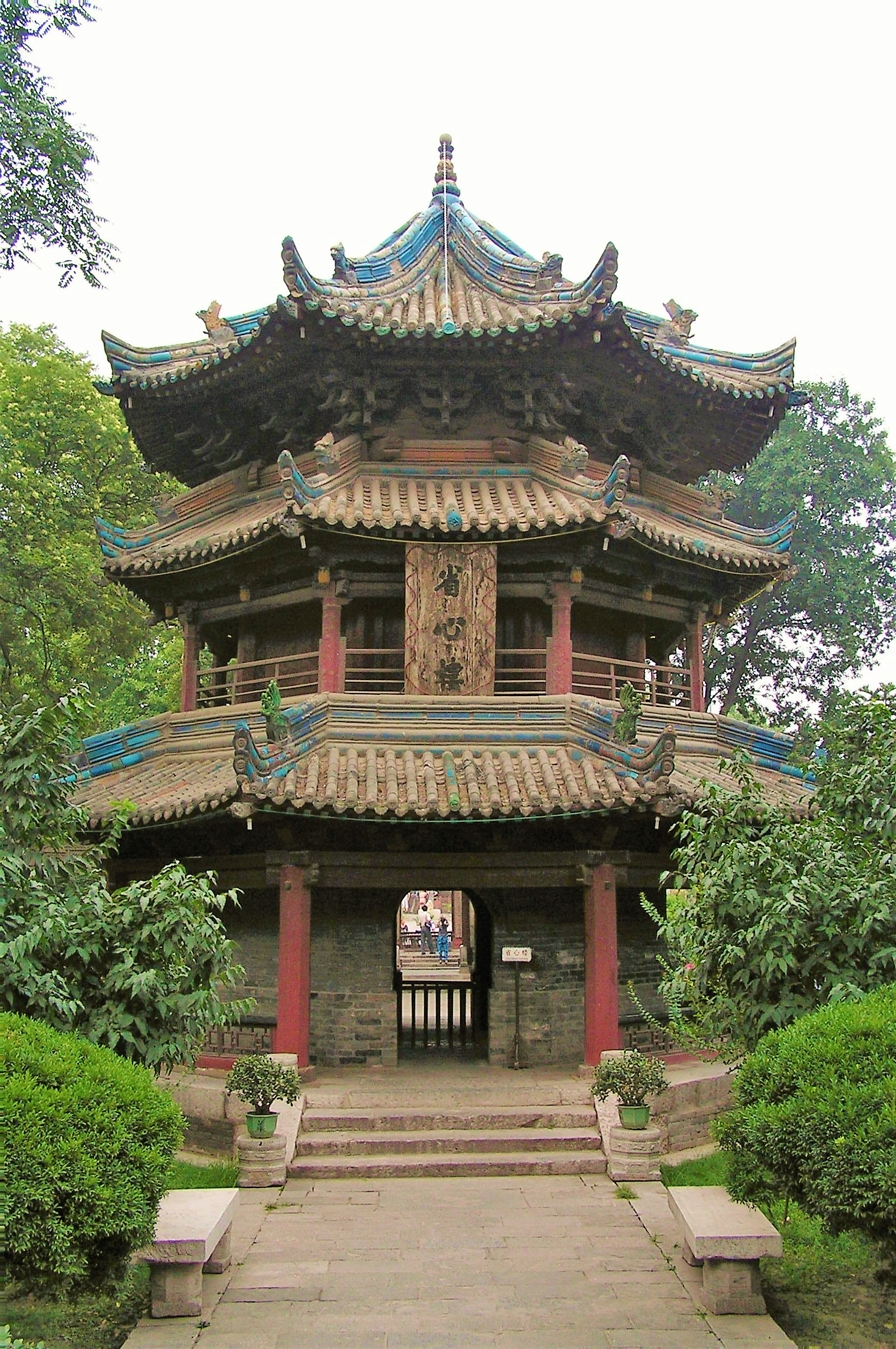
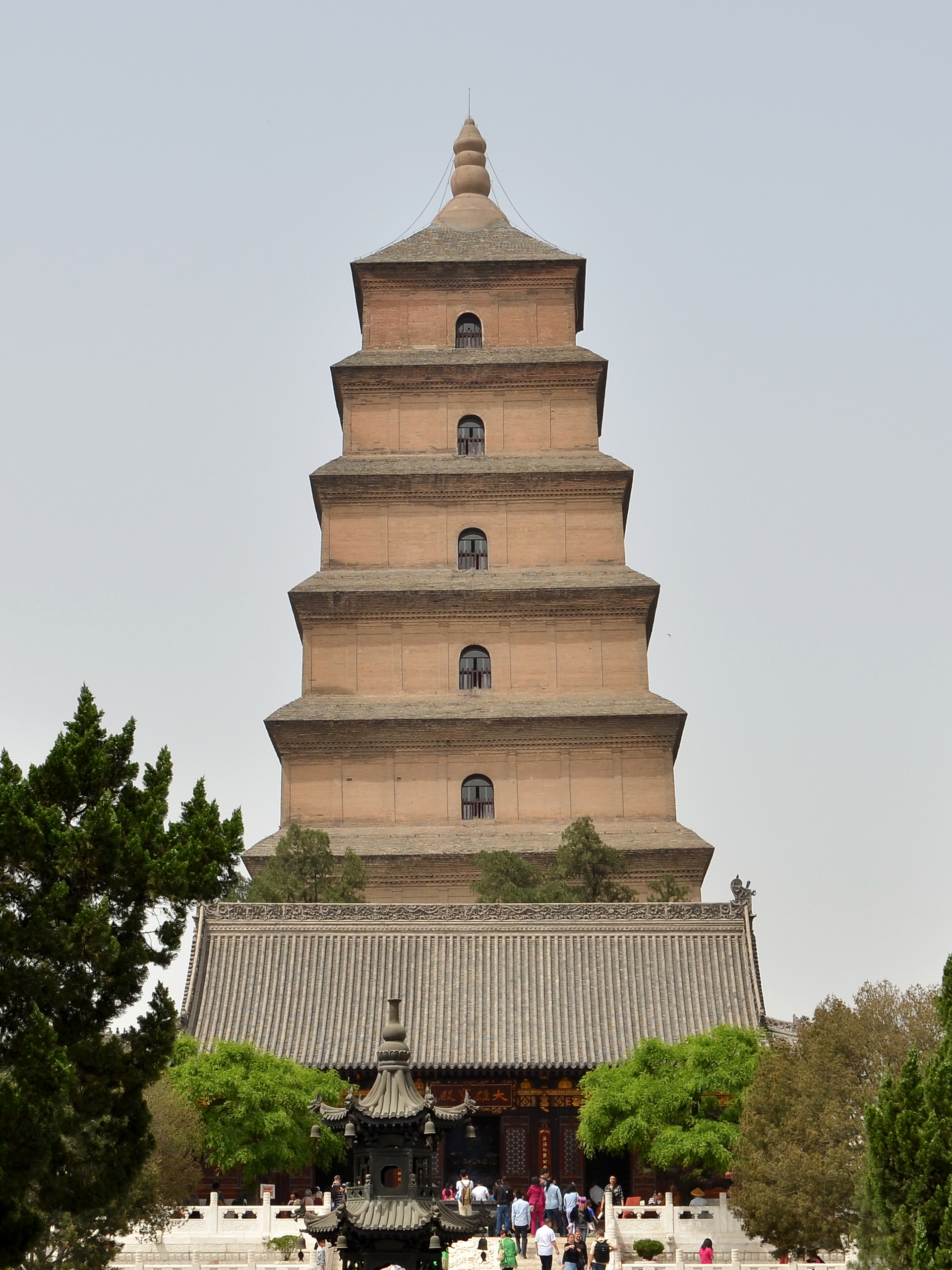
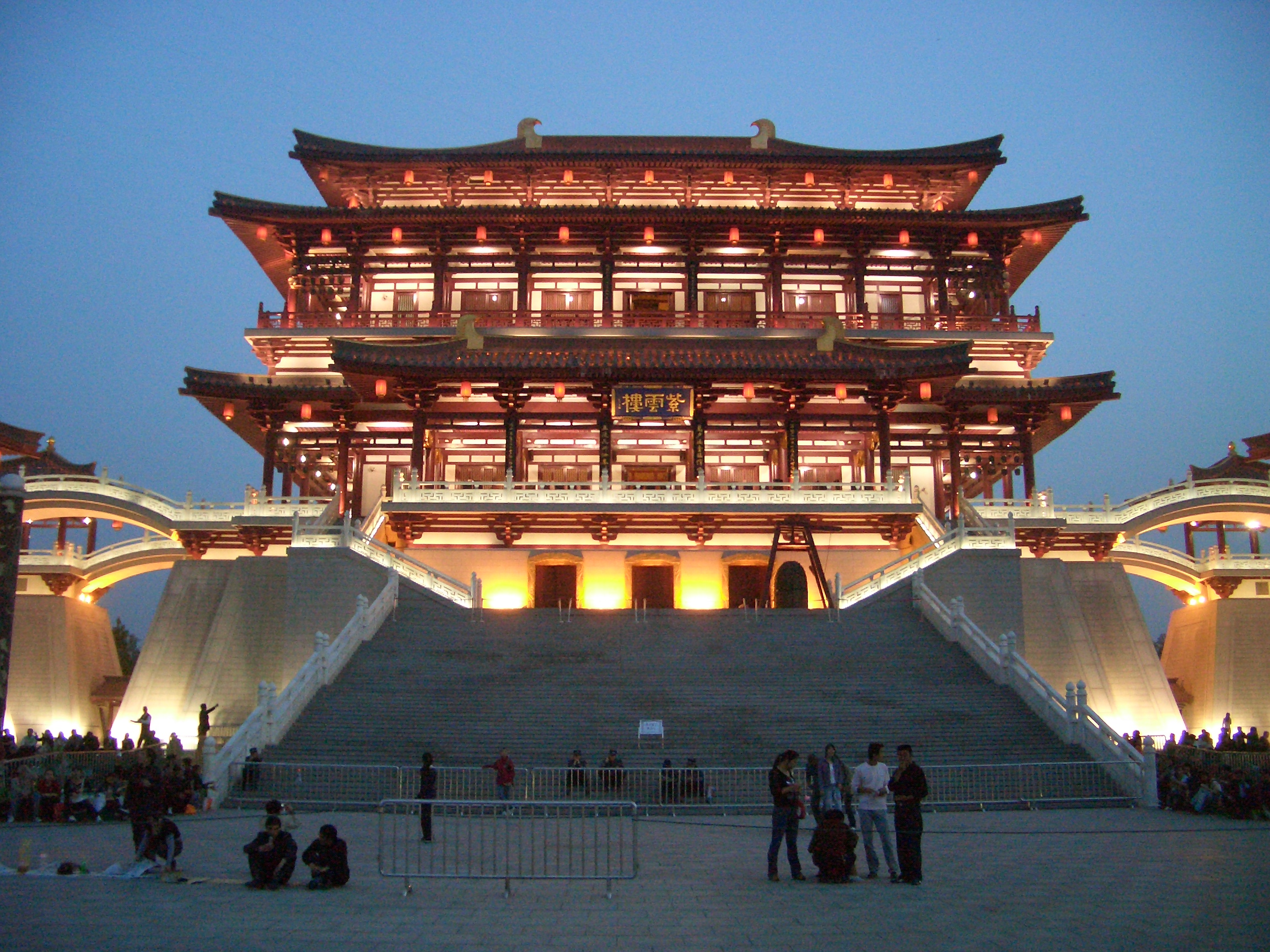
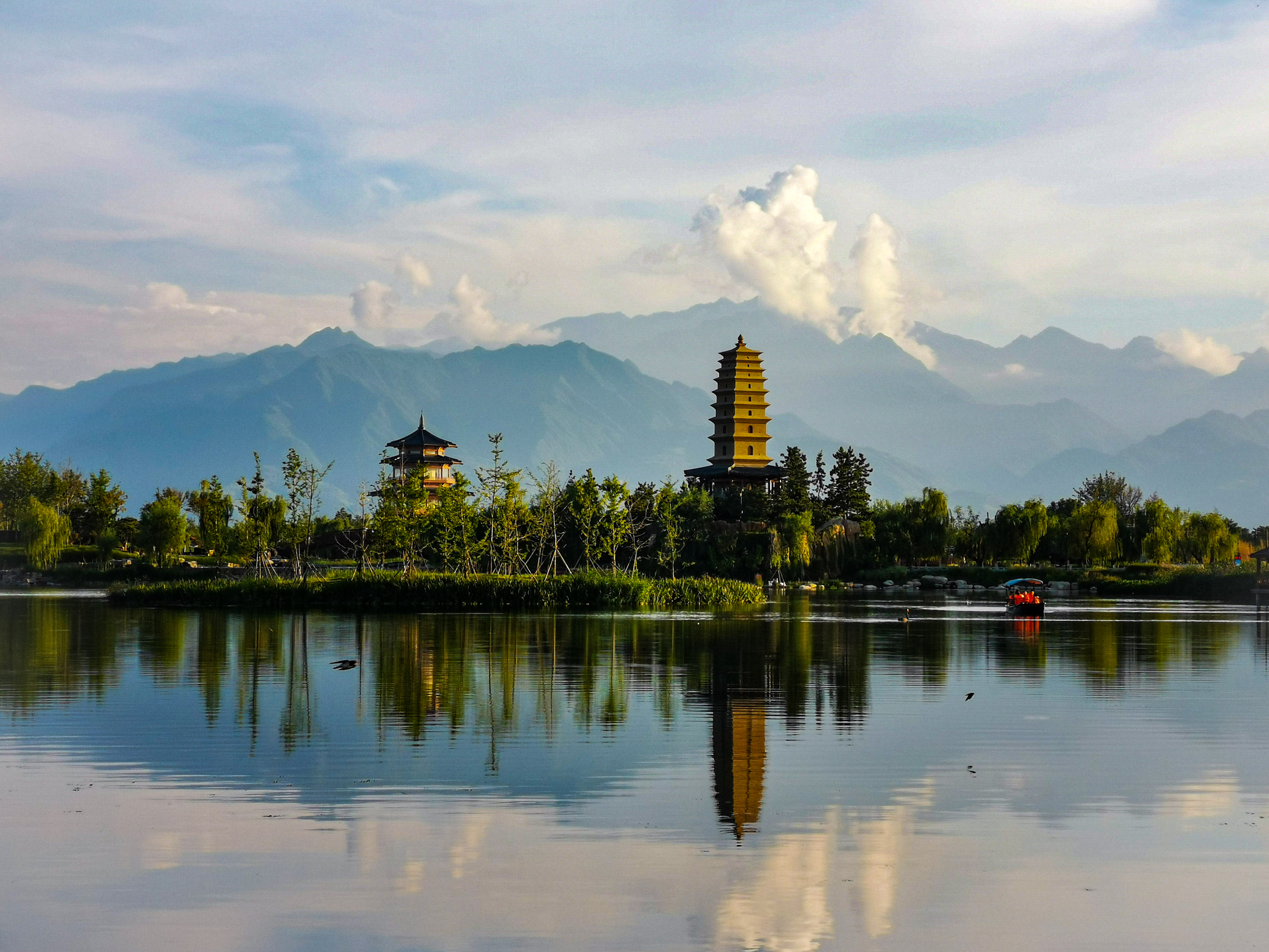
- Xi'an City Wall Terracotta Army Bell Tower Great Mosque of Xi'an Giant Wild Goose Pagoda Tang Paradise Meibei Lake and Qinling

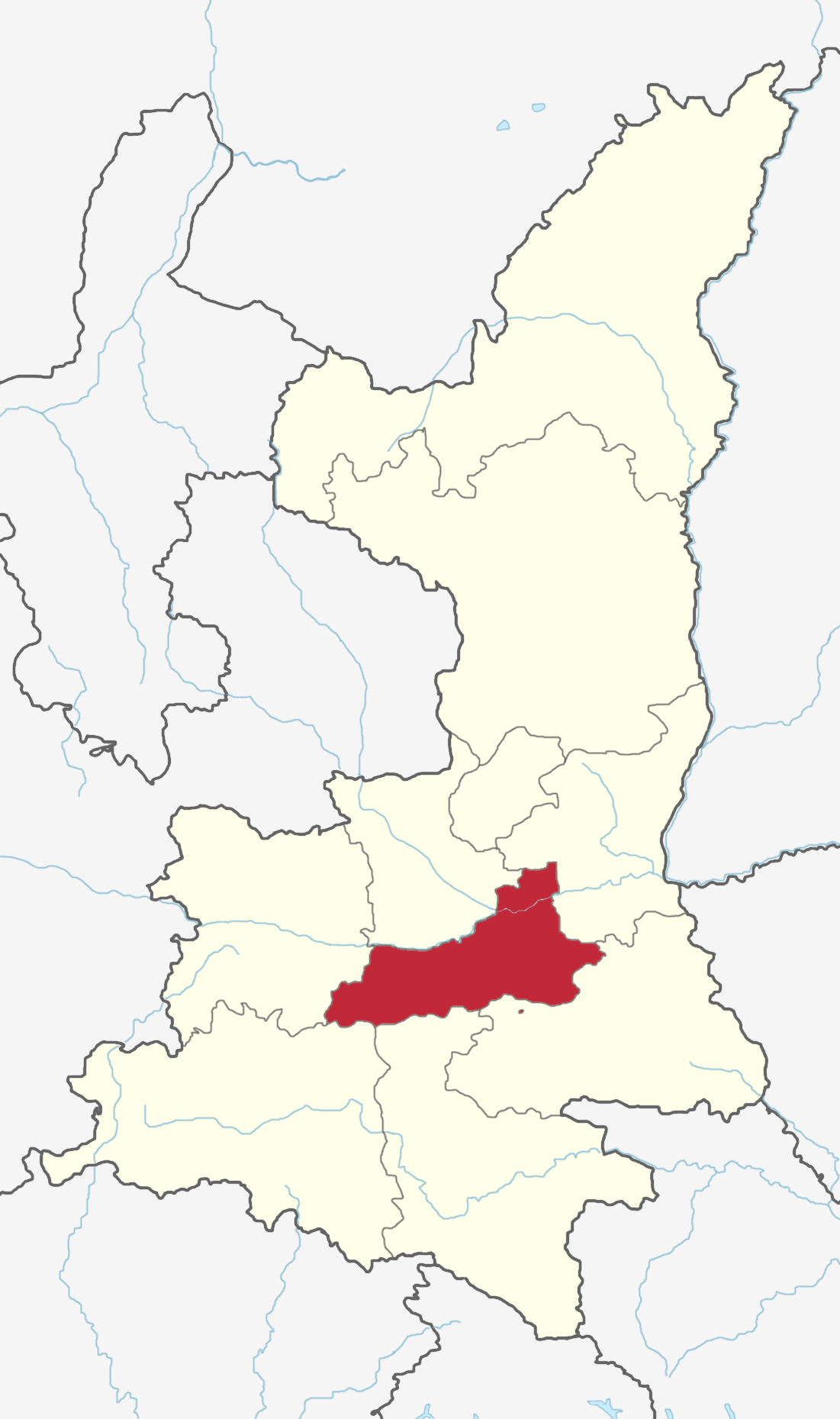
- Xi'an municipality within Shaanxi

- Location in China
- Coordinates (Shaanxi provincial government): 34°15′40″N 108°56′32″E
- Country: China
- Province: Shaanxi
- Municipal seat: Weiyang District

Government
  - Type: Sub-provincial city
  - Body: Xi'an Municipal People's Congress
  - Municipal Party Secretary: Hao Huijie
  - Municipal Congress Chairman: Zhao Jing
  - Mayor: Ye Niuping
  - Municipal CPPCC Chairman: Wang Jide

Area
  - City: 10,762 km^{2} (4,155 sq mi)
  - Urban: 5,808.6 km^{2} (2,242.7 sq mi)
  - Metro: 4,903.9 km^{2} (1,893.4 sq mi)
- Elevation: 405 m (1,329 ft)

Population (2020 census)
  - City: 12,952,907
  - Density: 1,203.6/km^{2} (3,117.3/sq mi)
  - Urban: 11,904,805
  - Urban density: 2,049.5/km^{2} (5,308.2/sq mi)
  - Metro: 12,283,922
  - Metro density: 2,504.9/km^{2} (6,487.7/sq mi)

GDP
  - City: CN¥1.201 trillion (US$154.2 billion)
  - Per capita: CN¥98,205 (US$15,108)
- Time zone: UTC+8 (CST)
- Postal code: 710000–710090
- Area code: 29
- ISO 3166 code: CN-SN-01
- License plate prefixes: 陕A、陕U
- City Flower: Pomegranate flower
- City Tree: Pagoda tree
- Website: XA.gov.cn

Chinese name
- Chinese: 西安
- Postal: Sianfu
- Literal meaning: Western peace
Transcriptions
Standard Mandarin
- Hanyu Pinyin: Xī'ān
- Bopomofo: ㄒㄧ ㄢ
- Wade–Giles: Hsi^{1}-an^{1}
- Tongyong Pinyin: Si-an
- Yale Romanization: Syī-ān
- IPA: [ɕí.án]
Wu
- Romanization: Si^{平}oe^{平}
Yue: Cantonese
- Yale Romanization: Sāi-ōn
- Jyutping: Sai1-on1
- IPA: [sɐj˥.ɔn˥]
Southern Min
- Tâi-lô: Se-an

Alternative Chinese name
- Simplified Chinese: 长安
- Traditional Chinese: 長安
- Literal meaning: Perpetual peace
Transcriptions
Standard Mandarin
- Hanyu Pinyin: Cháng'ān
- Bopomofo: ㄔㄤˊ ㄢ
- Wade–Giles: Chʻang^{2}-an^{1}
- Tongyong Pinyin: Cháng-an
- Yale Romanization: Cháng-ān
- IPA: [ʈʂʰǎŋ.án]
Yue: Cantonese
- Yale Romanization: Chèuhng-ōn
- Jyutping: Coeng4-on1
- IPA: [tsʰœŋ˩.ɔn]
Southern Min
- Tâi-lô: Tn̂g-an
Middle Chinese
- Middle Chinese: ɖjang-an

Xi'an (Note: UK: /ʃiː.ˈæn/ shee-AN, US: /ʃiː.ˈɑːn/ shee-AHN Chinese: 西安; pinyin: Xī'ān; [ɕí.án]; previously romanized as Sian or Hsi-an) is the capital of the Chinese province of Shaanxi. A sub-provincial city on the Guanzhong plain, the city is the most populous in the province and third-most populous in Western China after Chongqing and Chengdu, as well as the most populous in Northwestern China. Based on the city's 2025 1% population sample survey, its estimated year-end resident population was 13.24 million, of whom 10.72 million were urban residents.

Xi'an is one of the oldest cities in China. Known as Chang'an throughout much of its history, Xi'an is one of China's Five Great Ancient Capitals, having held the position under several of the most important dynasties in Chinese history, including the Western Zhou, Qin, Western Han, Sui, Northern Zhou and Tang. Xi'an is now the second-most popular tourist destination in China. Xi'an contains the Mausoleum of the First Qin Emperor, including the Terracotta Army, and five component sites of the UNESCO-listed Silk Roads: the Routes Network of Chang'an-Tianshan Corridor.

Since the 1980s, as part of the economic growth of inland China especially for the central and northwest regions, Xi'an has developed into a cultural, industrial, political and educational, and research and development hub. Xi'an currently holds sub-provincial status, administering 11 districts and 2 counties. In 2020, Xi'an was ranked as a Beta- (global second tier) city by the Globalization and World Cities Research Network, and, according to the country's own ranking, ranked 17th; it is also one of the world's top 100 financial centers according to the Global Financial Centres Index. Xi'an is ranked as the 16th city globally by scientific output and first in Western China, and it is home to multiple prestigious educational institutions, such as Xi'an Jiaotong University, Northwestern Polytechnical University, Xidian University and Northwest University.

== Name ==
Xi'an is the atonal pinyin romanization of its Chinese name 西安, Western Peace. (The apostrophe – known in Chinese as a 隔音符號, géyīn fúhào – should be included to distinguish its pronunciation from the single syllable xian.) The name was adopted in 1369 under the early Ming dynasty. Jesuit missionaries recorded its name as Si-ngan or Si-ngan-fou from its status as the seat of a prefecture (府, fǔ). This form still appears in the Latin name of the Catholic diocese of Xi'an, archidioecesis Singanensis. The name was later romanized as Hsi-an by Wade & Giles and as Sianfu or Sian by the imperial post office, both of which were common until the promulgation of pinyin.

The area of present-day Xi'an has been the site of several important former Chinese cities. The capital of the Western Zhou were the twin cities of Feng and Hao, known collectively as Fenghao, located on opposite banks of the Feng River at its confluence with the southern bank of the Wei in the western suburbs of present-day Xi'an. The Qin capital Xianyang was erected north of the Wei during the Warring States period and was succeeded by the Western Han capital of Chang'an (長安), meaning "Perpetual Peace", which was located south of the Wei and covered the central area of present-day Xi'an. During the Eastern Han, Chang'an was also known as the "Western Capital" (西京), named for its namesake position relative to the main capital at Luoyang. Under the Sui, its name became Daxing (大興, "Greatly Prosperous") in AD 581. Under the Tang, the name reverted to Chang'an in 618. Under the Mongolian Yuan dynasty (13th & 14th centuries), it held a succession of names: Fengyuan (奉元), Anxi (安西, "Peaceful West") and Jingzhao (京兆). The Ming name "Xi'an" was changed back to Xijing ("Western Capital", as above) between 1930 and 1943.

== History ==
=== Prehistory ===
The Lantian Man was discovered in 1963 in Lantian County, 50 km (31 mi) southeast of Xi'an, and dates back to at least 500,000 years before the present time. A 6,500-year-old Neolithic village, Banpo, was discovered in 1953 on the eastern outskirts of the city proper, which contains the remains of several well organized Neolithic settlements carbon dated to 5,600–6,700 years ago. The site is now home to the Xi'an Banpo Museum, built in 1957 to preserve the archaeological collection.

=== Ancient era ===
Xi'an became a cultural and political center of China in the 11th century BC with the founding of the Zhou dynasty. The capital of Zhou was established in the twin settlements of Fengjing (灃京) and Haojing (鎬京), together known as Fenghao, located southwest of contemporary Xi'an. The settlement was also known as Zōngzhōu (宗周) to indicate its role as the capital of the vassal states. In 738 BC, King Ping of Zhou moved the capital to Luoyang due to political unrest.

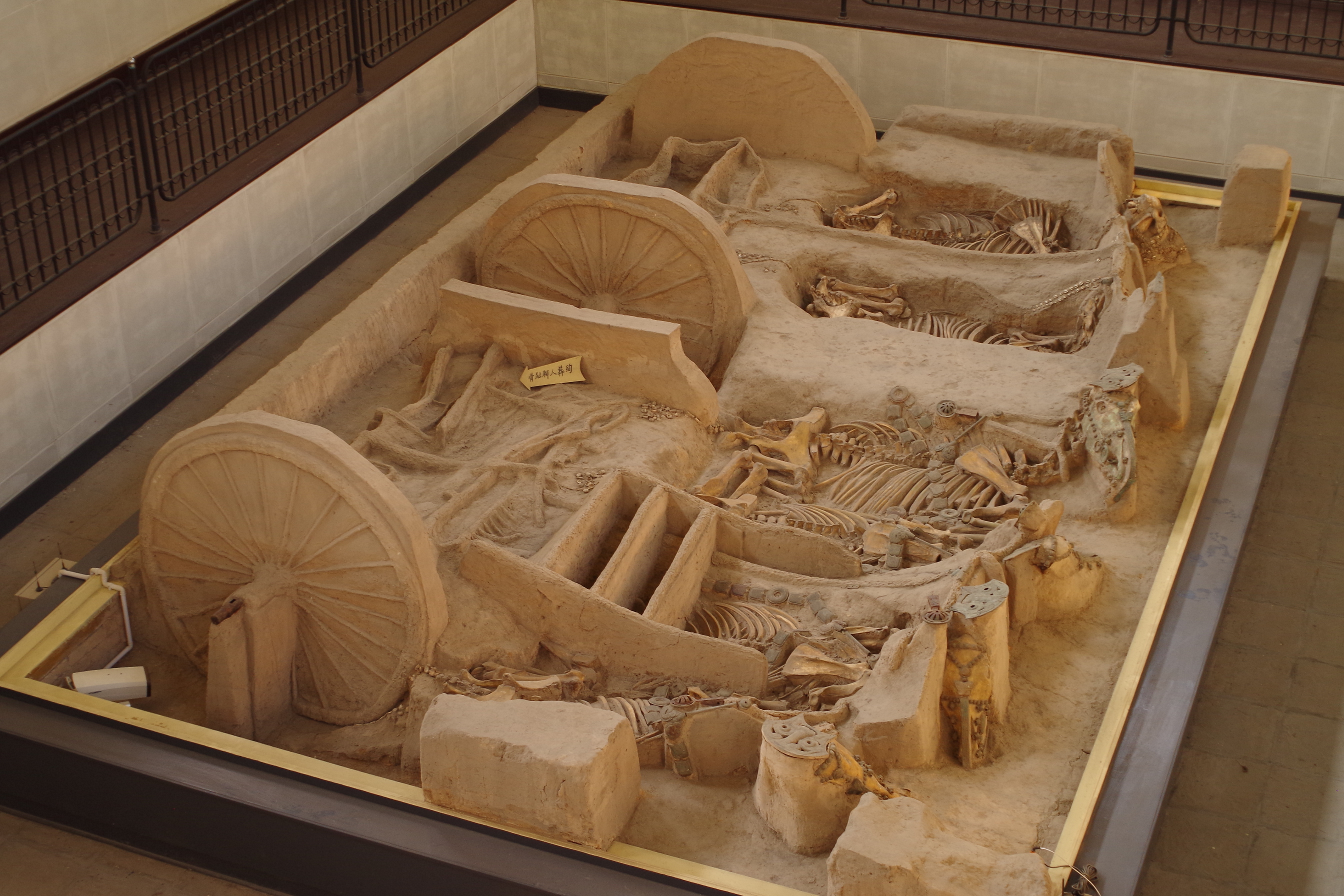
Remains of carriages and horses in Fenghao during the Western Zhou (11th–8th cent. BC)

=== Imperial era ===
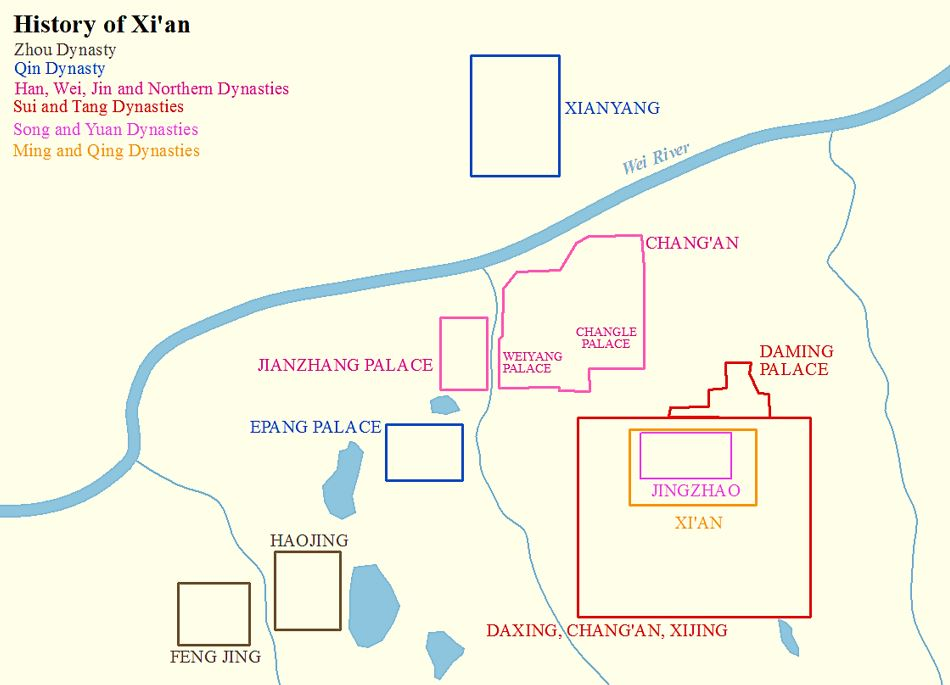
A map of the city walls of settlements in Xi'an from the Zhou to Qing dynasties

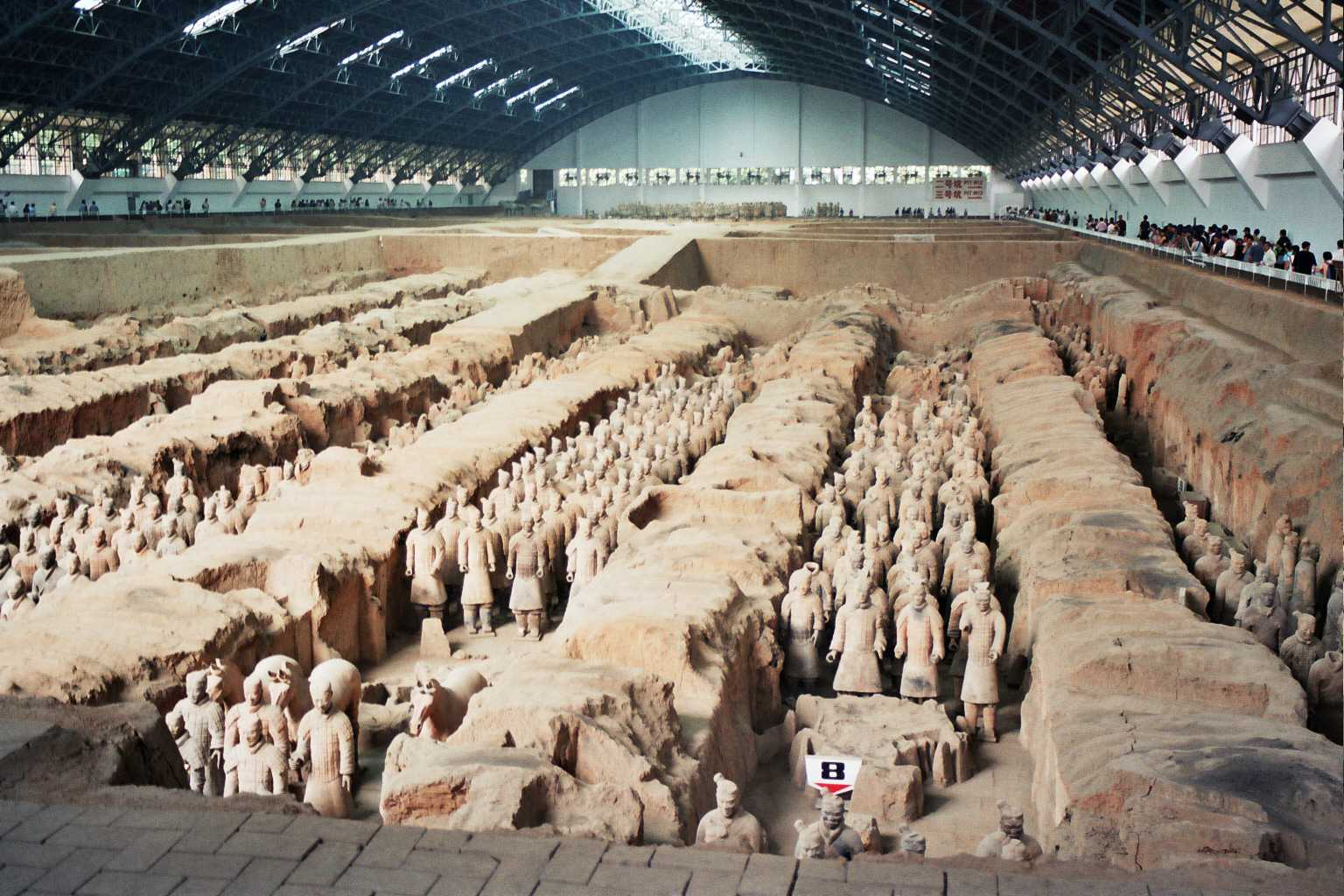
Terracotta Army inside the Qin Shi Huang Mausoleum, third century BC

Map of Chang'an under the Tang (7th–10th cent.)

Following the Warring States period, China was unified under the Qin dynasty (221–206 BC) for the first time, with the capital located at Xianyang, just northwest of modern Xi'an. The first emperor of China, Qin Shi Huang ordered the construction of the Terracotta Army and his mausoleum just to the east of Xi'an almost immediately after his ascension to the throne.

In 202 BC, the founding emperor Liu Bang of the Han dynasty established his capital in Chang'an County; his first palace, Changle Palace (長樂宮, "Perpetual Happiness") was built across the river from the ruin of the Qin capital. This is traditionally regarded as the founding date of Chang'an. Two years later, Liu Bang built Weiyang Palace (未央宮, "Never Ending Palace") north of modern Xi'an. Weiyang Palace was the largest palace ever built on Earth, covering 4.8 square kilometers (1,200 acres), which is 6.7 times the size of the current Forbidden City and 11 times the size of the Vatican City. The original Xi'an city wall was started in 194 BC and took 4 years to finish. Upon completion, the wall measured 25.7 km (15.97 mi) in length and 12 to 16 m (39.37–52.49 ft) in thickness at the base, enclosing an area of 36 km^{2} (13.90 sq mi). In AD 190, amidst uprisings and rebellions prior to the Three Kingdoms period, Dong Zhuo, a powerful warlord from nearby Xiliang, moved the court from Luoyang to Chang'an in a bid to avoid a coalition of other powerful warlords against him.

In 582, shortly after the Sui dynasty was founded, the emperor of Sui ordered a new capital to be built southeast of the Han capital, called Daxing (大興, "Great prosperity"). It consisted of three sections: the Imperial City, the palace section, and the civilian section, with a total area of 84 km^{2} (32 sq mi) within the city walls. At the time, it was the largest city in the world. The city was renamed Chang'an by the Tang dynasty. In the mid-7th century, after returning from his pilgrimage to India, the Buddhist monk Xuanzang established a translation school for Sanskrit scriptures.

Construction of the Giant Wild Goose Pagoda began in 652. This pagoda was 64 m (209.97 ft) in height, and was built to store the translations of Buddhist sutras obtained from India by Xuanzang. In 707, construction of the Small Wild Goose Pagoda began. This pagoda measured 45 m (147.64 ft) tall at the time of completion, and was built to store the translations of Buddhist sutras by Yijing. The massive 1556 Shaanxi earthquake eventually damaged the tower and reduced its height to 43.4 m (142.39 ft).

The Nestorian Stele is a Tang Chinese stele erected in 781 that documents 150 years of early Christianity in China. It is a 279 cm tall limestone block with text in both Chinese and Syriac describing the existence of Christian communities in several cities in northern China. It reveals that the initial Nestorian Christian church had met recognition by the Tang Emperor Taizong, due to efforts of the Christian missionary Alopen in 635.

Chang'an was devastated at the end of the Tang dynasty. In the first years of the 10th century, residents were forced to move to the new capital city in Luoyang. Only a small area of the former city continued to be occupied thereafter.

Under the Song dynasty, Xi'an was an important cultural center of scholarship and innovation on matters such as science, as well as historiography, religion, and philosophy in China. The Northern Song era saw its people, political culture, and strategic location be directly utilized by the Song dynasty proper and its continued relevance to Muslim travelers into China and Chinese Muslim residents.

During the Ming dynasty, a new wall was constructed in 1370 which remains intact to this day. The wall measures 11.9 km (7.4 mi) in circumference, 12 m (39.37 ft) in height, and 15 to 18 m (49.21–59.06 ft) in thickness at the base; a moat was also built outside the walls. The new wall and moat would protect a much smaller city of 12 km^{2} (4.6 sq mi).

=== Modern era ===
The Qing dynasty established a walled off Manchu banner quarter in northeast Xi'an, on the site of the former palace of the Ming Prince of Qin. A Han banner quarter was established in the southeast of the city.

Manchu bannermen from the Xi'an banner garrison were praised for maintaining Manchu culture by Kangxi in 1703. Xi'an garrison Manchus were said to retain Manchu culture far better than all other Manchus at martial skills in the provincial garrisons and they were able to draw their bows properly and perform cavalry archery, unlike Beijing Manchus. The Qianlong emperor received a memorial staying Xi'an Manchu bannermen still had martial skills, although not up to those in the past, in a 1737 memorial from Cimbu. By the 1780s, the military skills of Xi'an Manchu bannermen dropped enormously, and they had been regarded as the most militarily skilled provincial Manchu banner garrison. Manchu women from the Xi'an garrison often left the walled Manchu garrison and went to hot springs outside the city, and gained bad reputations for their sexual lives. A Manchu from Beijing, Sumurji, was shocked and disgusted by this after being appointed Lieutenant general of the Manchu garrison of Xi'an and informed the Yongzheng emperor what they were doing. Han civilians and Manchu bannermen in Xi'an had bad relations, with the bannermen trying to steal at the markets. Manchu Lieutenant general Cimbru reported this to Yongzheng emperor in 1729, after he was assigned there. Governor Yue Rui of Shandong was then ordered by the Yongzheng to report any bannerman misbehaving and warned him not to cover it up in 1730, after Manchu bannermen were put in a quarter in Qingzhou. Manchu bannermen from the garrisons in Xi'an and Jingzhou fought in Xinjiang in the 1770s and Manchus from Xi'an garrison fought in other campaigns against the Dzungars and Uyghurs throughout the 1690s and 18th century. In the 1720s Jingzhou, Hangzhou, and Nanjing Manchu banner garrisons fought in Tibet.

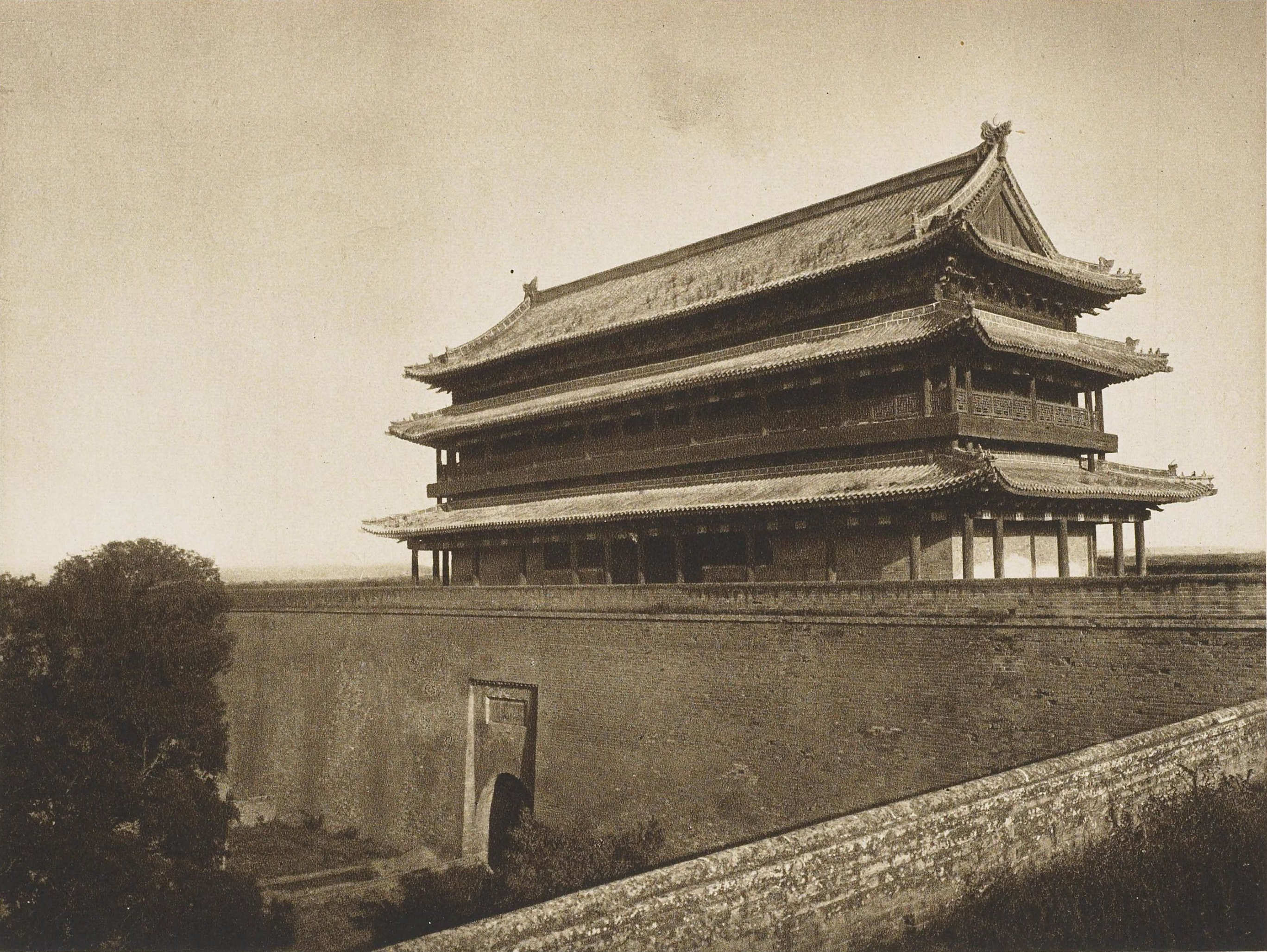
Main tower of Anyuan Gate (North Gate), Xi'an, c. 1906–1909

For the over 200 years they lived next to each other, Han civilians and Manchu bannermen of both genders in Xi'an did not intermarry with each other at all. The Qing dynasty altered its law on intermarriage between Han civilians and Manchu bannermen several times in the dynasty. At the beginning of the Qing dynasty, the Qing allowed Han civilians to marry Manchu women. Then the Qing banned civilians from marrying women from the Eight banners later. In 1865, the Qing allowed Han civilian men to marry Manchu bannerwomen in all garrisons, except the capital garrison of Beijing. There was no formal law on marriage between people in the different banners, like the Manchu and Han banners, but it was informally regulated by social status and custom. In northeastern China, such as Heilongjiang and Liaoning, it was more common for Manchu women to marry Han men, since they were not subjected to the same laws and institutional oversight as Manchus and Han in Beijing and elsewhere.

In October 1911, during the Xinhai revolution, revolutionaries stormed the Manchu fort in Xi'an. Most of the city's 20,000 Manchus were killed. Hui (Muslims; then referred to as "Mohammedans") were divided in its support for the revolution. Those of Shaanxi supported the revolutionaries, while those of Gansu supported the Qing. The Hui of Xi'an (Shaanxi province) joined the Han Chinese revolutionaries in slaughtering the Manchus. Some wealthy Manchus survived by being ransomed. Wealthy Han Chinese enslaved Manchu girls and poor Han Chinese troops seized young Manchu women as wives. Hui Muslims also seized young pretty Manchu girls and raised them as Muslims.

A British missionary who witnessed the massacre commented that "Old and young, men and women, children alike, were all butchered... Houses were plundered and then burnt; those who would fain have laid hidden till the storm was past, were forced to come out into the open. The revolutionaries, protected by a parapet of the wall, poured a heavy, unceasing, relentless fire into the doomed Tartar (Manchu) city, those who tried to escape thence into the Chinese city were cut down as they emerged from the gates."

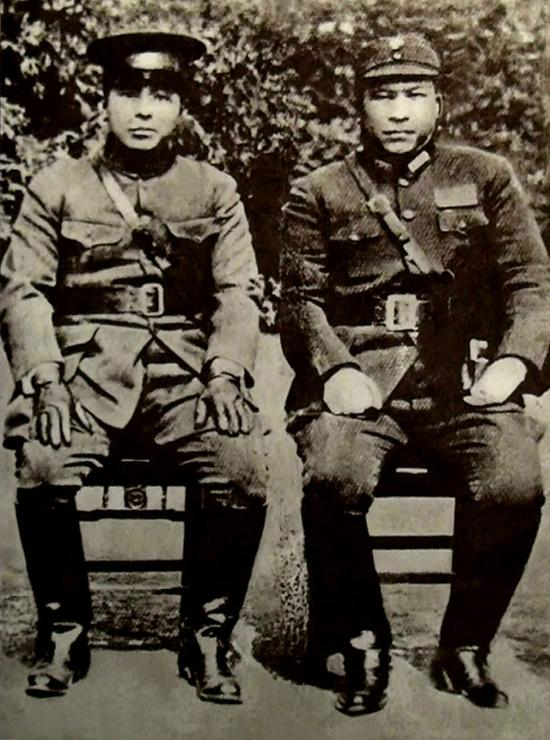
Zhang Xueliang and Yang Hucheng led the Xi'an Incident in 1936, which played a vital role in the modern history of China

In 1936, the Xi'an (then "Sian") Incident took place in the city during the Chinese Civil War. The incident helped to bring the Kuomintang (KMT) and Chinese Communist Party to form the Second United Front in order to concentrate on fighting against the Imperial Japanese Army in the Second Sino-Japanese War.

On March 11, 1938, an aerial battle broke out for the first time over Xi'an as Imperial Japanese Army Air Force aircraft attacked the city, and was engaged by Chinese Air Force I-15 fighter planes, led by Lt. Cen Zeliu of the 5th Pursuit Group, 17th Squadron. While repeatedly attacked by air, Shaanxi was heavily fortified by units of the Eighth Route Army; Xi'an was never taken by the Japanese forces.

On May 20, 1949, the Communist-controlled People's Liberation Army captured the city of Xi'an from the Kuomintang force.

During the Mao era, Xi'an was further developed as part of the Third Front Construction.

Xi'an made headlines for being one of the many cities where the 2012 China anti-Japanese demonstrations occurred.

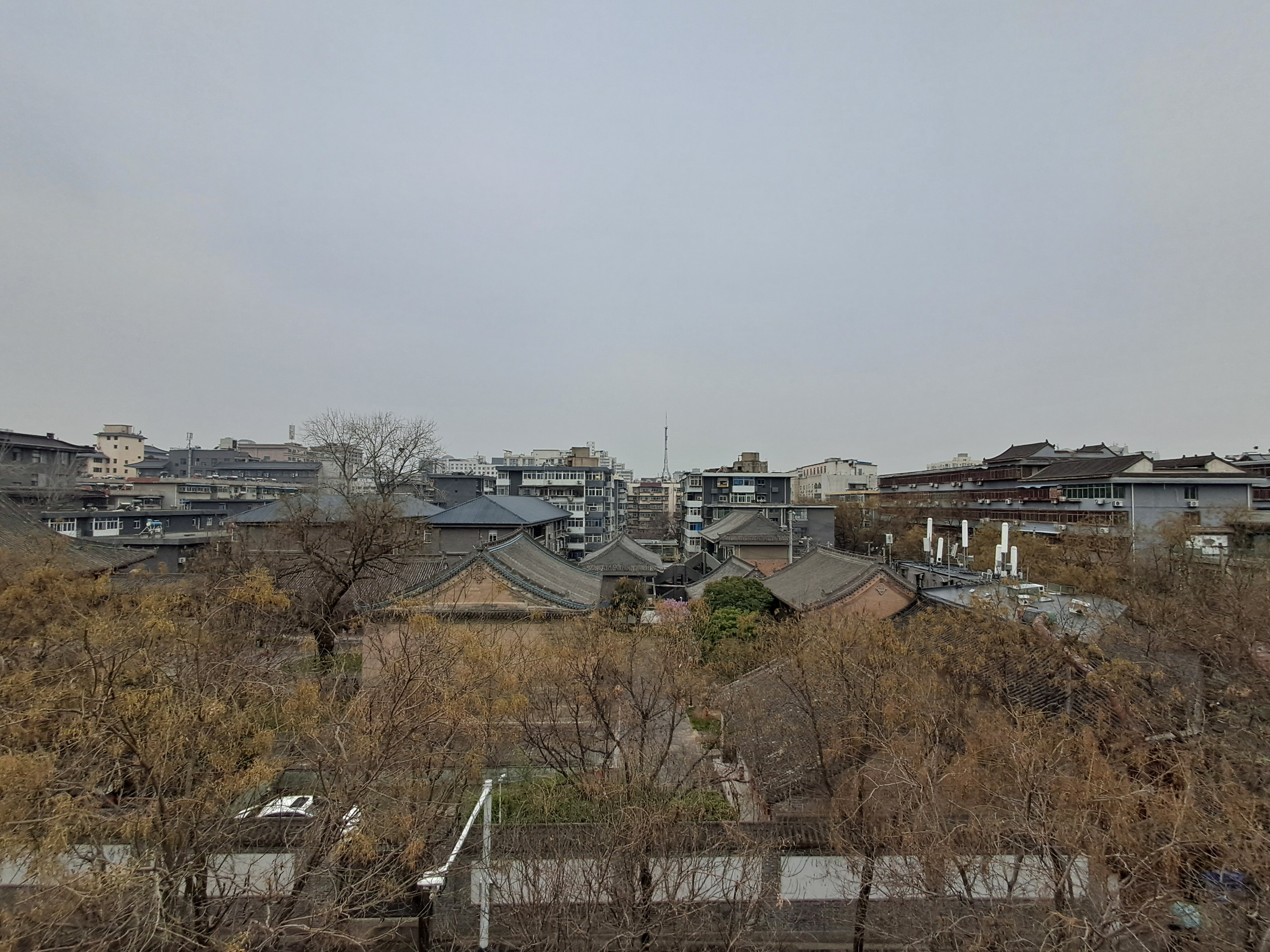
Xi'an from the city walls

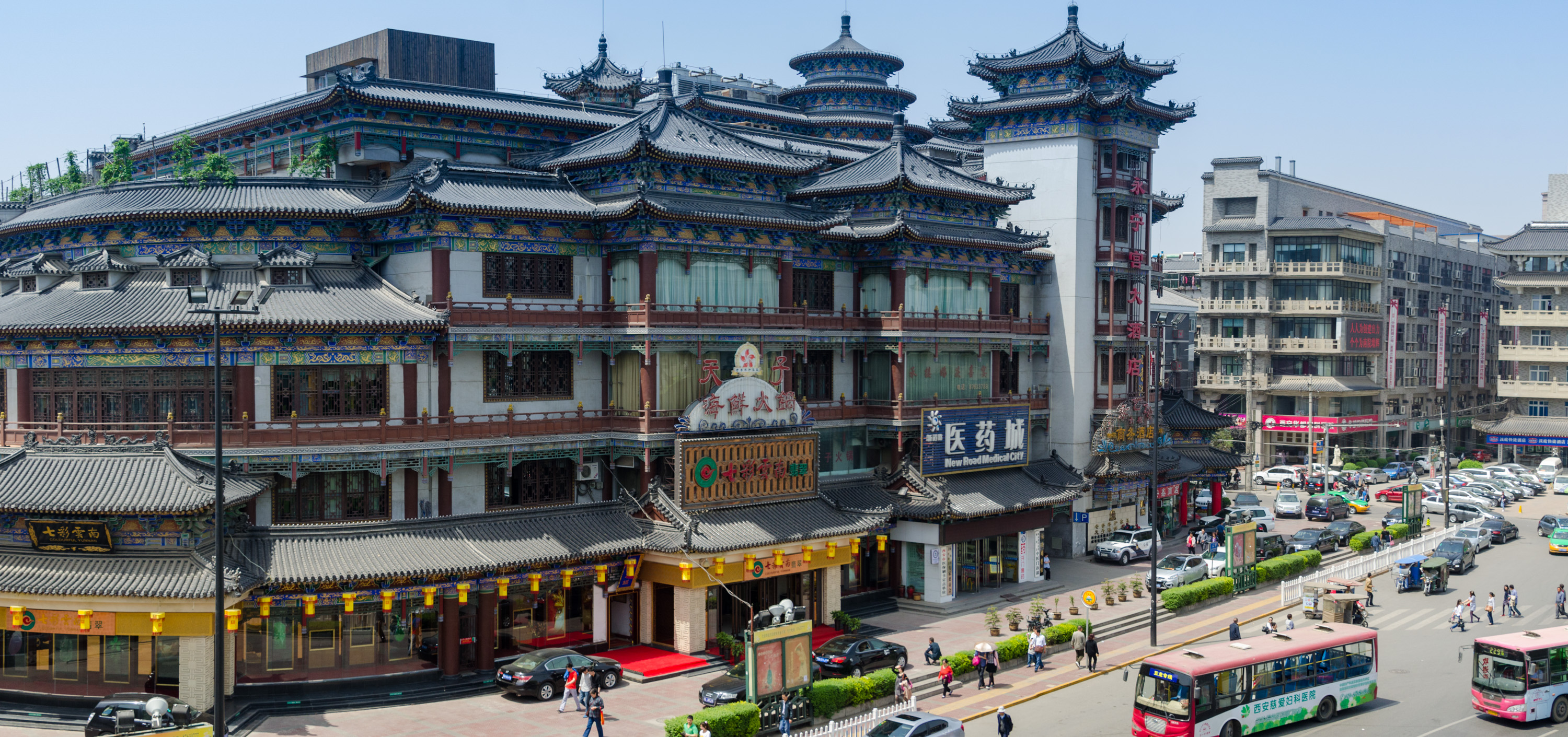
A panorama of modern Xi'an

In 2022, Xi'an witnessed the largest COVID-19 community outbreak since the initial months of the pandemic hit China. From December 23, 2021, the city was put into strict lockdown after local authorities reported more than 250 cases, traced to the Delta variant by authorities. This led to stressed healthcare and delayed or insufficient food deliveries to some part of the city. Restrictions of Xi'an were lifted on January 24.

== Geography ==
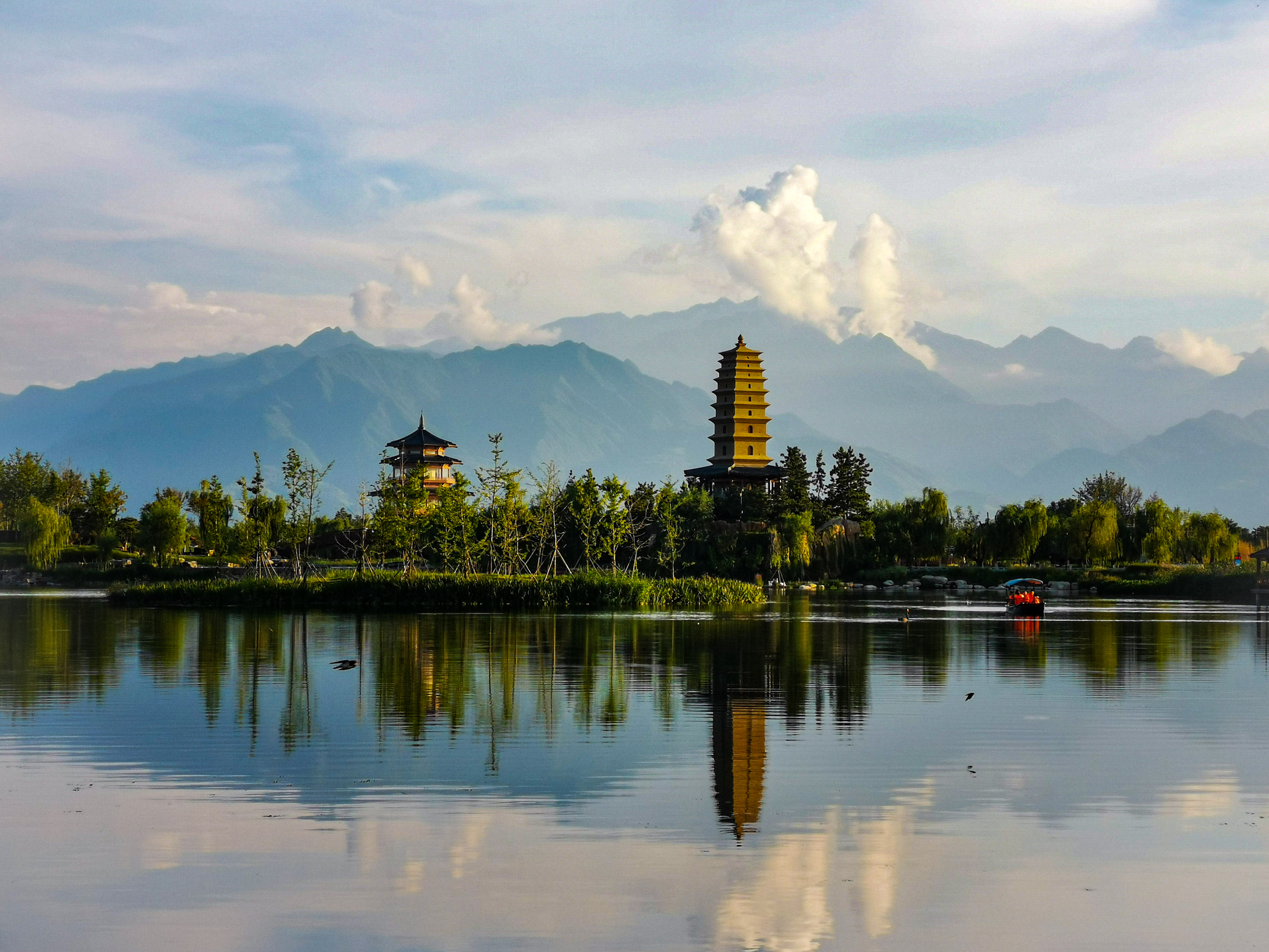
Meibei Lake, Huyi District, Xi'an

Xi'an lies on the Guanzhong Plain in the south-central part of Shaanxi province, on a flood plain created by the eight surrounding rivers and streams.

The city borders the northern foot of the Qin Mountains (Qinling) to the south, and the banks of the Wei River to the north. Hua Shan, one of the five sacred Taoist mountains, is located 100 km (62 mi) away to the east of the city. Not far to the north is the Loess Plateau.

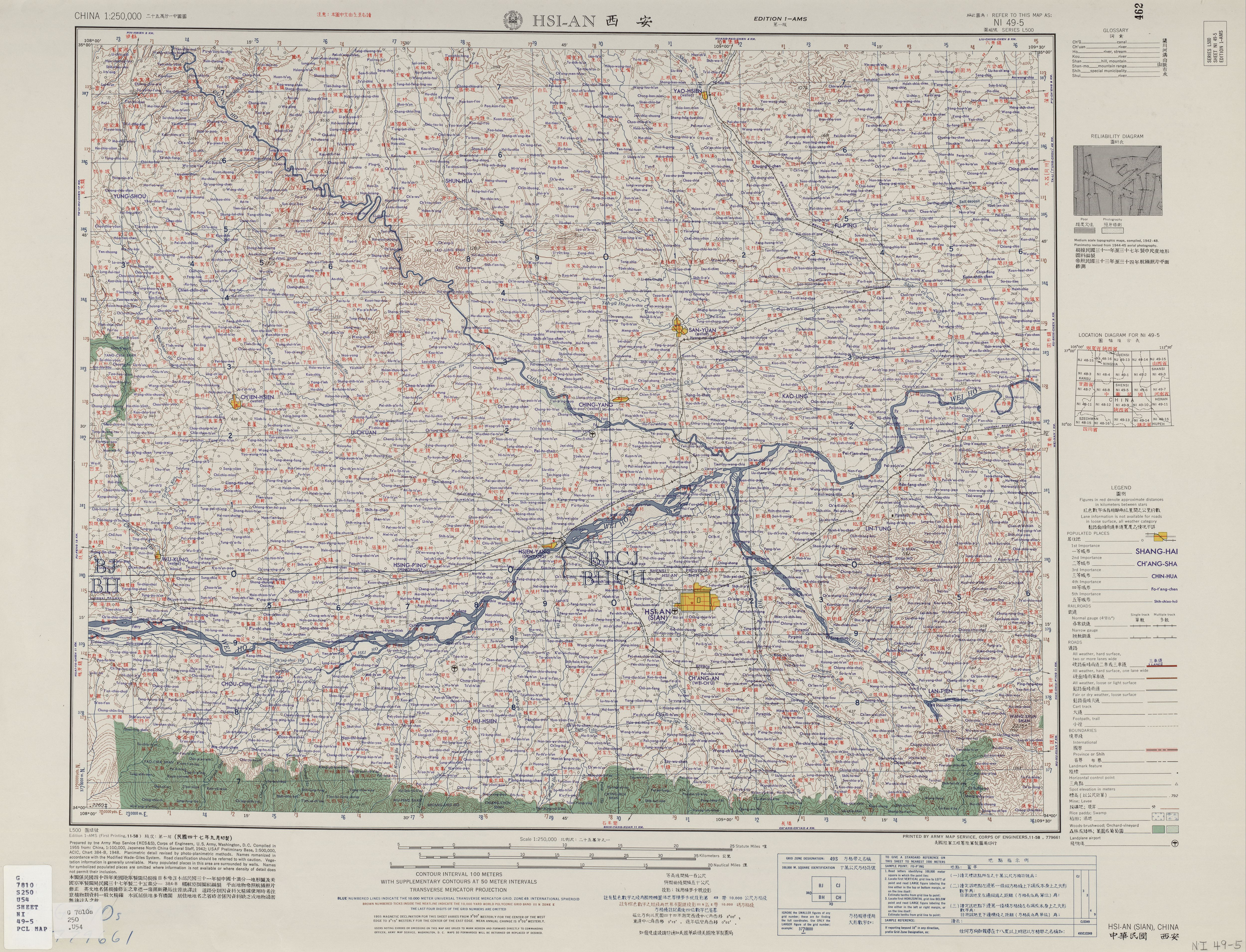
Map including Xi'an (labeled HSI-AN (SIAN) (walled)) (AMS, 1955)

At the beginning of Han dynasty, the Chief of Staff Zhang Liang advised the emperor Liu Bang to choose Guanzhong as the capital of the Han dynasty: "Guanzhong Plain is located behind Mount Xiao and Hangu Pass, and connects Long (Gansu) and Shu (Sichuan). The area can be called an iron castle spreads for thousands of miles, and is rich in harvest like the nation of heaven." (关中左崤函，右陇蜀，沃野千里，此所谓金城千里，天府之国也) Since then, Guanzhong is also known as the 'Nation of the Heaven'.

=== Climate ===
Xi'an has a temperate climate that is influenced by the East Asian monsoon, classified under the Köppen climate classification as a borderline humid subtropical and hot-summer humid continental climate (Cwa/Dwa). The Wei River valley is characterized by hot, humid summers, cold, dry winters, and dry springs and autumns. Most of the annual precipitation is delivered from July to late October. Snow occasionally falls in winter but rarely settles for long. Dust storms often occur during March and April as the city rapidly warms up. Summer months also experience frequent but short thunderstorms. The monthly 24-hour average temperature ranges from around the freezing mark in January to 27.0 °C (80.6 °F) in July, with an annual mean of 14.08 °C (57.3 °F). Extremes since 1951 have ranged from −20.6 °C (−5 °F) on January 11, 1955, to 42.3 °C (108 °F) at the current station in Jinghe on July 15, 2025. A highest record of 42.9 °C (109 °F) was registered in another station on June 17, 2006. An unofficial record low of −25.0 °C (−13 °F) was also recorded in January 1930, but at another weather station in the northern suburbs of the city.

Climate data for Xi'an (Chang'an District), elevation 445 m (1,460 ft), (1991–2020 normals, extremes 1967–present)
Month	Jan	Feb	Mar	Apr	May	Jun	Jul	Aug	Sep	Oct	Nov	Dec	Year
Record high °C (°F)	18.1 (64.6)	26.3 (79.3)	30.8 (87.4)	36.3 (97.3)	39.4 (102.9)	41.8 (107.2)	42.0 (107.6)	41.7 (107.1)	39.3 (102.7)	32.7 (90.9)	26.1 (79.0)	22.6 (72.7)	42.0 (107.6)
Mean daily maximum °C (°F)	5.0 (41.0)	9.3 (48.7)	15.5 (59.9)	22.1 (71.8)	26.9 (80.4)	31.7 (89.1)	32.8 (91.0)	30.7 (87.3)	25.4 (77.7)	19.3 (66.7)	12.6 (54.7)	6.6 (43.9)	19.8 (67.7)
Daily mean °C (°F)	−0.5 (31.1)	3.3 (37.9)	9.0 (48.2)	15.1 (59.2)	20.0 (68.0)	24.9 (76.8)	26.9 (80.4)	25.0 (77.0)	19.9 (67.8)	13.7 (56.7)	6.9 (44.4)	1.1 (34.0)	13.8 (56.8)
Mean daily minimum °C (°F)	−4.4 (24.1)	−1.1 (30.0)	3.9 (39.0)	9.2 (48.6)	13.9 (57.0)	18.7 (65.7)	21.7 (71.1)	20.5 (68.9)	15.8 (60.4)	9.8 (49.6)	2.8 (37.0)	−2.7 (27.1)	9.0 (48.2)
Record low °C (°F)	−17.5 (0.5)	−17.1 (1.2)	−8.4 (16.9)	−2.7 (27.1)	3.0 (37.4)	9.7 (49.5)	14.0 (57.2)	11.4 (52.5)	5.7 (42.3)	−1.9 (28.6)	−13.2 (8.2)	−17.3 (0.9)	−17.5 (0.5)
Average precipitation mm (inches)	8.8 (0.35)	13.3 (0.52)	28.4 (1.12)	49.6 (1.95)	68.0 (2.68)	85.6 (3.37)	103.8 (4.09)	96.7 (3.81)	117.2 (4.61)	66.6 (2.62)	27.9 (1.10)	6.5 (0.26)	672.4 (26.48)
Average precipitation days (≥ 0.1 mm)	4.0	4.7	7.2	7.8	9.8	9.1	10.8	10.4	12.3	11.0	6.1	3.5	96.7
Average snowy days	4.7	3.7	1.3	0.1	0.1	0	0	0	0	0	1.3	2.8	14
Average relative humidity (%)	67	67	65	66	66	63	70	76	80	80	77	69	71
Mean monthly sunshine hours	120.2	121.4	160.2	185.1	200.1	201.2	209.3	176.1	135.2	119.8	120.6	121.7	1,870.9
Percentage possible sunshine	38	39	43	47	46	47	48	43	37	35	39	40	42
Source: China Meteorological Administration all-time extreme temperature

Climate data for Xi'an (Jinghe Station), elevation 410 m (1,350 ft), (2015–2024 normals)
Month	Jan	Feb	Mar	Apr	May	Jun	Jul	Aug	Sep	Oct	Nov	Dec	Year
Mean daily maximum °C (°F)	6.3 (43.3)	10.4 (50.7)	17.7 (63.9)	23.1 (73.6)	27.8 (82.0)	32.2 (90.0)	33.3 (91.9)	32.4 (90.3)	27.0 (80.6)	19.3 (66.7)	13.4 (56.1)	7.5 (45.5)	20.9 (69.6)
Daily mean °C (°F)	1.6 (34.9)	5.0 (41.0)	12.1 (53.8)	17.1 (62.8)	21.6 (70.9)	26.3 (79.3)	27.9 (82.2)	27.2 (81.0)	22.1 (71.8)	14.7 (58.5)	8.8 (47.8)	2.8 (37.0)	15.6 (60.1)
Mean daily minimum °C (°F)	−2.0 (28.4)	0.9 (33.6)	7.6 (45.7)	12.1 (53.8)	16.5 (61.7)	21.2 (70.2)	23.6 (74.5)	23.3 (73.9)	18.4 (65.1)	11.4 (52.5)	5.4 (41.7)	−0.8 (30.6)	11.5 (52.6)
Average precipitation mm (inches)	8.8 (0.35)	13.3 (0.52)	28.4 (1.12)	49.6 (1.95)	68.0 (2.68)	85.6 (3.37)	103.8 (4.09)	96.7 (3.81)	117.2 (4.61)	66.6 (2.62)	27.9 (1.10)	6.5 (0.26)	672.4 (26.48)
Average precipitation days (≥ 0.1 mm)	4.0	4.7	7.2	7.8	9.8	9.1	10.8	10.4	12.3	11.0	6.1	3.5	96.7
Average snowy days	4.7	3.7	1.3	0.1	0.1	0	0	0	0	0	1.3	2.8	14
Average relative humidity (%)	67	67	65	66	66	63	70	76	80	80	77	69	71
Mean monthly sunshine hours	120.2	121.4	160.2	185.1	200.1	201.2	209.3	176.1	135.2	119.8	120.6	121.7	1,870.9
Percentage possible sunshine	38	39	43	47	46	47	48	43	37	35	39	40	42
Source: China Meteorological Administration all-time extreme temperature

=== National Time Service Center ===
The Shaanxi Astronomical Observatory was established in 1966. In 1975, according to the Geodetic Origin Report of the People's Republic of China, 'in order to avoid bias in the mensuration as much as possible, the Geodetic Origin would be in central mainland China.' Lintong (临潼), a town near Xi'an was chosen. Since 1986, Chinese Standard Time (CST) was set from NTSC. The National Time Service Center (NTSC), the Chinese Academy of Sciences is an institute which is mainly engaged in the service and research on time and frequency. NTSC takes charge of generating and maintaining the national standard time scale, disseminating the time and frequency signals. The autonomous standard time scales of universal time and atomic time and the dissemination techniques with LF radio and HF radio were established successively during the 1970s and 1980s, which meet all the requirements for different applications on the whole, such as the scientific researches, national economy, etc.

== Demographics ==
According to the Seventh National Census in 2020, the city's Permanent Population (hukou) was 12,952,907. The proportion of males is 51.07% and that of females is 48.93%. In terms of age structure, the proportion of 0–14 years old is 15.65%, that of 15–59 years old is 68.33%, that of over 60 years old is 16.02%, and that of over 65 years old is 10.9%.

The Xi'an metropolitan area was estimated by the OECD (Organisation for Economic Co-operation and Development) to have, as of 2010, a population of 12.9 million, of which 5,740,000 is urban.

Breakdown of Xi'an population by district and county
Division	Permanent residents			Hukou residents
Division	Total	Percentage	Population density (persons/km^{2})	Hukou residents
Xi'an City	12,952,907	100	838.66	7,827,260
Xincheng District	644,702	4.98	19,574.51	503,641
Beilin District	756,840	5.84	26,298.54	732,494
Lianhu District	1,019,102	7.87	18,226.61	640,911
Baqiao District	593,962	4.59	1,833.97	508,535
Weiyang District	833,403	5.66	3,051.39	516,968
Yanta District	1,202,038	9.28	7,782.38	793,103
Yanliang District	281,536	2.17	1,139.26	252,449
Lintong District	675,961	5.22	716.04	697,586
Chang'an District	1,090,600	8.42	681.94	980,803
Gaoling District	416,996	3.22	1,169.98	294,507
Huyi District	459,417	3.55	434.87	597,071
Lantian County	491,975	3.80	256.25	643,605
Zhouzhi County	504,144	3.89	191.08	665,587
Xixian New District	1,304,618	10.07		
High-tech Industrial Development District	958,333	7.40		
Economic and Technological Development District	550,411	4.25		
Qujiang New District	399,872	3.09		
Aviation industry base District	21,748	0.17		
Aerospace industry base District	161,304	1.25		
Chanba Ecological District	550,015	4.25		
International Port Area	135,930	1.05		

== Administrative divisions ==
Xi'an has direct jurisdiction over 11 districts and 2 counties:

Map
Division code	English	Chinese	Pinyin	Area in km2	Seat	Postal code	Subdivisions			
Division code	English	Chinese	Pinyin	Area in km2	Seat	Postal code	Subdistricts	Towns	Residential communities	Villages
610100	Xi'an	西安市	Xī'ān Shì	10,096.81	Weiyang District	710000	113	55	766	2984
610102	Xincheng District	新城区	Xīnchéng Qū	30.13	Xiyi Road Subdistrict (西一路街道)	710000	9		105	
610103	Beilin District	碑林区	Bēilín Qū	23.37	Zhangjiacun Subdistrict (张家村街道)	710000	8		100	
610104	Lianhu District	莲湖区	Liánhú Qū	38.32	Beiyuanmen Subdistrict (北院门街道)	710000	9		127	5
610111	Baqiao District	灞桥区	Bàqiáo Qū	324.50	Fangzhicheng Subdistrict (纺织城街道)	710000	9		40	223
610112	Weiyang District	未央区	Wèiyāng Qū	264.41	Zhangjiabao Subdistrict (张家堡街道)	710000	12		114	147
610113	Yanta District	雁塔区	Yàntǎ Qū	151.45	Xiaozhai Road Subdistrict (小寨路街道)	710000	8		123	84
610114	Yanliang District	阎良区	Yánliáng Qū	244.55	Fenghuang Road Subdistrict (凤凰路街道)	710089	5	2	23	80
610115	Lintong District	临潼区	Líntóng Qū	915.97	Lishan Subdistrict (骊山街道)	710600	23		36	284
610116	Chang'an District	长安区	Cháng'ān Qū	1,588.53	Weiqu Subdistrict (韦曲街道)	710100	25		47	659
610117	Gaoling District	高陵区	Gāolíng Qū	285.03	Luyuan Subdistrict (鹿苑街道)	710200	3	3	8	88
610118	Huyi District	鄠邑区	Hùyì Qū	1,279.42	Ganting Subdistrict (甘亭街道)	710300	1	13	21	518
610122	Lantian County	蓝田县	Lántián Xiàn	2,005.95	Languan Subdistrict (蓝关街道)	710500	1	18	8	520
610124	Zhouzhi County	周至县	Zhōuzhì Xiàn	2,945.20	Erqu Subdistrict (二曲街道)	710400	1	19	14	376

== Transportation ==
Xi'an has many areas that are easily accessible on foot. In many commercial, residential, educational zones in the city, especially in the shopping and entertainment districts around the Bell Tower, underpasses and overpasses have been built for the safety and convenience of pedestrians.

A bicycle sharing network started operating in Xi'an from the year 2013 and today has 52,000 bikes, used by over 200,000 people per day. Taxi services are numerous, but many citizens of Xi'an still commute to work using the city's 270 official municipal bus routes. The routes are serviced by a fleet of over 7,800 buses, with an average system-wide ridership of over 4 million people per day. The bus network is complemented by a rapidly expanding subway system that carries over 1.5 million commuters per day. There are more than 2 million registered automobiles in Xi'an; the growing number of personal automobiles also means traffic jams are a common urban issue.

=== Metro ===
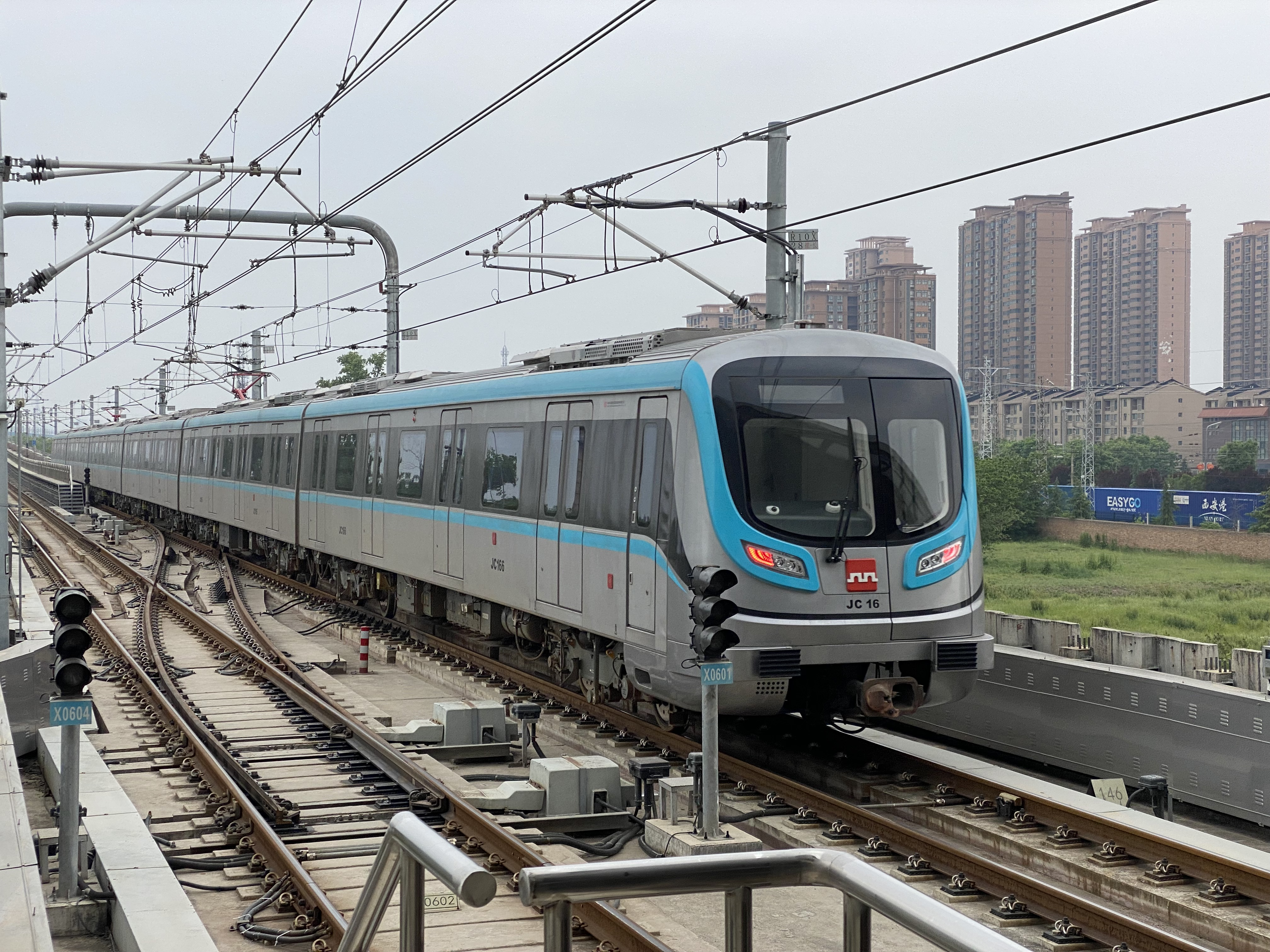
Xi'an Metro Line 14

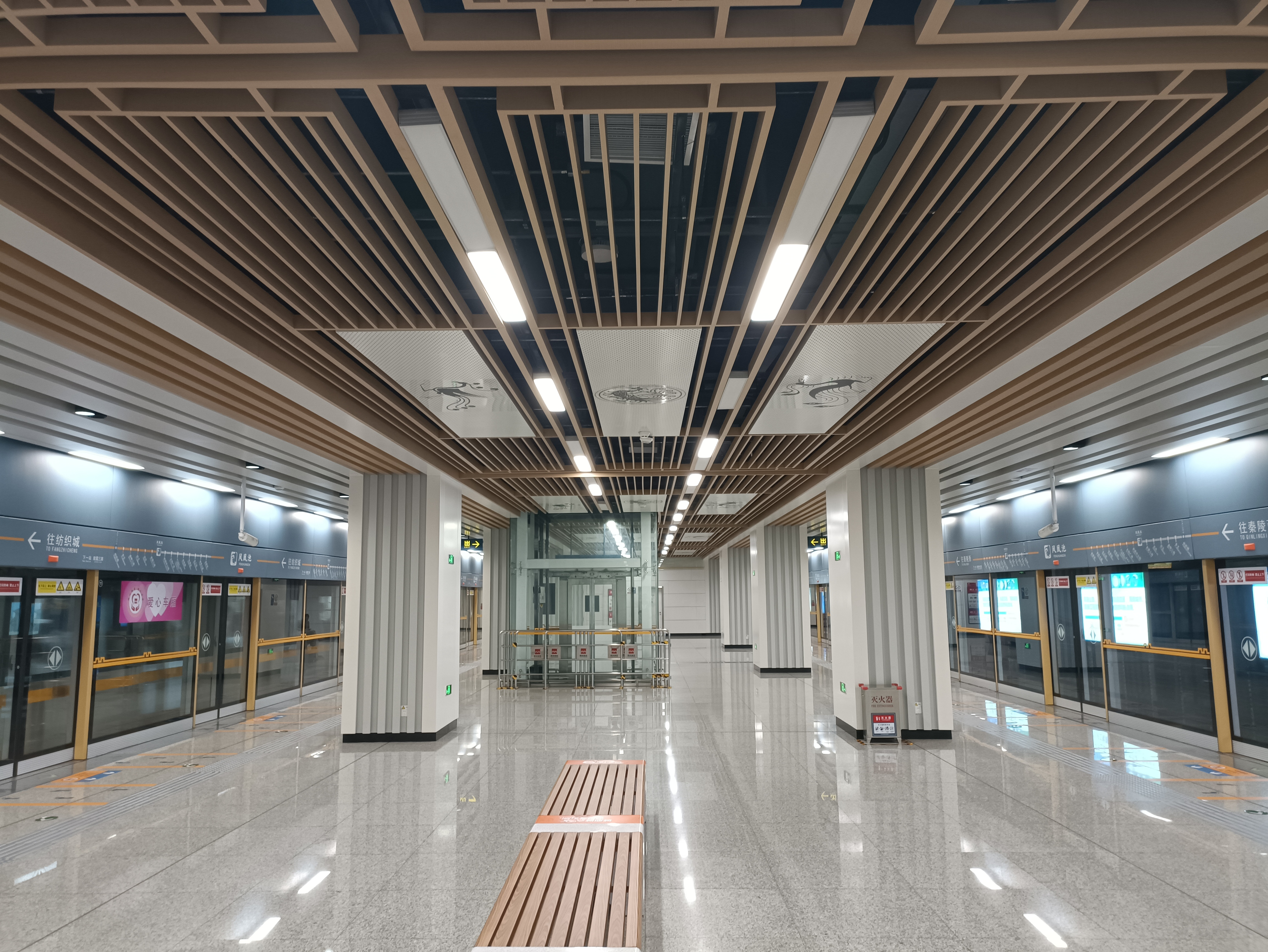
Fenghuangchi station

Line 2, running through the city from north (North Railway Station) to south (Weiqu Nan), was the first line opened to the public on September 16, 2011. Operations began on September 28, 2011. This line is 19.9 kilometers (12.4 miles) long with 17 stations. Line 1 opened on September 15, 2013. As a west–east railway, its 19 stations connect Houweizhai and Fangzhicheng. Line 3 runs from northeast (Baoshuiqu) to southwest (Yuhuazhai) and opened on November 8, 2016. Line 4, which is basically parallel to Line 2 on its east except for the northern parts, runs from the North Square of the North Railway Station [Beikezhan (Beiguangchang)] to south (Hangtianxincheng) and was available publicly on December 26, 2018. Line 5 opened on December 28, 2020. This line is 41.6 kilometers long, with 31 stations from Matengkong to Chuangxingang.

Line 16 opened on June 27, 2023, and is 15.03 kilometers long, and runs from Qinchuangyuanzhongxin to Shijingli with 9 stations. Four more lines are currently under construction, including an extension of Line 1.

The subway system covers some of the most famous attractions, such as Banpo Museum (Banpo Station, Line 1), Bell and Drum Tower (Line 2), Fortifications of Xi'an (Line 2), the Giant Wild Goose Pagoda (Line 3 and Line 4), the Daminggong National Heritage Park (Line 4) and Shaanxi History Museum (Line 2, 3 and 4), etc.

The first metro departure time for Line 1, 2, 3 and 4 is 6:00, the last metro departure time for Line 3 and 4 is 23:00, for Line 1 is 23:30, and for Line 2 is 23:50.

On December 30, 2008, a fire accident occurred that was extinguished within an hour and all workers evacuated safely. Sixty-six hours later, on January 2, another fire occurred at another station on Line 2.

=== Rail ===
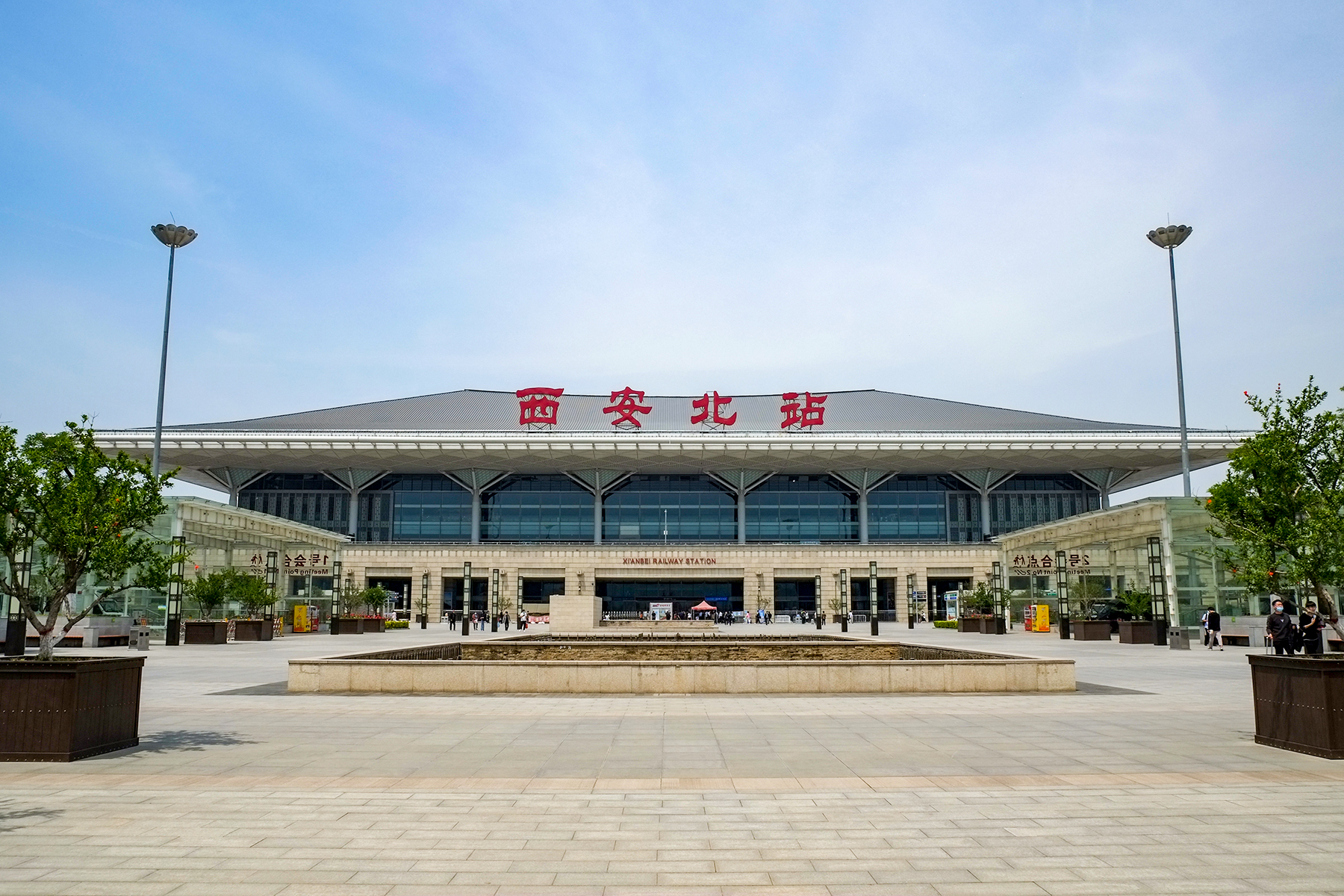
Xi'an North railway station

Xi'an North railway station, situated a few miles to the north of the city centre, is the station for the high-speed trains of the Zhengzhou–Xi'an High-Speed Railway, part of the Xuzhou–Lanzhou high-speed railway. Construction work on the Zhengzhou–Xi'an High-Speed Railway began on September 25, 2005, the railway opened for service on February 6, 2010. The railway made air service between Zhengzhou and Xi'an uncompetitive. All passenger flights between the two cities were suspended within 48 days of start of regular high-speed rail service. With 34 platforms, Xi'an North was the largest railway station in Northwest China when it was opened. Construction of the station began on September 19, 2008. The station was opened on January 11, 2011. It is also served by the Datong–Xi'an high-speed railway, which connects to Beijing North, the Xi'an–Chengdu high-speed railway and the Yinchuan–Xi'an high-speed railway.

Xi'an railway station is located just north of Xi'an's walled city and is the main hub of conventional rail services in Shaanxi Province. It covers 597,000 square meters (6,430,000 square feet), has 6 passenger platforms and 11 passenger tracks. It provides 112 services to 80 000 people daily. Among the destinations served by direct trains from Xi'an are Beijing, Zhengzhou, Lanzhou, Baoji, and Mount Hua.

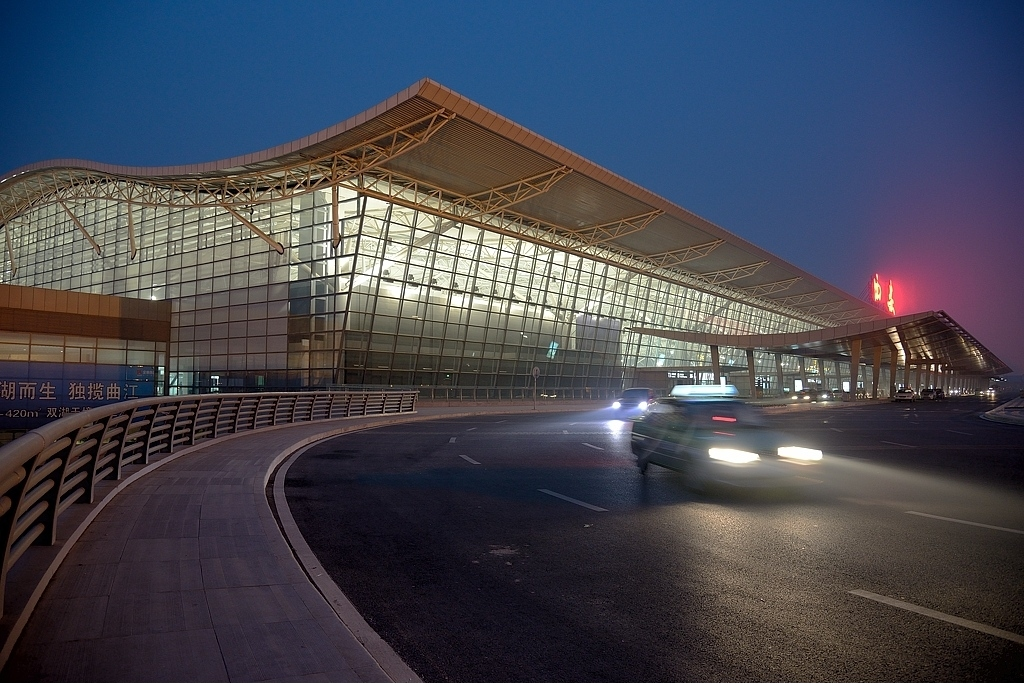
Xi'an Xianyang International Airport

Xi'an East and Xi'an South are large stations now under construction to serve new high-speed lines being built, such as the Xi'an–Chongqing HSR and the Wuhan–Xi'an HSR.

The city's other stations include Xi'an West, Yinzhen, Sanmincun, and Fangzhicheng.

=== Air ===
Xi'an Xianyang International Airport (airport code: XIY) is the major airport serving the city and it is the largest airport in the northwestern part of China. It is 25 miles northwest of Xi'an city center, and 8 miles northeast of the center of Xianyang. China Eastern Airlines, Hainan Airlines and China Southern Airlines are the main airlines using the airport. Terminal 3 and the second runway were opened on May 3, 2012. Construction of Terminal 5 began in 2022 and was completed in September 2024.

Other than linking to most Chinese cities, the airport also has flights to several major international destinations, including Tokyo, Seoul, London, Paris and Sydney.

== Culture and religion ==
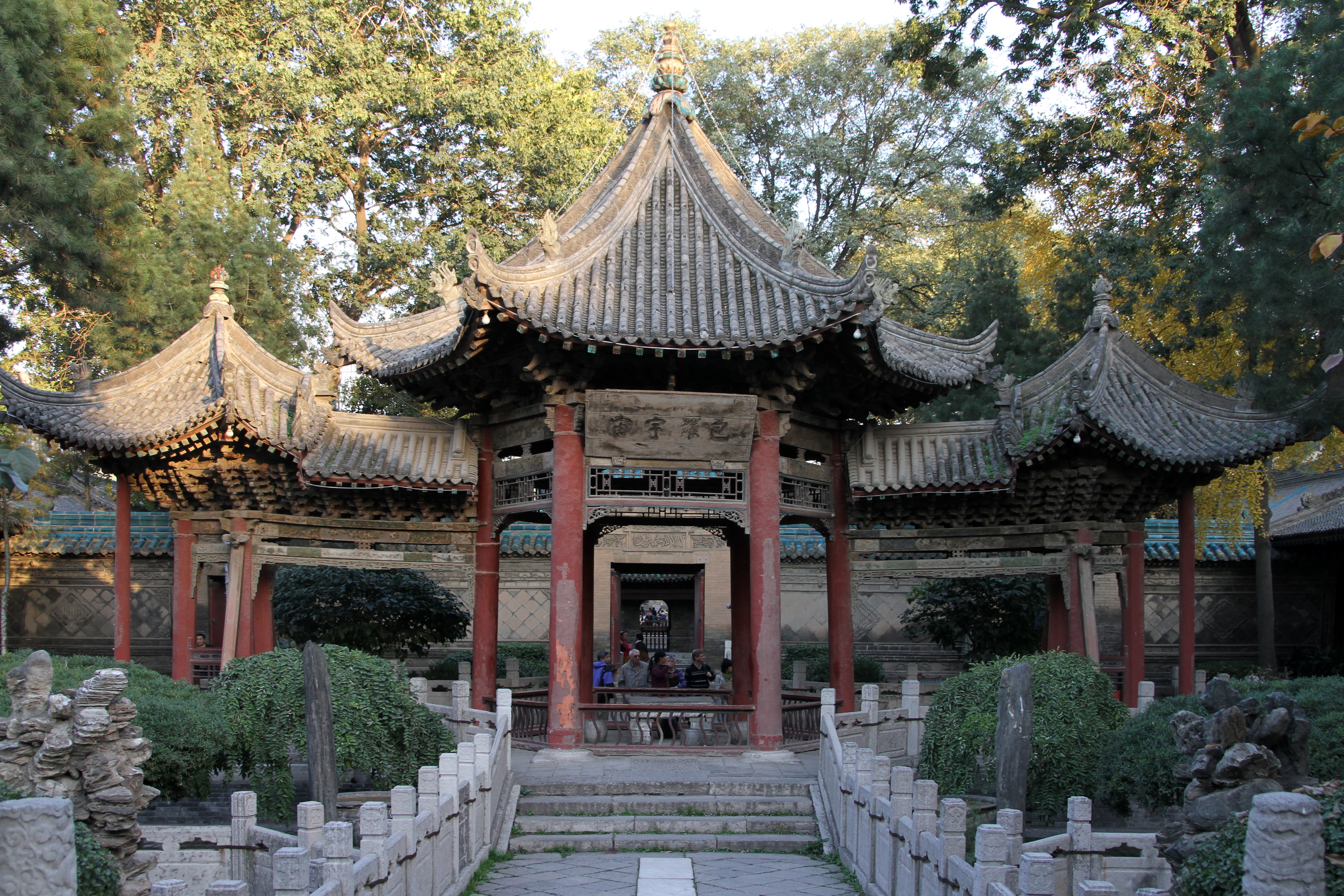
A typical Chinese pavilion located in Xi'an

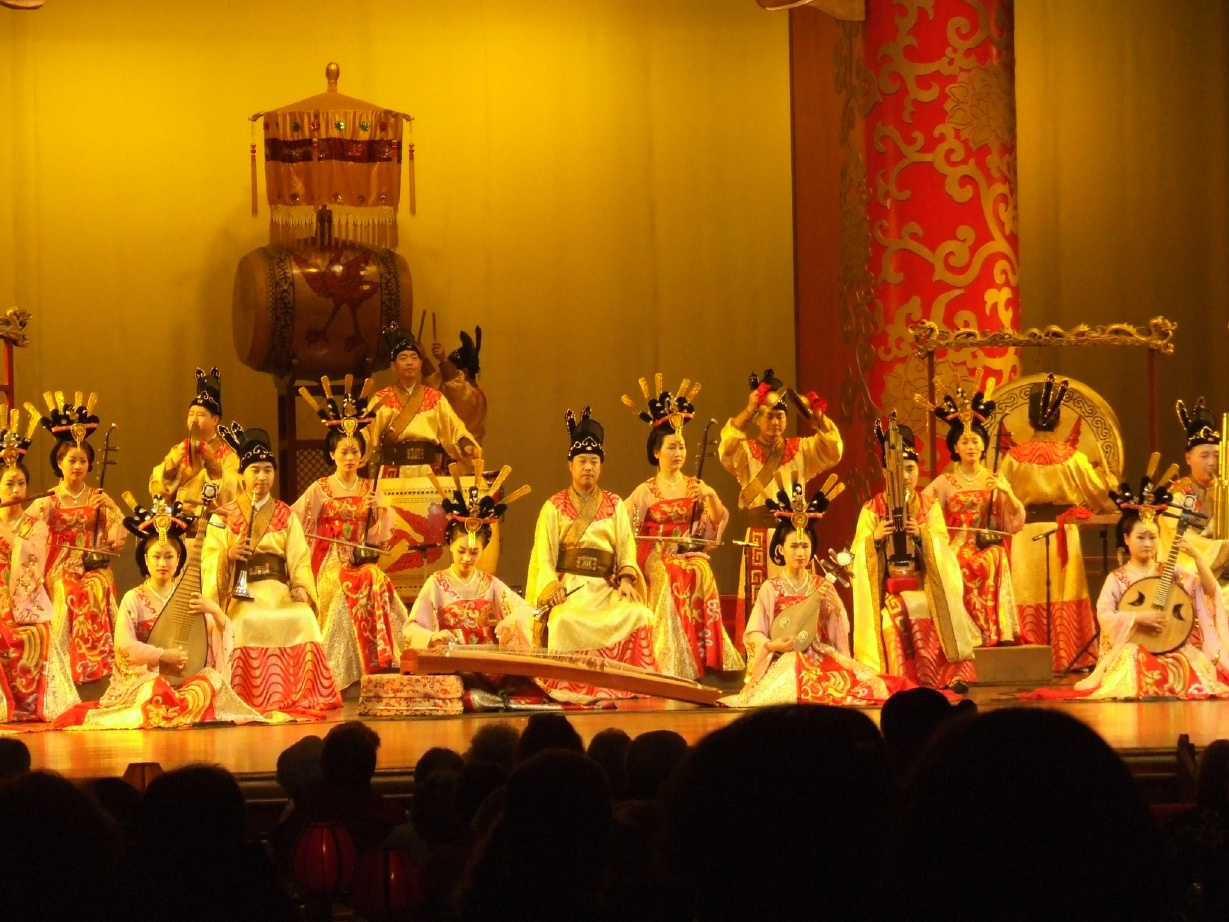
Traditional Chinese musical performances at Xi'an

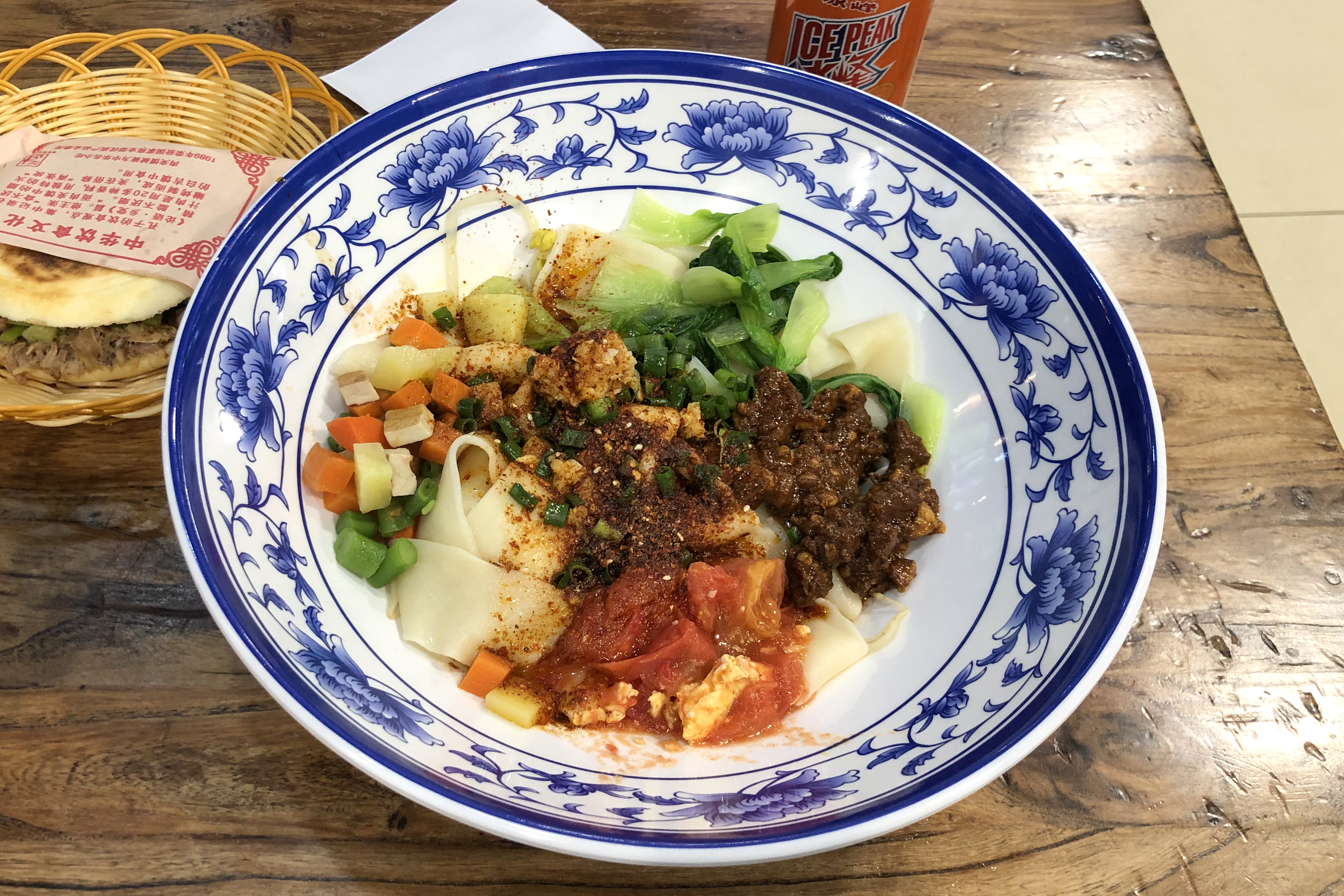
Biang Biang Noodles

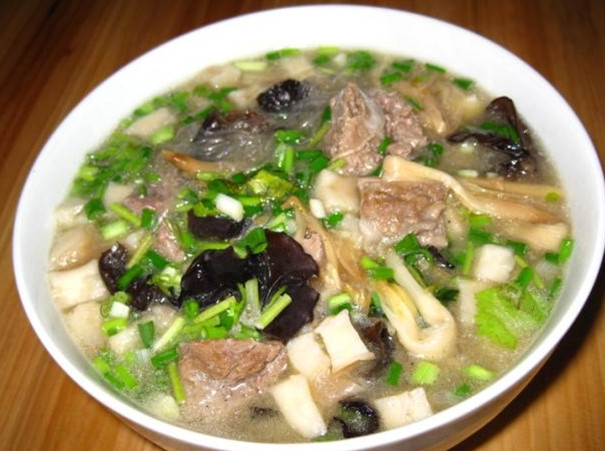
Lamb paomo

=== Resident artists ===
Xi'an is home to contemporary Chinese stars such as Xu Wei, Zhang Chu and Zheng Jun.

=== Xi'an cuisine ===
Yangrou paomo (flat bread soaked in lamb soup; simplified Chinese: 羊肉泡馍; traditional Chinese: 羊肉泡饃; pinyin: Yángròu pàomó) is a well known Xi'anese dish.

Liang pi (cold rice noodles; simplified Chinese: 凉皮; traditional Chinese: 涼皮; pinyin: liángpí) are wheat or rice noodles served cold with vinegar and chili oil.

Biangbiang mian, also known as youpo chemian (simplified Chinese: 油泼扯面; traditional Chinese: 油潑扯麵; pinyin: Yóupō chěmiàn), are thick and long hand-pulled noodles, typically served with red hot pepper.

Roujiamo (meat buns; simplified Chinese: 肉夾馍; traditional Chinese: 肉夾饃; pinyin: Ròujiāmó) is a bun filled with pork.

=== Qinqiang ===
Qinqiang (Voice of Qin) is the oldest and most extensive of the four major types of Chinese opera. Another one would be the Empress of the Great Tang is China's first Tang dynasty dance and music show. The story is based on the life of the famous Chinese historical figure Empress Wu Zetian of the Tang dynasty. Through live performances by a classical Chinese orchestra and state-of-the-art stage design, this show will take you back to the glory of the legendary Empress Wu Zetian and the Great Tang Empire.

=== Chinese traditional religion and Taoism ===
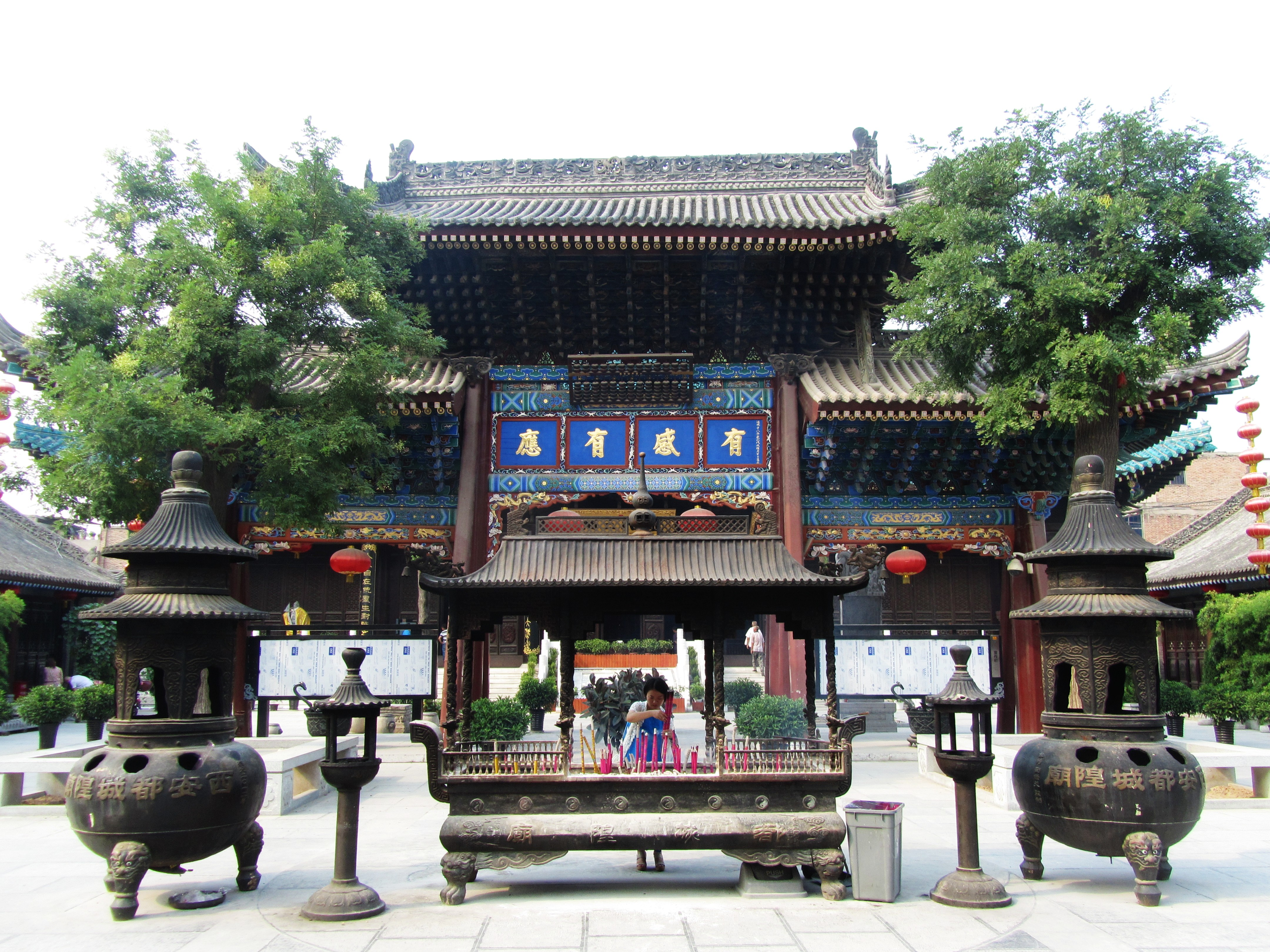
A pavilion of the City God Temple of Xi'an

The most influential religions in Xi'an are the Chinese traditional religion and Taoist schools, represented by many major and minor temples. Among these there are a City God Temple, completely reconstructed in the 2010s, and a Temple of Confucius.

=== Christianity ===
The first recorded Christian missionary in China was Alopen, a Syriac-speaker, who arrived in Xi'an (then known as Chang'an) in 635 along the Silk Road. The Nestorian Stele, now located in Xi'an's Beilin Museum, is a Tang Chinese stele erected in 781 that documents the 150 years of early Christianity in China following Alopen. It is a 279-centimeter-tall (110-inch) limestone block with text in both Chinese and Syriac describing the existence of Christian communities in several cities in northern China. The Daqin Pagoda, a Buddhist pagoda in Zhouzhi County of Xi'an, has been suggested to have originally been a Nestorian Christian church from the Tang dynasty.

Baptist missionaries from England ran a hospital in Xi'an. In 1892, Arthur Gostick Shorrock and Moir Duncan founded the Sianfu Mission, in present-day Xi'an.

=== Islam ===
Xi'an has a Muslim community made up of people from the Hui ethnic group. There are an estimated 50,000 Hui Muslims in Xi'an. There are seven mosques in Xi'an, the best known being the Great Mosque. The Great Mosque, located in the city center, is one of the oldest and most significant mosques in China. It was built during the Tang Dynasty and has been renovated and expanded over the centuries. The mosque reflects a unique blend of Islamic and traditional Chinese architectural styles.

=== Public archaeology ===
The Shaanxi Provincial Cultural Heritage Administration has initiated "Archaeology Live" programs at several active excavation sites within the city, such as the Hanjing Site. These programs allow the public to observe archaeological work in progress and learn about conservation methods, representing a significant step in public outreach for Chinese archaeology.

== Economy ==
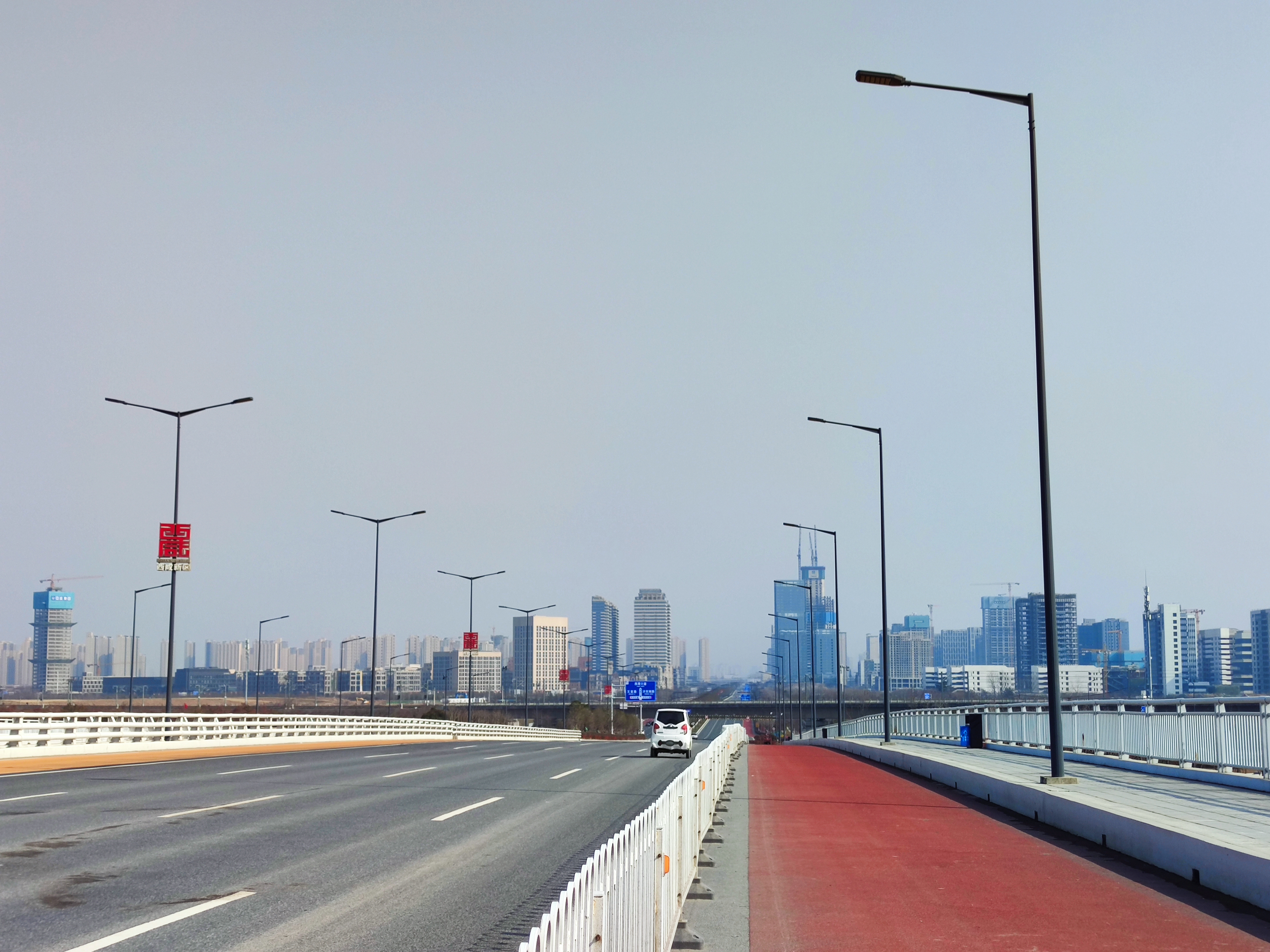
Fenghe Bridge

As part of the China Western Development policy, Xi'an became a major target for accelerated attention, particularly in information technology, advanced materials, aerospace, energy, and chemical engineering. From 1997 to 2006, the industrial output value of Xi'an's service industry increased at an annual average rate of 13 percent, compared to traditional service industries of 0.74 percent, representing a growth from US$8.113 billion to US$25.85 billion.

In 2020, Xi'an was ranked as a Beta- (global second tier) city by the Globalization and World Cities Research Network. Xi'an was ranked in 2020 as one of the world's top 100 financial centers, according to the Global Financial Centres Index.

Important industries include equipment manufacturing, tourism, and service outsourcing. The manufacturing industry had an annual output of RMB 36.5 billion, accounting for 44.5 percent of the city's total. Furthermore, as one of China's four ancient capitals, Xi'an's many cultural sites, including the Terracotta Army, the City Wall of Xi'an, and the Famen Temple, make tourism an important industry as well. In 2019, tourists visiting Xi'an exceeded 300 million, earning a total income of RMB 314.6 billion. On average, revenue increases by 36.4 percent per year, and foreign-exchange earnings (530 million in 2009) increase by around 35.8 percent.

Xi'an is also one of the first service outsourcing cities in China, with over 800 corporations in the industry. The city's output value from this sector exceeded RMB 23 billion in 2008. Employment in the sector doubled from 1997 to 2006, from a base of 60,000, and computer consulting also doubled from 16,000 to 32,000. As a result of the importance of the software-outsourcing industry, the city planned construction of a Software New Town, which is scheduled to be completed in 2015 with 30 billion RMB investment. Other major export goods include lighting equipment and automobile parts, while its major import goods are mechanical and electrical products. Internationally, Xi'an's largest trade partner is the United States.

The Xi'an International Trade and Logistics Park covers about thirty-five square miles and was conceived of as model for logistics-based urbanization. The park is a major dry port and rail container center. More China-Europe Freight Train (CEFT) rails depart from or return to Xi'an than any other city.

=== Software and technological industries ===
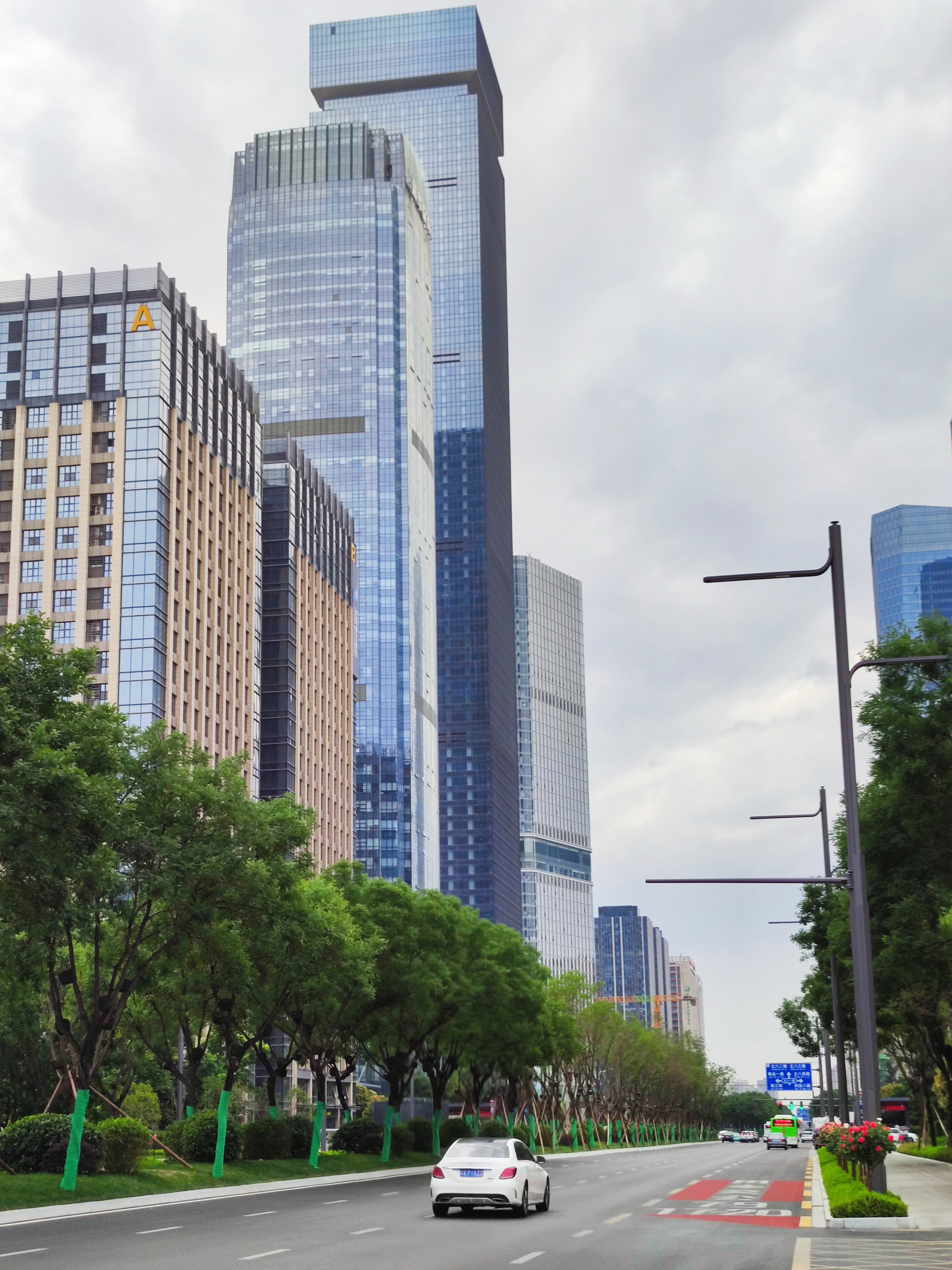
Xi'an Hi-Tech Industries Development Zone

The major industrial zone in Xi'an is the Xi'an Economic and Technological Development Zone. The Jiangcungou landfill in Xi'an was China's largest landfill site before its closure in 2019.

The growing economy of the city also supports the development of a software industry, and the city is a pioneer in software industry in China. The Xi'an Software Park within the Xi'an Hi-Tech Industries Development Zone (XDZ) has attracted over 1,085 corporations and 106,000 employees as of 2012. Xi'an is described as having" large pool of cheap human resources from the 100 universities in the area, it hoovers up around 3,000 computer graduates every year, each earning approximately $120 a month—half the wages for the equivalent job in Beijing."

=== Aerospace industry ===
In November 2006, Xi'an and the China Aerospace Science and Technology Corporation jointly set up Xi'an Aerospace Science and Technology Industrial Base. From its establishment, the base has focused on the development of the civil space industry, including equipment manufacturing, software and service outsourcing, new materials and solar photovoltaics.

Apart from the core area, the base will cover Xi'an and the Guanzhong area and the expansion zone will reach other parts of Northwest China and Southwest China. It is expected that by 2012 the total industry output can reach 2.8 billion us dollars with about 10 to 20 brand products with intellectual property rights and 5 to 8 products with global competitiveness.

In 2008, after the launch of the initial aerospace center in Shanghai, the PRC is constructing another civil aerospace center in the Shaanxi province. The State Development and Reform Commission approved the planning of Xi'an National Civil Aerospace Industrial Base on December 26, 2007. The National Civil Aerospace Industrial Base of Xi'an, set to cover 23 km^{2} (8.9 sq mi), will focus on developing satellites, new materials, energies, IT and other technologies for civil applications.

== Education and research ==
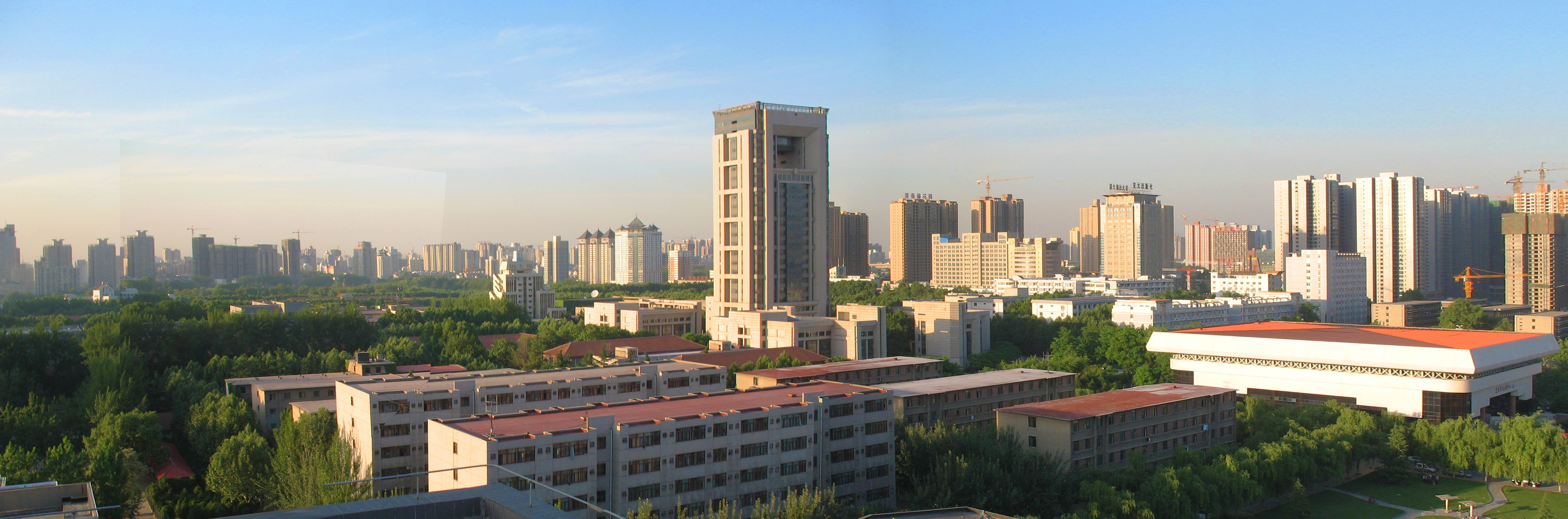
Xi'an Jiaotong University

Xi'an has many highly ranked educational institutions, with the seven universities listed in 147 National Key Universities under the Double First-Class Construction ranking fourth nationwide (tie) with Guangzhou, Wuhan and Chengdu (only after Beijing, Shanghai and Nanjing). There are a total of 60 universities in the city, with the two famous ones being the Xi'an Jiaotong University (西安交通大学) and the Northwestern Polytechnical University (西北工业大学), which were ranked #79 and #151 worldwide, respectively. Other ones also include Xidian University (西安电子科技大学), Chang'an University (长安大学), Northwest University (西北大学), Northwest University of Political Science and Law (西北政法大学) and; Shaanxi Normal University (陕西师范大学).

The city was ranked 113th globally by the QS Best Student Cities Rankings in 2026.

Xi'an is a world leading city for scientific research and as of 2023, it ranked among the world's top 20 cities and China's top 10 cities by scientific research output by the Nature Index. It ranked first in West China region, with a combined population of almost 300 million. The city also hosted the 2011 World Horticultural Exposition.

== Tourism ==
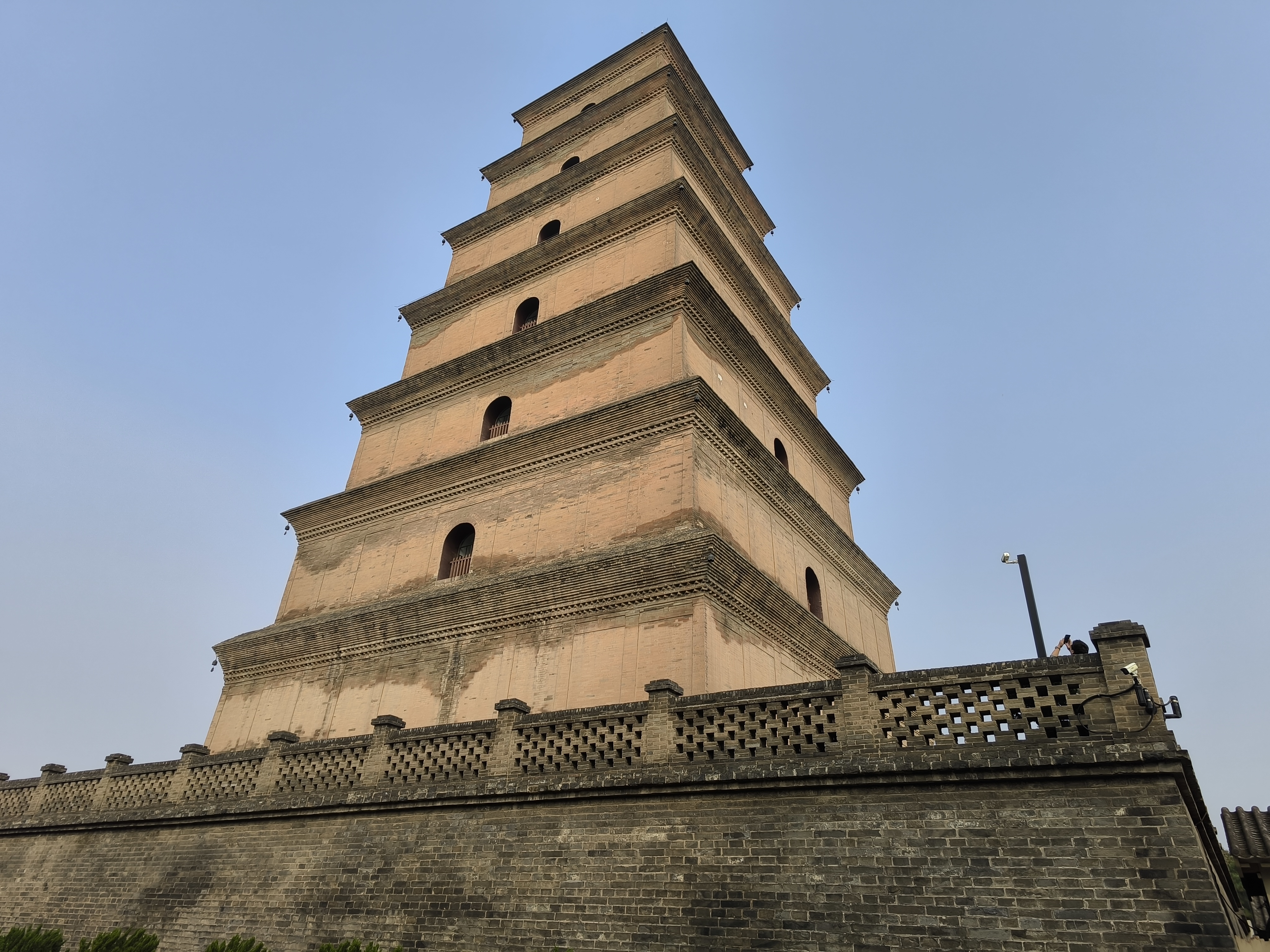
Giant Wild Goose Pagoda

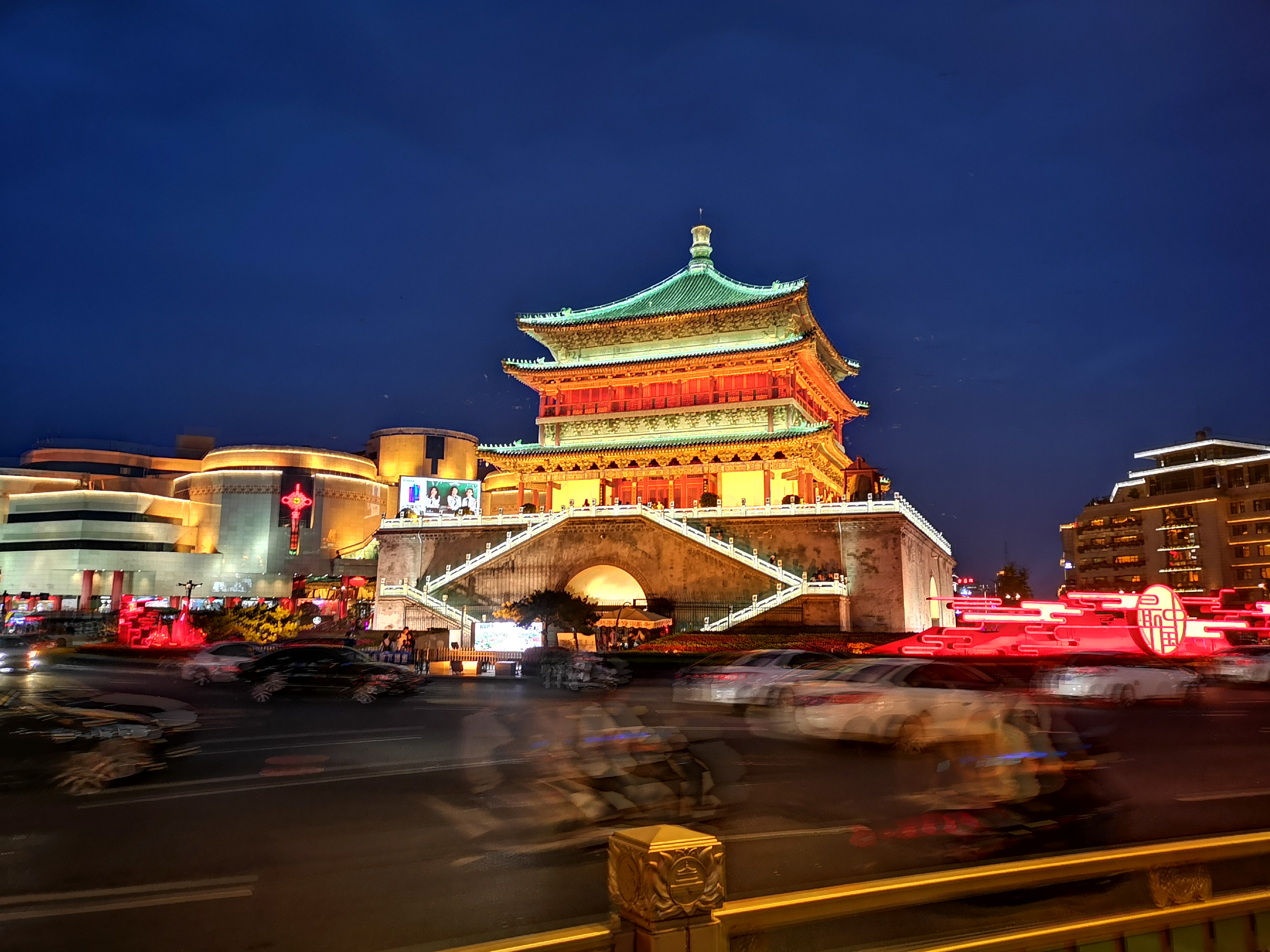
Bell Tower

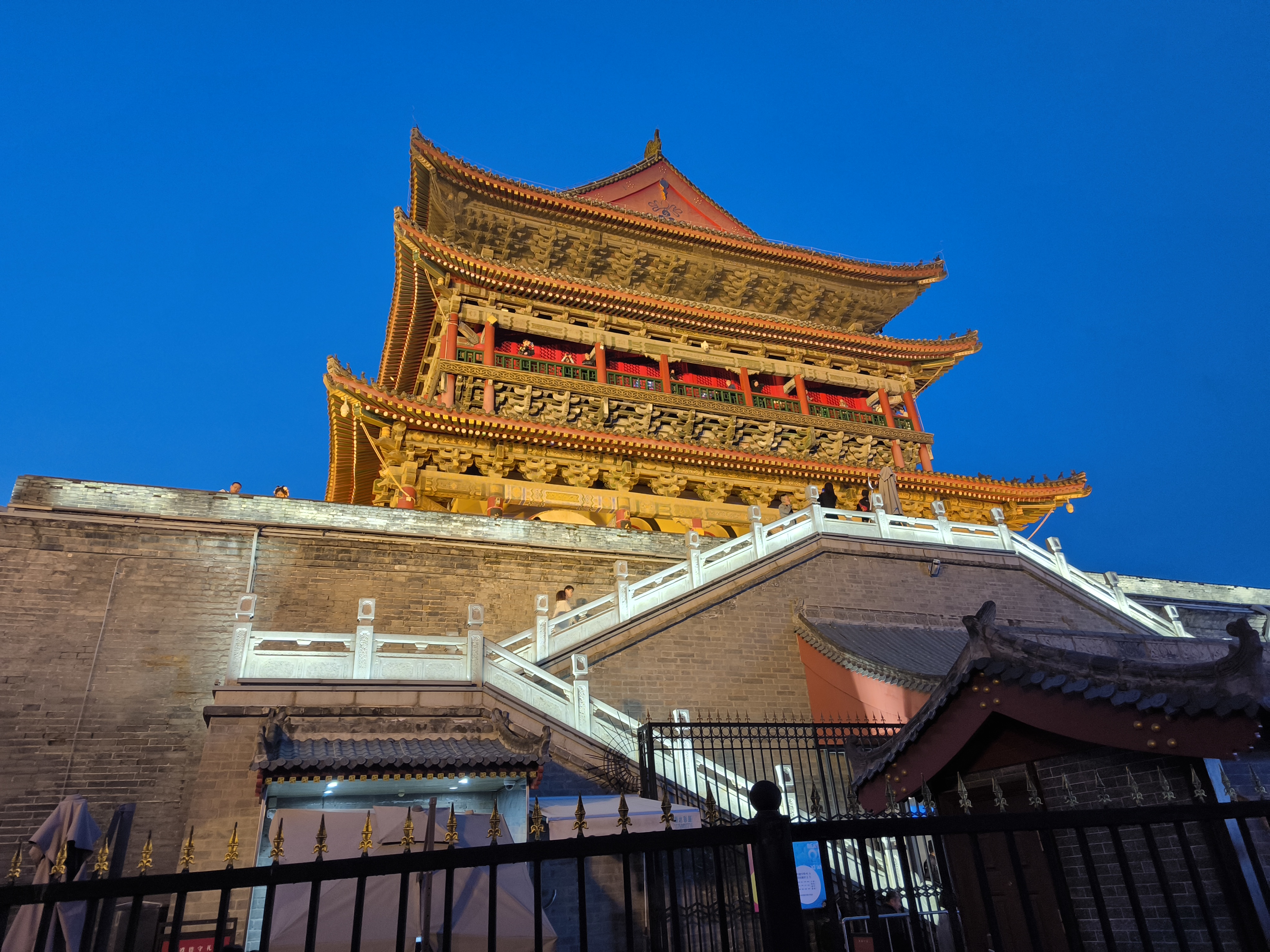
Drum Tower

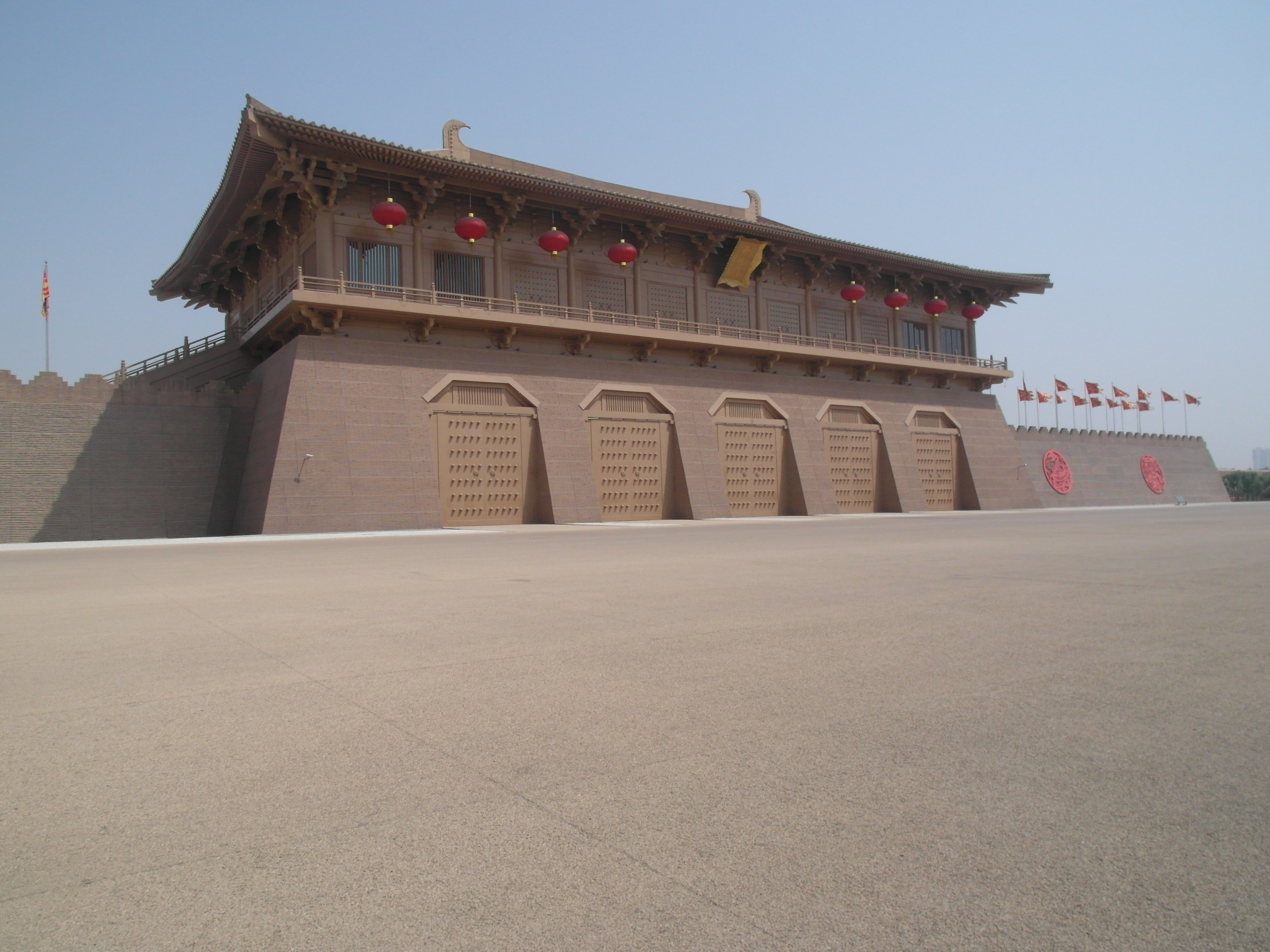
Reconstructed Danfeng Gate in Daming Palace National Heritage Park

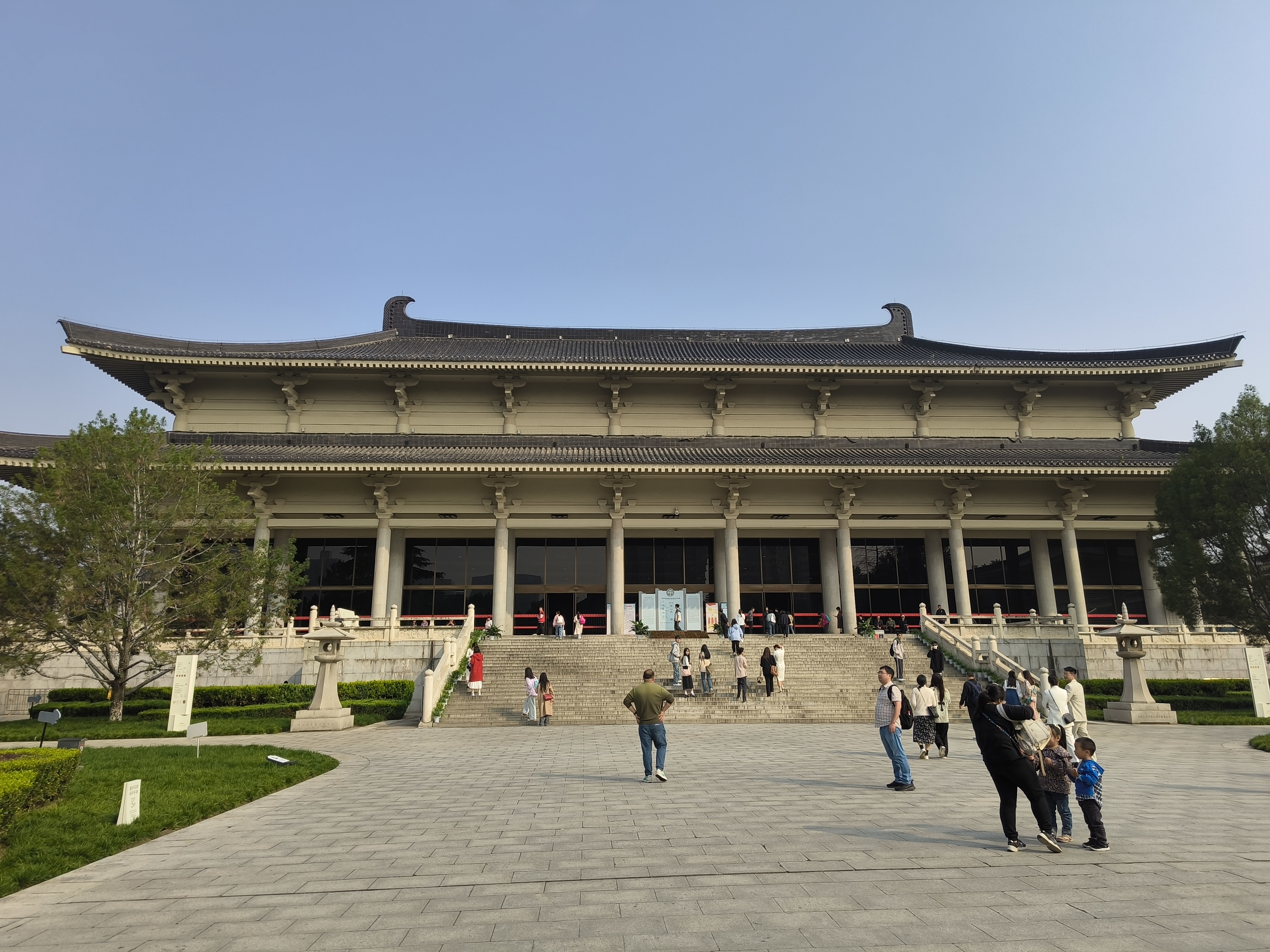
Shaanxi History Museum

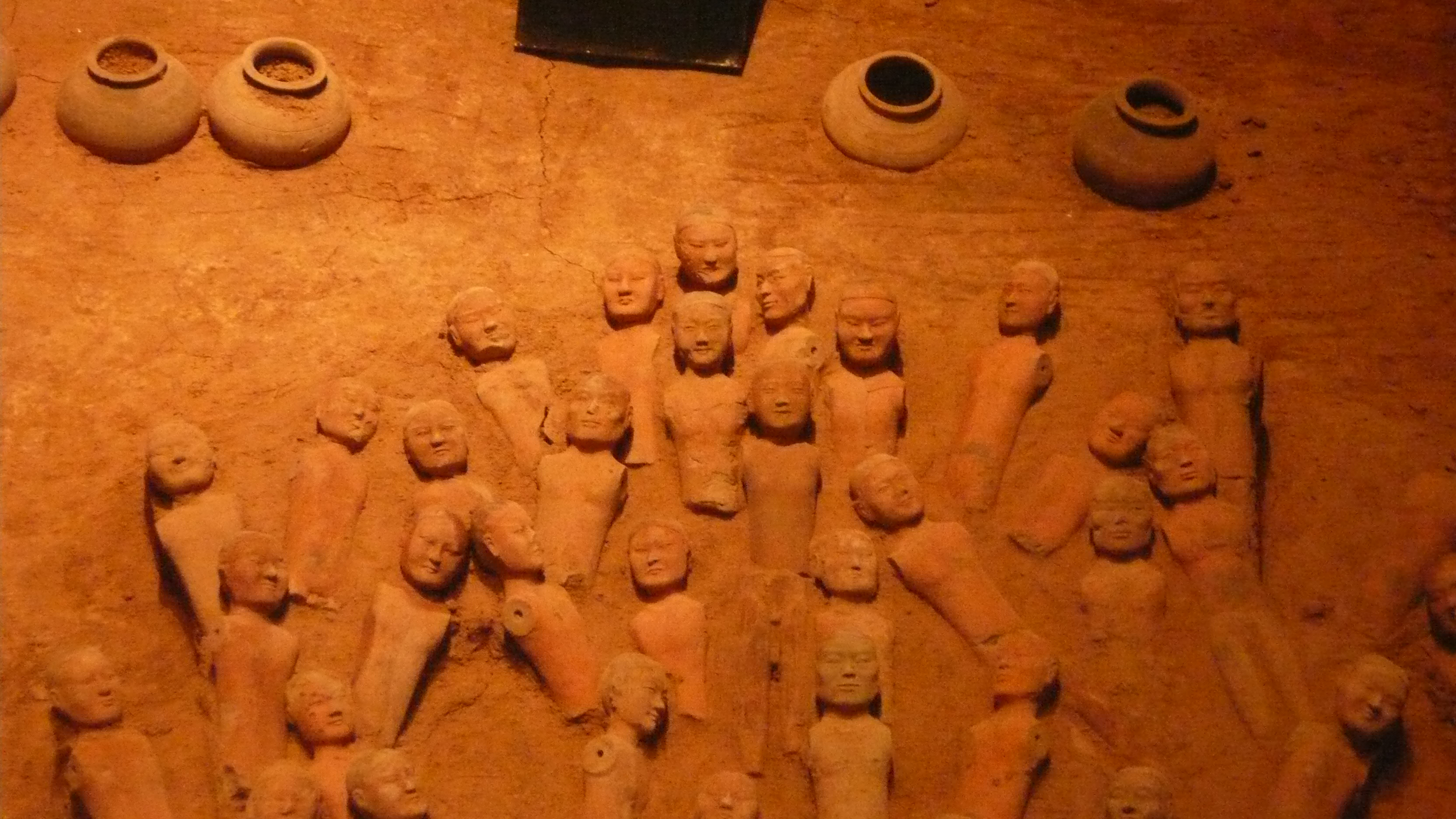
Pit in underground museum of Han Yang Ling, Mausoleum of Han Emperor Jingdi

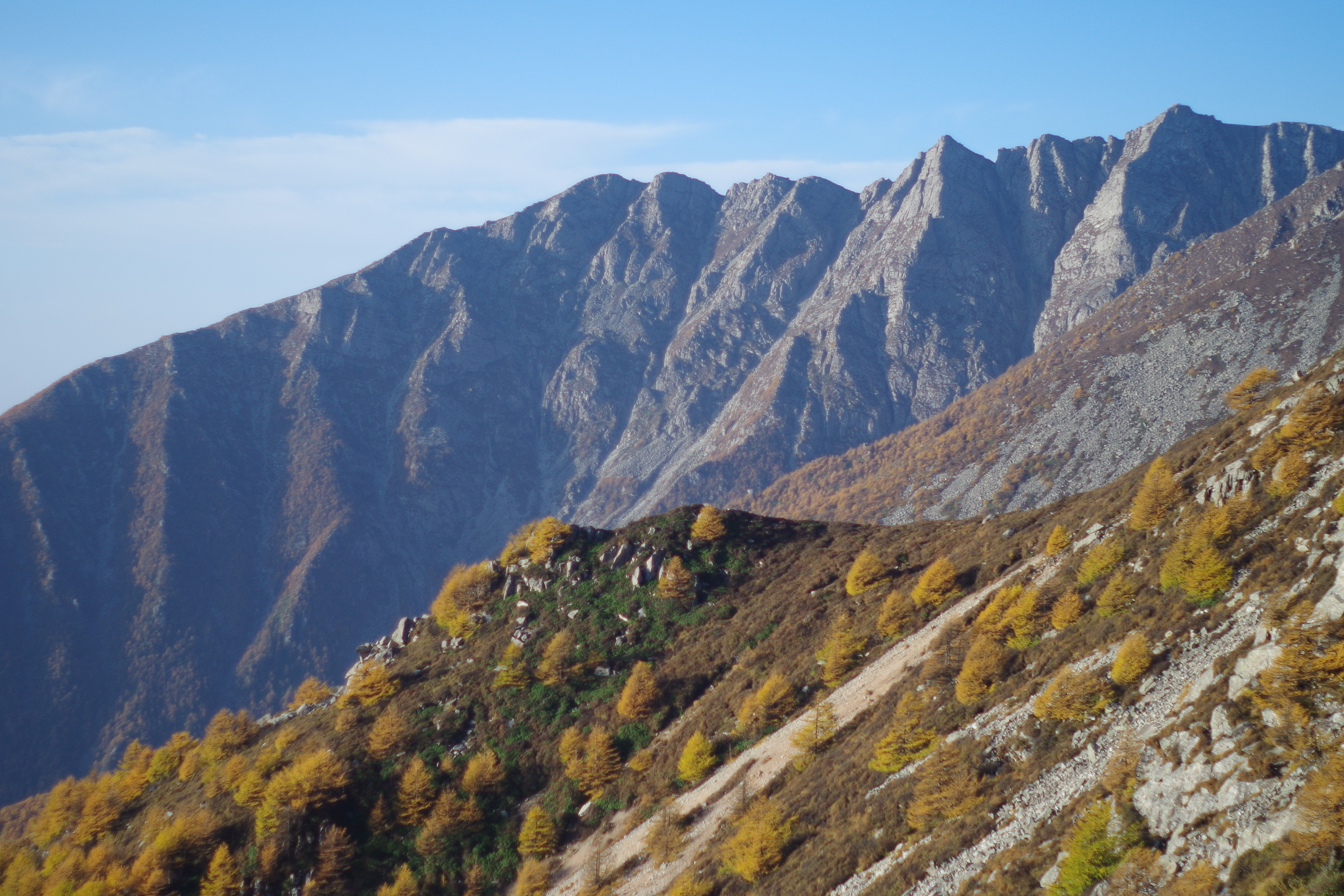
Mount Taibai National Forest Park

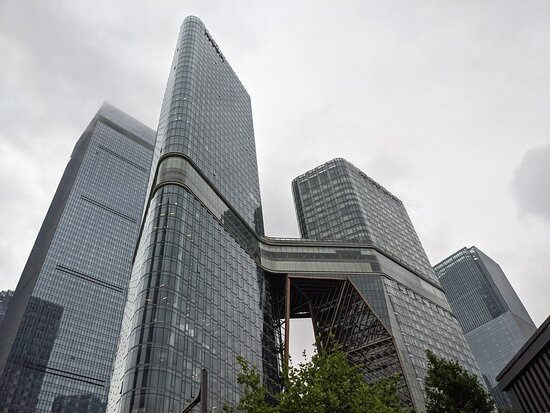
The Grand Hyatt Xi'an hotel in the CBD

=== Sites ===
Because of the city's many historical monuments and a plethora of ancient ruins and tombs in the vicinity, tourism has been an important component of the local economy, and the Xi'an region is one of the most popular tourist destinations in China.

The city has many important historical sites, and some are ongoing archaeological projects, such as the Mausoleum of Qin Shi Huang and his Terracotta Army. There are several burial mounds, tombs of the Zhou dynasty kings located in the city. Xi'an also contains some 800 royal mausoleums and tombs from the Han dynasty, with some of them yielding hundreds of sculpted clay soldiers, and remains of sacrificial temples from the Han era. The city has numerous Tang dynasty pagodas and is noted for its history museum and its stele forest, which is housed in an 11th-century Confucian temple containing large stone tablets from various dynasties.

Some of the most well-known sites in and around Xi'an are:

- The city is surrounded by a well-preserved city wall which was reconstructed in the 14th century during the early Ming dynasty and was based on the inner imperial palace of Tang dynasty.
- The Mausoleum of Qin Shi Huang and his Terracotta Army are located 40 km (25 mi) to the east of the city center, in the city's suburbs.
- The Bell Tower and Drum Tower, both are located at the city's central axis
- The city's Muslim Quarter, which is home to the Great Mosque of Xi'an
- The Giant Wild Goose Pagoda and Small Wild Goose Pagoda are both spectacular towers and both are well over 1,000 years old and have survived great earthquakes.
- The Stele Forest is famous for its numerous historic inscriptions and stoneworks.
- The Famen Temple and its towering pagoda located 120 kilometers (75 miles) west of Xi'an.
- Xi Ming Temple, a historic Buddhist temple
- Wolong Temple, a Buddhist temple at Kaitong lane near the Stele Forest
- Xingjiao Temple at Shaolin Yuan
- Jianfu Temple, which is associated with the Small Wild Goose Pagoda
- The Banpo Neolithic village
- The Shaanxi History Museum, which has a large collection of historical artifacts
- The Xi'an Museum, located near the Small Wild Goose Pagoda
- Huaqing Hot Springs, at the foot of Mt. Li, have a history of 6,000 years, the adjacent Huaqing Palace has a history of 3,000 years. Ranked among the Hundred Famous Gardens in China, it also has the status as a National Cultural Relic Protection Unit and a National Key Scenic Area.
- Daming Palace National Heritage Park, site of the former royal residence of the Tang dynasty emperors
- Mount Li National Forest Park
- Mount Zhongnan National Forest Park
- Datang Everbright City

== Sports ==
Famous former professional sports teams in Xi'an include:

- Chinese Jia-A League
  - Shaanxi National Power (moved to Ningbo and renamed themselves Ningbo National Power in 2004)
- Chinese Football Association Super League
  - Shaanxi Baorong Chanba (moved to Guiyang and renamed themselves Guizhou Renhe in 2012)
- Chinese Basketball Association
  - Shaanxi Dongsheng (moved to Foshan and renamed themselves Foshan Dralions in 2010).

== Media ==
=== Television and radio ===
- China Central Television's channel 1 through 12 is broadcast nationwide.
- Shaanxi Television (SXTV), provincial station, broadcasts on eight channels as well as a satellite channel for other provinces.
- Shaanxi Radio broadcasts music and news.

== International relations ==
Xi'an's twin towns and sister cities are:

Nara, Nara Prefecture, Japan (1974); Kyoto, Japan (1974); Edinburgh, United Kingdom (1985); Pau, Pyrénées-Atlantiques, Aquitaine, France (1986); Cambridge, Massachusetts, United States; Ithaca, New York, United States; Kansas City, Missouri, United States (1989); Washington, D.C., United States; Esfahan, Iran (1989); Dortmund, North Rhine-Westphalia, Germany (1991); Lahore, Pakistan (1992); Funabashi, Chiba, Japan (1994); Iași, Romania (1994)	Dnipro, Ukraine (1995); Istanbul, Turkey (1996); Kathmandu, Nepal (1996); Brasília, Brazil (1997); Cairo, Egypt (1997); Canberra, Australia; Hanoi, Vietnam; Huế, Vietnam; Ottawa, Ontario, Canada; Quebec City, Quebec, Canada (2001); Saskatoon, Saskatchewan, Canada; Victoria, Canada; Córdoba, Argentina (2006); Pompei, Campania, Italy (2007); Athens, Greece; Kalamata, Greece (2009)	Birmingham, United Kingdom; Cusco, Peru; Samarkand, Uzbekistan; Mary, Türkmenistan (2014); Melbourne, Victoria, Australia (2015); Kragujevac, Serbia (2016); Gyumri, Armenia (2013); Taupō, New Zealand; Groningen, The Netherlands (2011); George Town, Penang, Malaysia (2014); Kota Kinabalu, Sabah, Malaysia (2019); València, Land of Valencia, Spain (2020)

== See also ==
- New first-tier city

== Notes ==
Preceded by Yin	Capital of China (as Hao); 1046–771 BC	Succeeded by Luoyang
Preceded by Xianyang	Capital of China (as Chang'an); 206 BC – 25	Succeeded by Luoyang
Preceded by Luoyang	Capital of China (as Chang'an); 190–196	Succeeded by Xuchang
Preceded by Jiankang	Capital of China (as Daxing); 581–618	Succeeded by itself, as Chang'an
Preceded by itself, as Daxing	Capital of China (as Chang'an); 618–907	Succeeded by Kaifeng
