= Xi'an Museum =

Museum in Xi'an, China

- 西安博物院
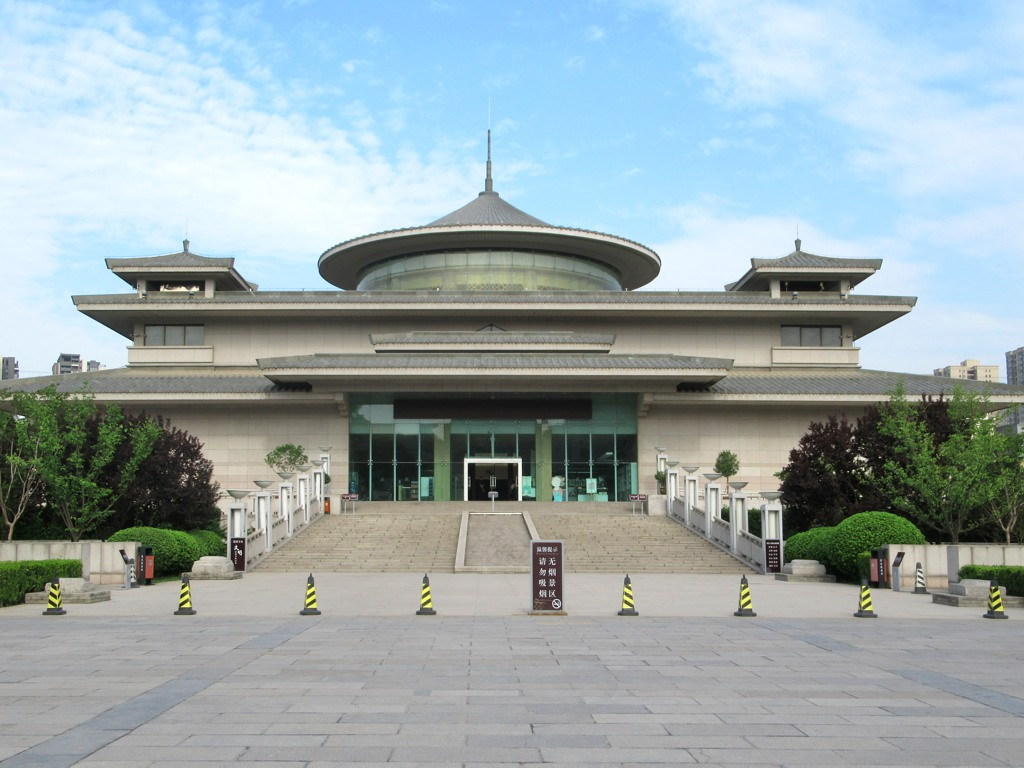
- Established: 18 May 2007
- Location: 72 Youyi West Road, Xi'an, Shaanxi, China
- Coordinates: 34.239°N 108.936°E
- Type: Public institution
- Curator: Xiang De (向德)
- Website: http://www.xabwy.com/

Xi'an Museum (Chinese: 西安博物院; pinyin: Xī'ān Bówùyuàn) is a museum on Youyi West Road, Beilin District, Xi'an, Shaanxi Province, China. Xi'an Museum had its official opening on 18 May 2007, "National Museum Day", with a total investment of 220 million RMB and a total area of 160,000 square meters. The complex includes three parts: the museum proper, the Tang-era Small Wild Goose Pagoda and Jianfu Temple historic area, and the museum gardens.

In 2012, Xi'an Museum was appraised by the National Cultural Heritage Administration and included in batch two of the national first-grade museums of China.

== Exhibits ==
The exhibition section has an area of over 16,000 square meters, and the exhibits occupy more than 5,000 square meters. The design of the exhibition section was directed by Zhang Jinqiu, an academician of the Chinese Academy of Engineering. The museum's collection includes 130,000 artifacts, including more than 14,400 that are considered to be national third-tier precious artifacts and above.

== Jianfu Temple ==
Jianfu Temple is a famous Tang dynasty imperial temple which was largely destroyed in the chaos of the late Tang dynasty, leaving only the Small Wild Goose Pagoda. The Small Wild Goose Pagoda, originally named Jianfu Temple Pagoda, is 43.4 meters tall and 11.38 meters long at its base. It preserves the style and features of the early Tang dynasty. In 1961 it was declared a Major Historical and Cultural Site Protected at the National Level by the State Council. The Tang dynasty astronomer Yi Xing practiced Buddhism at the temple with Śubhakarasiṃha and Vajrabodhi.

== See also ==
- Shaanxi History Museum
