= Giant Wild Goose Pagoda =

Tang-dynasty Buddhist pagoda in Xi'an, China

UNESCO World Heritage Site
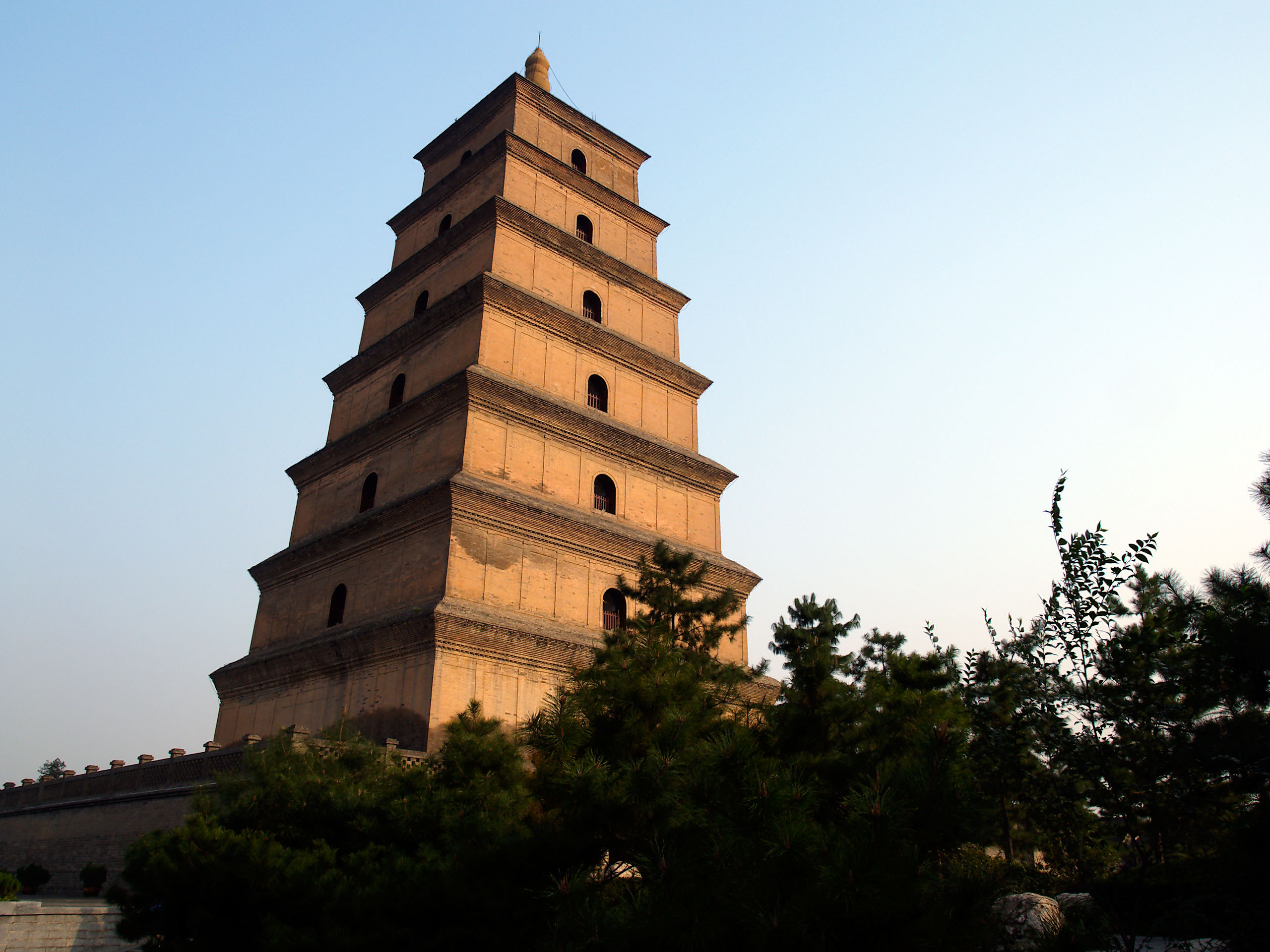
- Giant Wild Goose Pagoda

- Location within China
- Official name: R06–CN Great Wild Goose Pagoda
- Location: Xi'an, Yanta District, Shaanxi, China
- Part of: Silk Roads: the Routes Network of Chang'an-Tianshan Corridor
- Criteria: Cultural: (ii), (iii), (v), (vi)
- Reference: 1442
- Inscription: 2014 (38th Session)
- Coordinates: 34°13′11″N 108°57′34″E

Chinese name
- Chinese: 大雁塔
- Literal meaning: Greater Swan Goose Pagoda (as opposed to the Lesser Wild Goose Pagoda)
Transcriptions
Standard Mandarin
- Hanyu Pinyin: Dàyàn tǎ
- IPA: [tâ jɛ̂n tʰà]
Wu
- Suzhounese: Da^{6}-ie^{5} thaeq^{7}
Yue: Cantonese
- Yale Romanization: Daaih-ngaahn taap
- Jyutping: Daai6-ngaan6 taap3
- IPA: [taj˨ ŋan˨ tʰap̚˧]
Southern Min
- Tâi-lô: Tuā-gān thah

The Giant Wild Goose Pagoda or Big Wild Goose Pagoda (Chinese: 大雁塔, Dàyàn tǎ) is a seven-storey Buddhist pagoda in the Daci'en Temple complex in southern Xi'an, Shaanxi, China. It was first built in 652, when Xi'an was the Tang capital Chang'an, under the direction of the monk and translator Xuanzang. The original five-storey structure was rebuilt during the reign of Wu Zetian and repaired in later dynasties; the present brick exterior reflects major work carried out during the Ming dynasty.

The pagoda was built to store Buddhist scriptures and images that Xuanzang brought from India. Its association with Xuanzang and the translation work at Daci'en Temple makes it evidence of the transmission of Buddhism and texts between South, Central, and East Asia during the Tang period. Stone tablets by the south entrance bear texts composed by Emperor Taizong and Emperor Gaozong and written by the calligrapher Chu Suiliang. The Tang custom of successful examination candidates inscribing their names at the temple also produced the phrase "inscription at the Wild Goose Pagoda" for success in the imperial examinations.

The pagoda was inscribed in 2014 as a component of the UNESCO World Heritage Site Silk Roads: the Routes Network of Chang'an-Tianshan Corridor. The temple grounds and pagoda are open to visitors, with the surviving tower, inscriptions, and surrounding complex presenting the religious and urban history of Tang Chang'an.

== History ==
In the third year of Yonghui in the Tang dynasty (652), Xuanzang, in order to preserve the hundreds of Sanskrit scriptures he brought back from India, oversaw the construction of a pagoda in the western style at the Da Ci'en Temple. Initially known as the Ci'en Temple Pagoda, it was later renamed the Wild Goose Pagoda. To differentiate it from the smaller pagoda built later in Jianfu Temple, it became known as the Big Wild Goose Pagoda. As for the origin of the name "Wild Goose Pagoda," the most widely accepted theory is that it comes from the legend of "burying a wild goose and building a pagoda."

The original tower was a five-story structure with an outer layer of brick and an inner core of soil and stood at a height of 60 metres (200 ft). During the Chang'an years of the Wu Zhou Dynasty, the tower was already damaged due to weeds growing between the brick seams. Empress Wu Zetian and the nobles donated funds to demolish the original tower and rebuild it as a seven-story square pavilion-style tower. During the Dali years, it was expanded to ten stories, but later destroyed by war. It was subsequently rebuilt again as a seven-story tower. (Note: There has been ongoing debate about the number of floors of the Big Wild Goose Pagoda at the time. Some claim that the pagoda was altered to 10 floors, and only after the Anshi Rebellion was it finally changed to 7 floors. However, there is also a record of it having 7 floors in a Tang poem from the third year of the Tianbao reign)

During the Changxing years of the Five Dynasties period, the later Tang Dynasty (930-933 AD), the governor of West Beijing, An Chongba, oversaw the repair of the Big Wild Goose Pagoda. It was during this time that the pagoda took on its modern form. By the time of the Northern Song Dynasty, only the Big Wild Goose Pagoda remained of Ci'en Temple. In the second year of the Chenghua reign of the Ming Dynasty (1466), Ci'en Temple, including the Big Wild Goose Pagoda, underwent a complete renovation. In the thirty-second year of the Wanli Era (1604), a special restoration was carried out on the Big Wild Goose Pagoda, during which the ladders inside each level were reinstalled, and an additional sixty-centimeter-thick layer of cladding was built around the original Tang Dynasty structure. During the Kangxi period of the Qing Dynasty, the Big Wild Goose Pagoda began to tilt, and by 1996, the tilt had reached about 1 meter. Since then, restoration efforts have been made to stabilize and recover the structure. After the establishment of the People's Republic of China, the Big Wild Goose Pagoda received special protection measures. In 1963, the Big Wild Goose Pagoda was listed as a national key cultural relic protection unit, and in 2013, it was inscribed as part of the "Silk Road: Chang'an-Tianshan Corridor Network" on the World Heritage List.

== Structures ==
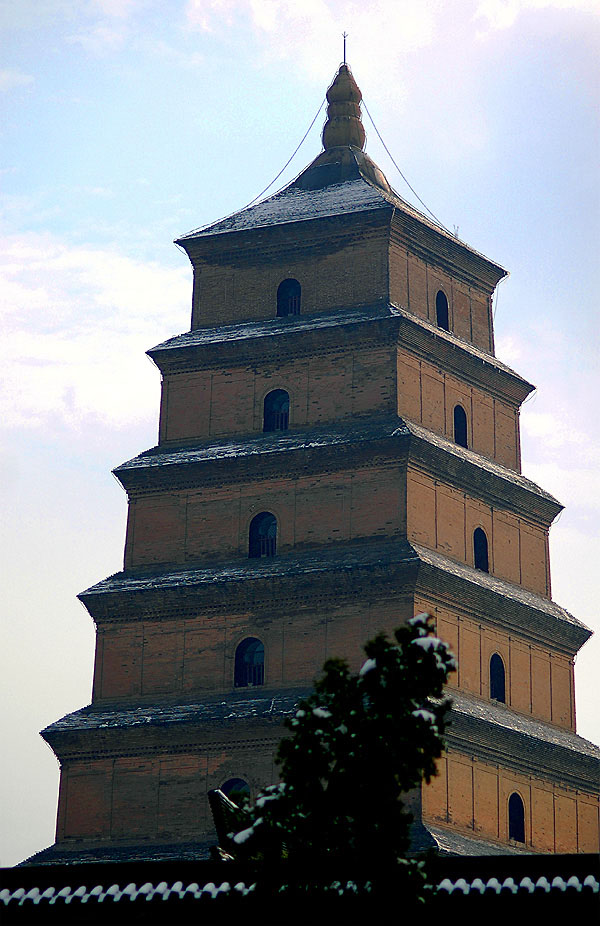
Close-up view of the Big Wild Goose Pagoda

The Big Wild Goose Pagoda is located in the northern part of Daci'en Temple and is a pavilion-style square brick pagoda composed of a base, body, and top. The total height of the pagoda, including the base, is 64.1 meters. The pagoda's base is approximately 4.2 meters high, with a north-south width of about 48.8 meters. The length of the lowest side of the tower body is 25 meters, and the upper levels gradually taper, forming a cone-like shape. At the junction of each floor, there are square pillars, balustrades, arches, and dougong, all built in imitation of wooden structures. Each level of the tower contains open rooms. The first and second levels have 10 hidden columns on each side, with the rooms on these levels divided into 9 sections. The third and fourth levels have 8 hidden columns on each side, dividing the rooms into 7 sections. From the fifth to the seventh levels, there are 6 hidden columns on each side, dividing the rooms into 5 sections. Each room is adorned with frescoes, mainly depicting Xuanzang's journey to the west to retrieve the scriptures. On the first floor, there are stone doors on all four sides, with engraved Buddha and Heavenly King statues on the lintels. Each floor has a brick archway on all four sides, and the interior of the tower is equipped with stairs for ascending, with a total of 248 steps. On all four sides of the ground floor, the archway doors have door lintels and frames made of bluestone, with line carvings of Buddha figures above. The west lintel features a carving of Amitabha Buddha giving a sermon.

In the brick niches on both sides outside the south door of the pagoda's ground floor, there are two stone tablets. One tablet contains the "Preface to the Sacred Teachings of the Great Tang Sanzang," written by Emperor Taizong Li Shimin of the Tang Dynasty in the 22nd year of the Zhenguan era (648) for the scriptures translated by Xuanzang. The other tablet contains the "Record of the Preface to the Sacred Teachings of the Great Tang Sanzang," written by Emperor Gaozong Li Zhi for the same preface. Both stone tablets were inscribed by Chu Suiliang and are relatively well-preserved, with clear handwriting. A coiled chi dragon is engraved on the top of the stele, the sides are adorned with carvings of curly-leaf trailing grass, and the pedestal features patterns of celestial beings dancing and playing music.

== Development and conservation ==
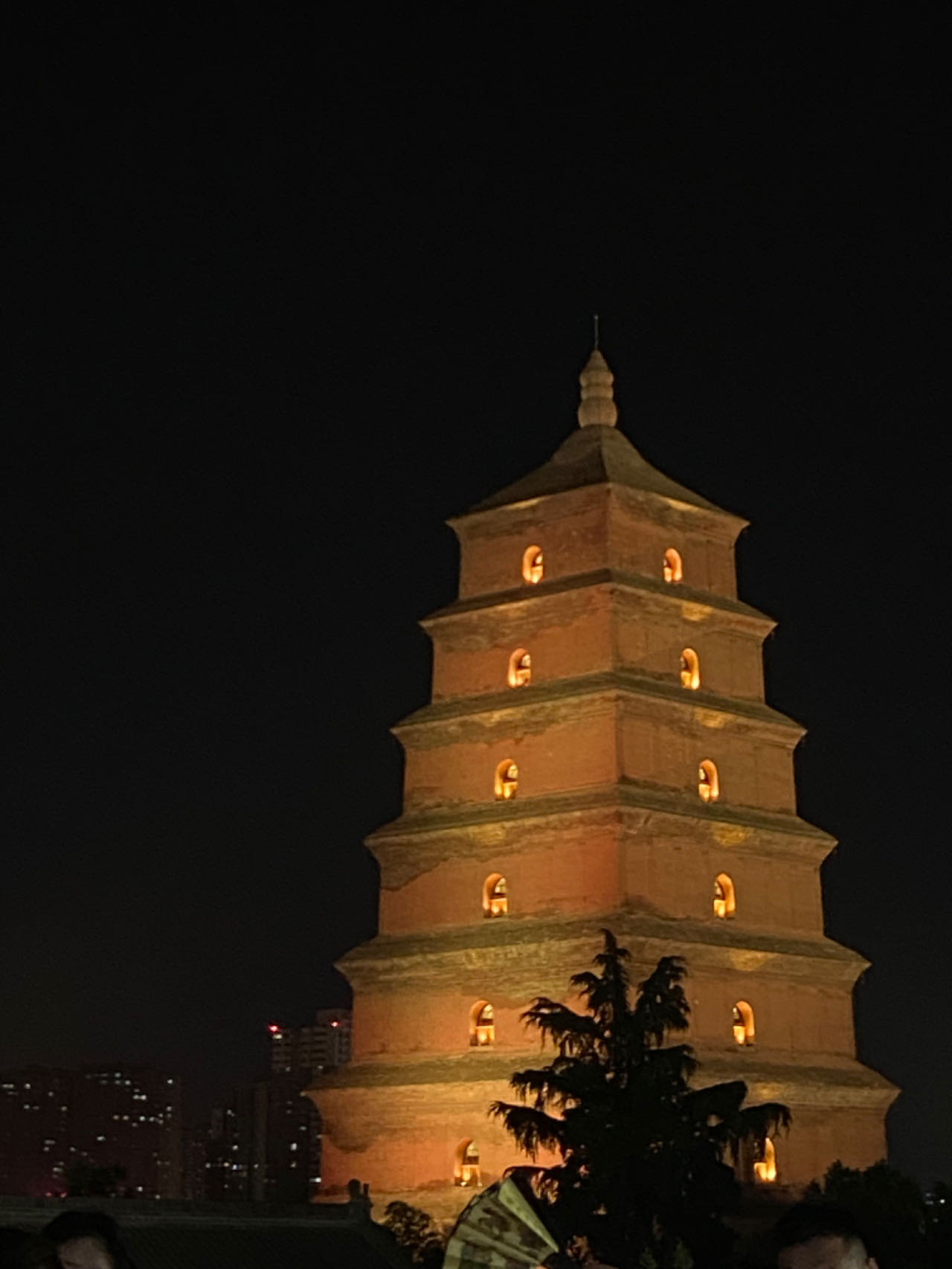
Night view photo of the Big Wild Goose Pagoda

In 1954, the internal spiral staircase of the Big Wild Goose Pagoda was replaced, and the inner walls of the tower were refurbished. In 1961, the Big Wild Goose Pagoda was designated as a Major cultural heritage sites under national-level protection. In 1962, lightning protection equipment was installed on the tower. In 1963, the top of the Big Wild Goose Pagoda was refurbished. In 1990, after receiving approval from the State Bureau of Cultural Relics, the custodians of the Big Wild Goose Pagoda organized personnel to carry out maintenance work, which continued until 1992. The main tasks included reinforcing the eaves of the second level, repairing the top of the pagoda, and replacing some damaged bricks on the ground floor. In June 1995, the lightning protection system of the Big Wild Goose Pagoda underwent a comprehensive upgrade, which lasted for one year. From 2000 to 2003, a project to prevent water seepage and reinforce the pagoda's top and eaves was completed. In 2008, the Wenchuan earthquake caused leakage at the top of the Big Wild Goose Pagoda. The related repair work began in June 2012 and was successfully completed. On June 22, 2014, the "Silk Road: Chang'an-Tianshan Corridor Road Network" project, jointly submitted by China, Kazakhstan, and Kyrgyzstan, was successfully inscribed at the 38th World Heritage Committee session. The Big Wild Goose Pagoda, along with the Small Wild Goose Pagoda and Xingjiao Temple, was included in the World Heritage List.

In 1956, the Xi'an Municipal People's Government established a dedicated institution for the protection of the Big Wild Goose Pagoda, known as the Big Wild Goose Pagoda Custodian Office. The custodian office is mainly responsible for the daily maintenance of the Big Wild Goose Pagoda, handling emergencies, organizing large-scale maintenance projects, and overseeing tourism development. It has been successively under the administration of the Xi'an Bureau of Culture, Bureau of Cultural Relics, and Bureau of Cultural Relics and Parks. In 1983, the management of the Big Wild Goose Pagoda Custodian Office was transferred to the Xi'an Municipal Committee of Ethnic Affairs. (Note: Now known as the Xi’an Municipal Bureau of Religious Affairs) On July 16, 2013, the Xi'an Municipal People's Government reviewed and passed the Measures for the Protection and Management of the Big Wild Goose Pagoda of Xi'an, which came into effect on August 26, 2013.

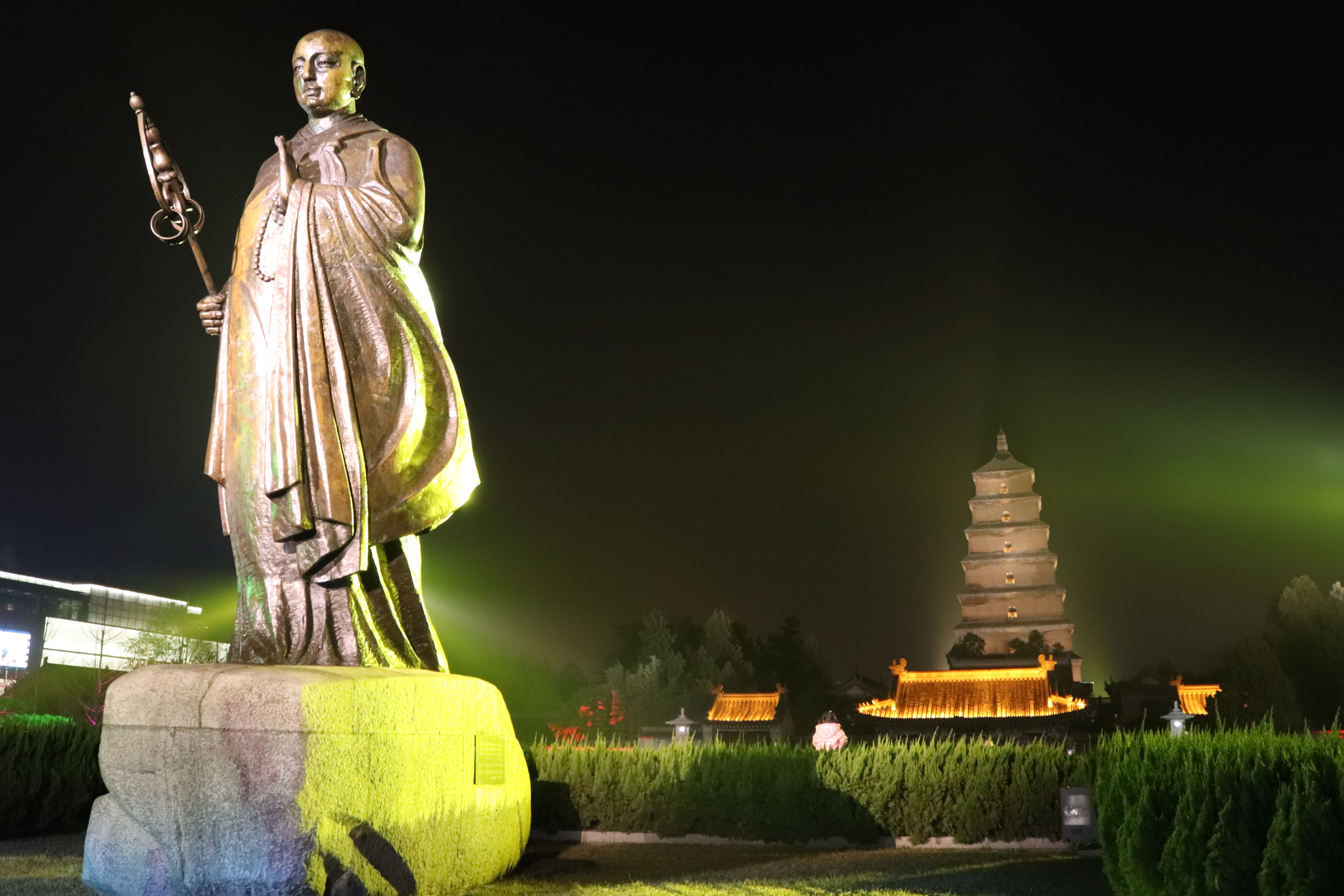
The Big Wild Goose Pagoda and the Statue of Xuanzang at Night

Due to the over-exploitation of local groundwater, the tilt of the Big Wild Goose Pagoda began to accelerate from 1945 onwards. From 1985 to 1996, the tilt rate reached an average of 1 millimeter per year. By 1996, according to field measurements conducted by the surveying and mapping unit of the People's Republic of China, the tilt had already reached 1.0105 meters. In response, the Xi'an municipal government began implementing well-sealing measures in 1996 for over 400 captive wells in the units surrounding the Big Wild Goose Pagoda. This allowed the pagoda to gradually return to its original position starting in 1997. By the end of 2006, the Big Wild Goose Pagoda had shifted 9.4 millimeters in the opposite direction of the tilt, at an average rate of about 1 millimeter per year, with a relatively stable speed.

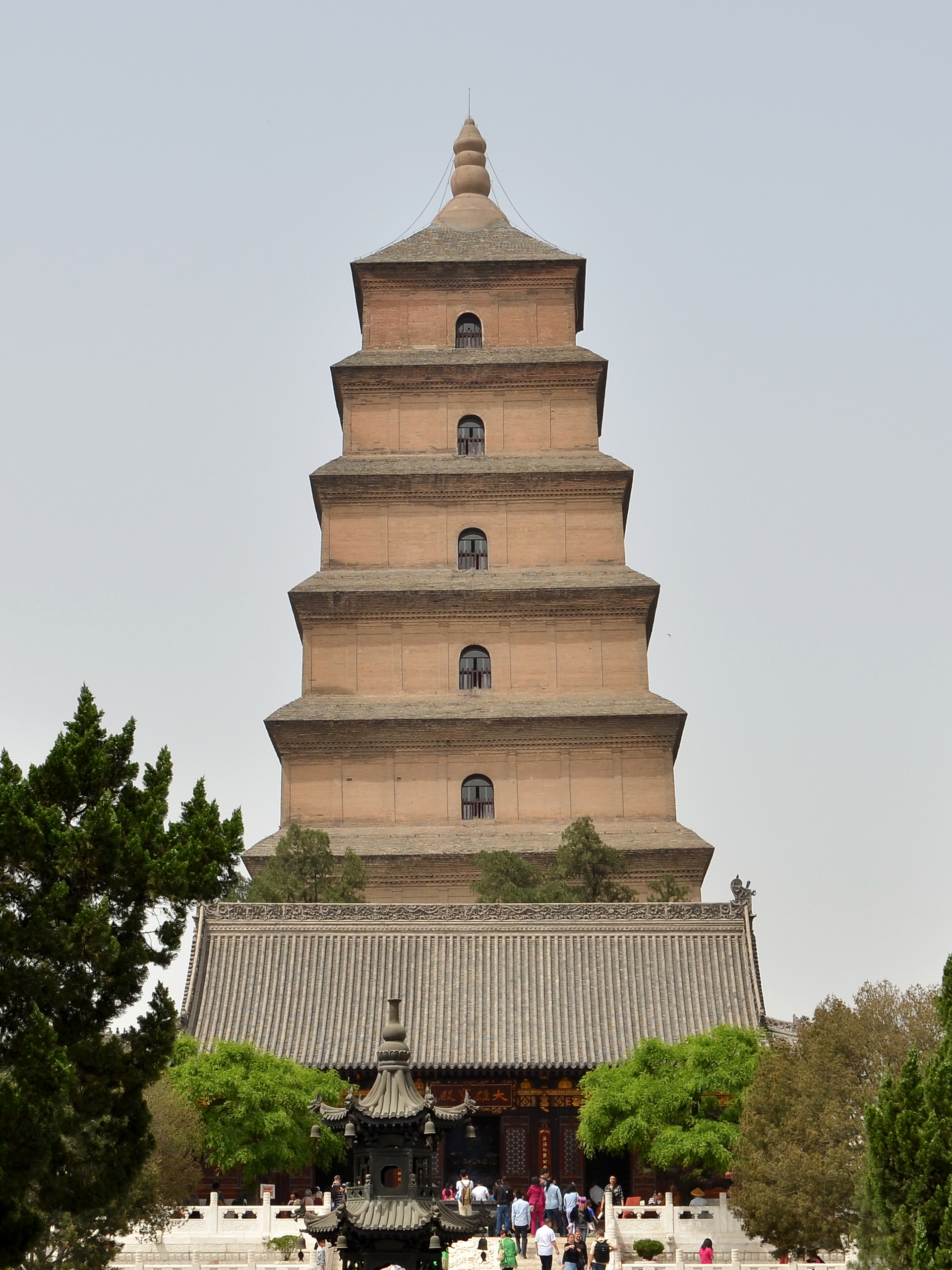
From the front view of the Big Wild Goose Pagoda, compared to the Daxiong Hall in front, the pagoda shows a noticeable tilt.

In 1988, the design of Xi'an's city emblem was officially completed, with the silhouette of the Big Wild Goose Pagoda as its main component. In early 2001, the South Square of the Big Wild Goose Pagoda was officially completed in front of Daci'en Temple. Covering an area of 32.6 acres, the square includes a statue of Xuanzang, landscaped gardens, granite paving, and a water bridge, among other facilities. In December 2002, demolition and reconstruction officially began on the north side of the Big Wild Goose Pagoda. In March 2003, construction of the North Plaza of the Big Wild Goose Pagoda commenced, and by December 2003, it was completed. The entire plaza stretches 300 meters from north to south and 450 meters from east to west, covering a total area of 200 acres. It mainly consists of a central water feature, the Tang Culture Theme Plaza, open gardens, an art promenade, and commercial facilities. In 2013, the original 20 yuan off-season ticket and 30 yuan peak-season ticket prices for the Big Wild Goose Pagoda were met with complaints from tourists. However, after the complaints, the peak-season ticket price was instead raised to 40 yuan. In response, the Shaanxi Provincial Price Bureau issued a statement on its official website, stating that the price increase had not gone through the approval process and that the decision to raise the price was actually a staff error. In addition, in 2013, to ensure the Big Wild Goose Pagoda's role as an absolute landmark in its surroundings, the Xi'an Municipal Planning Bureau announced the buffer zone around the pagoda. The specific boundaries of the buffer zone are as follows: from the North to the South Second Ring Road, from the South to Yannan Third Road, from the West to Cuihua Road, and from the East to Furong East Road. It also includes three "line of sight corridors" stretching from Yanta Road to Hepingmen Gate, Yanta West Road to Hengguang Road, and Yanta South Road to the red line of Yannan Fourth Road. The buffer zone is divided into height control areas of 6 meters, 9 meters, 12 meters, 18 meters, 24 meters, 36 meters, 45 meters, and 60 meters.

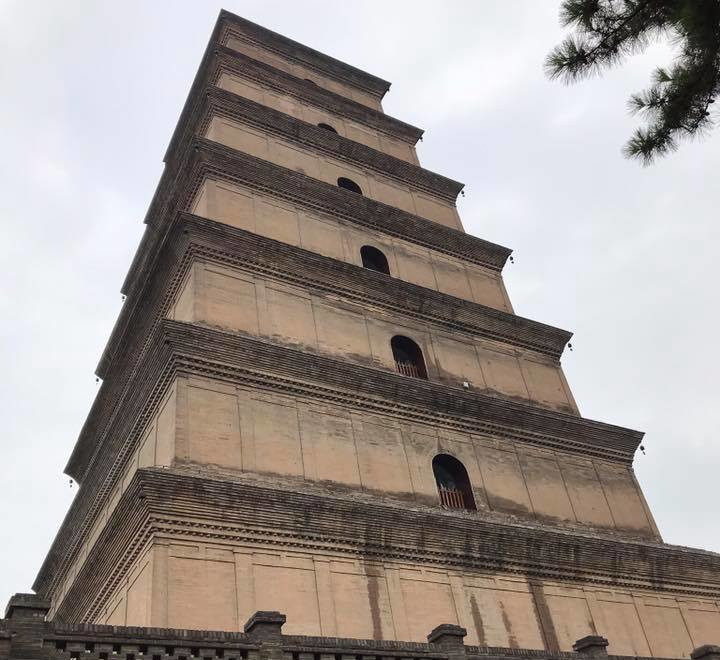
Side view

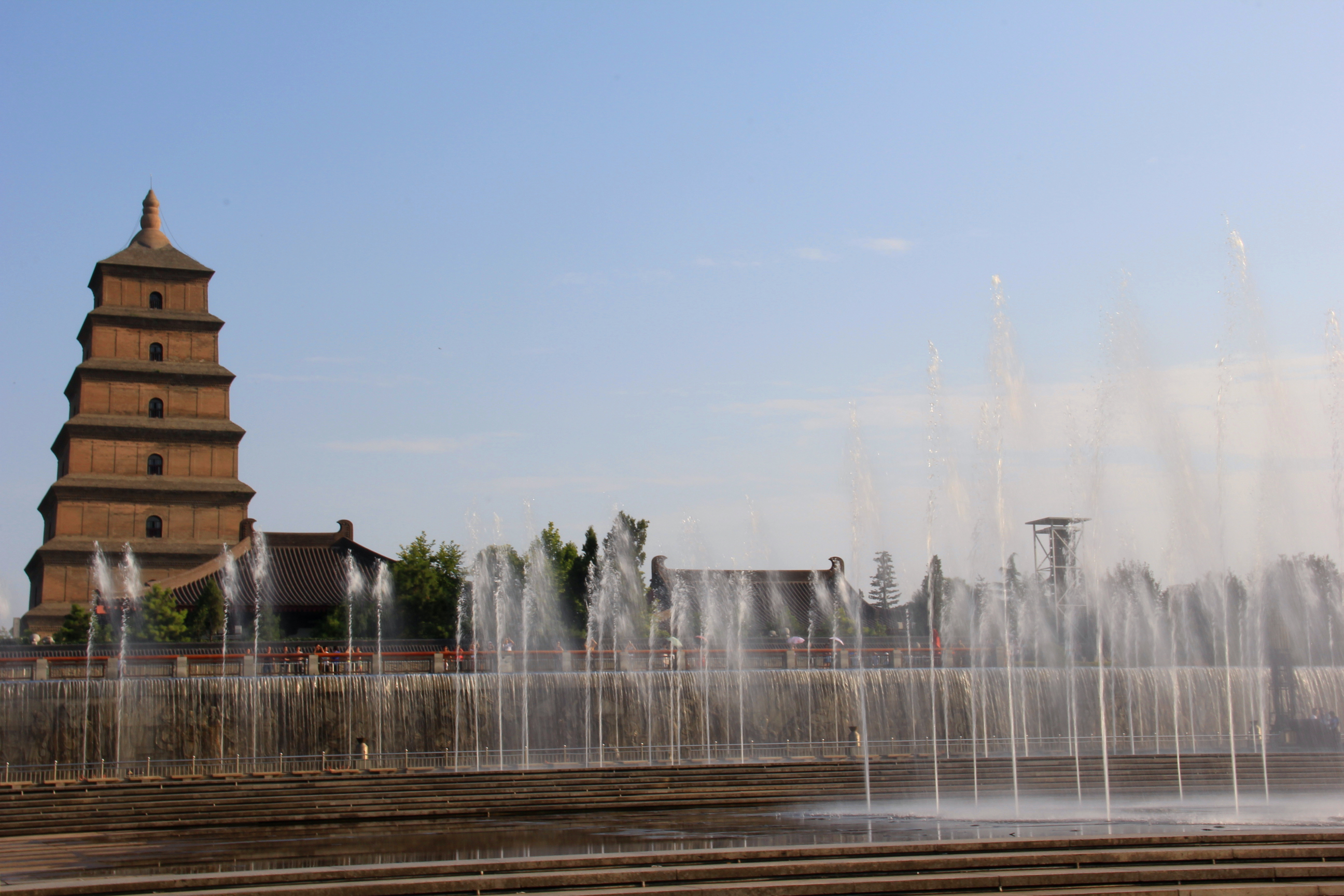
There are regular fountain shows at the North Square of the Big Wild Goose Pagoda.

== Gallery ==
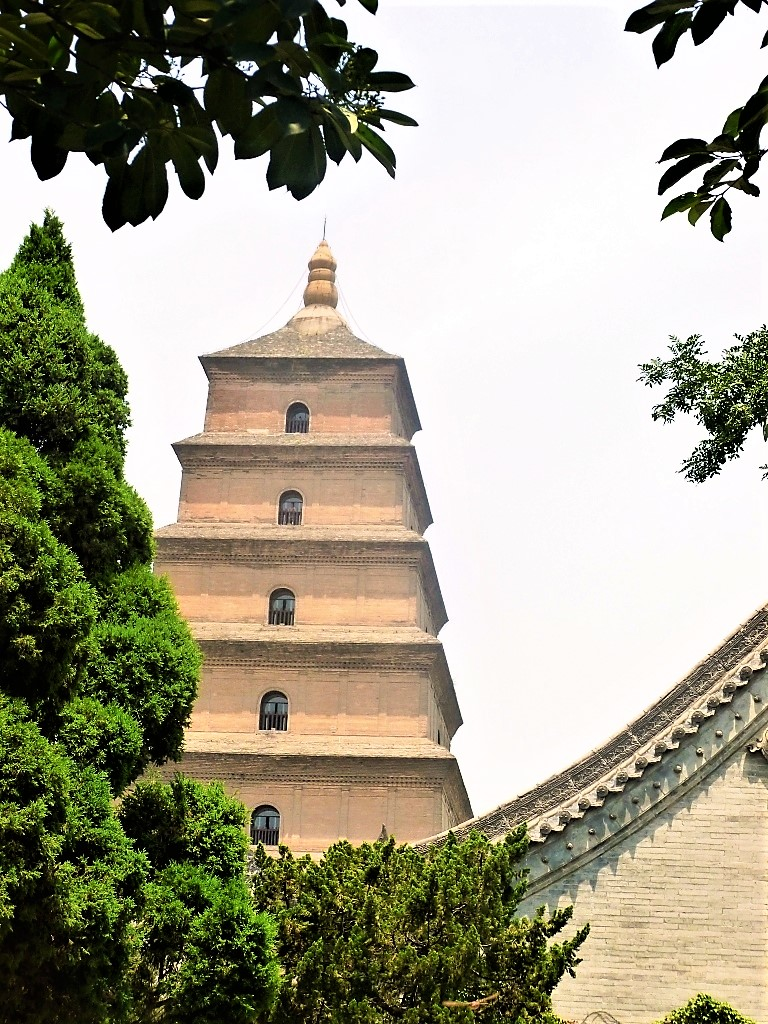
Giant Wild Goose Pagoda, Xi'an

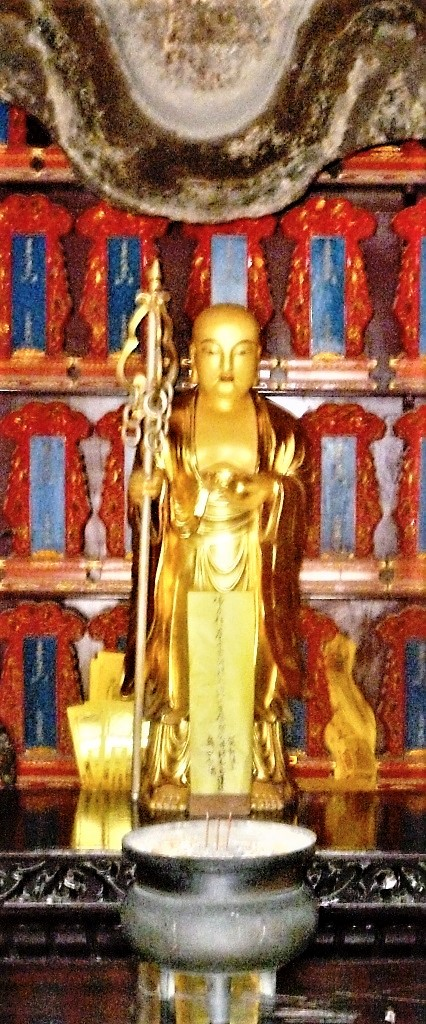
Golden statue of Xuanzang. Giant Wild Goose Pagoda, Xi'an

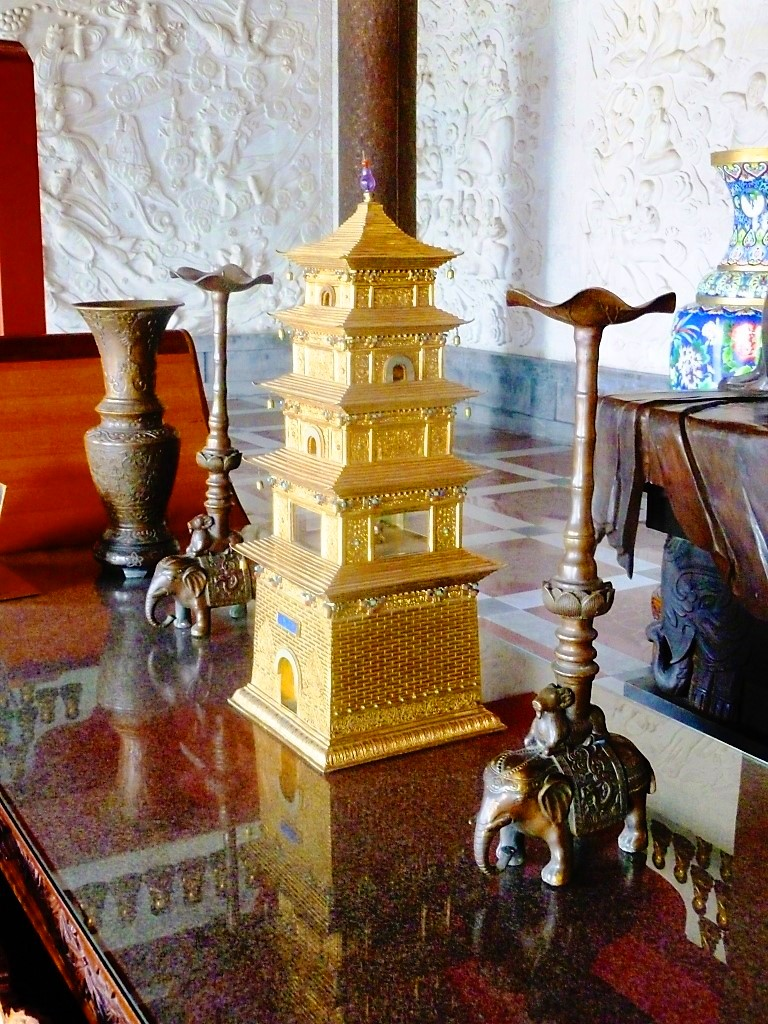
Gold Pagoda inside Wild Goose Pagoda, Xi'an

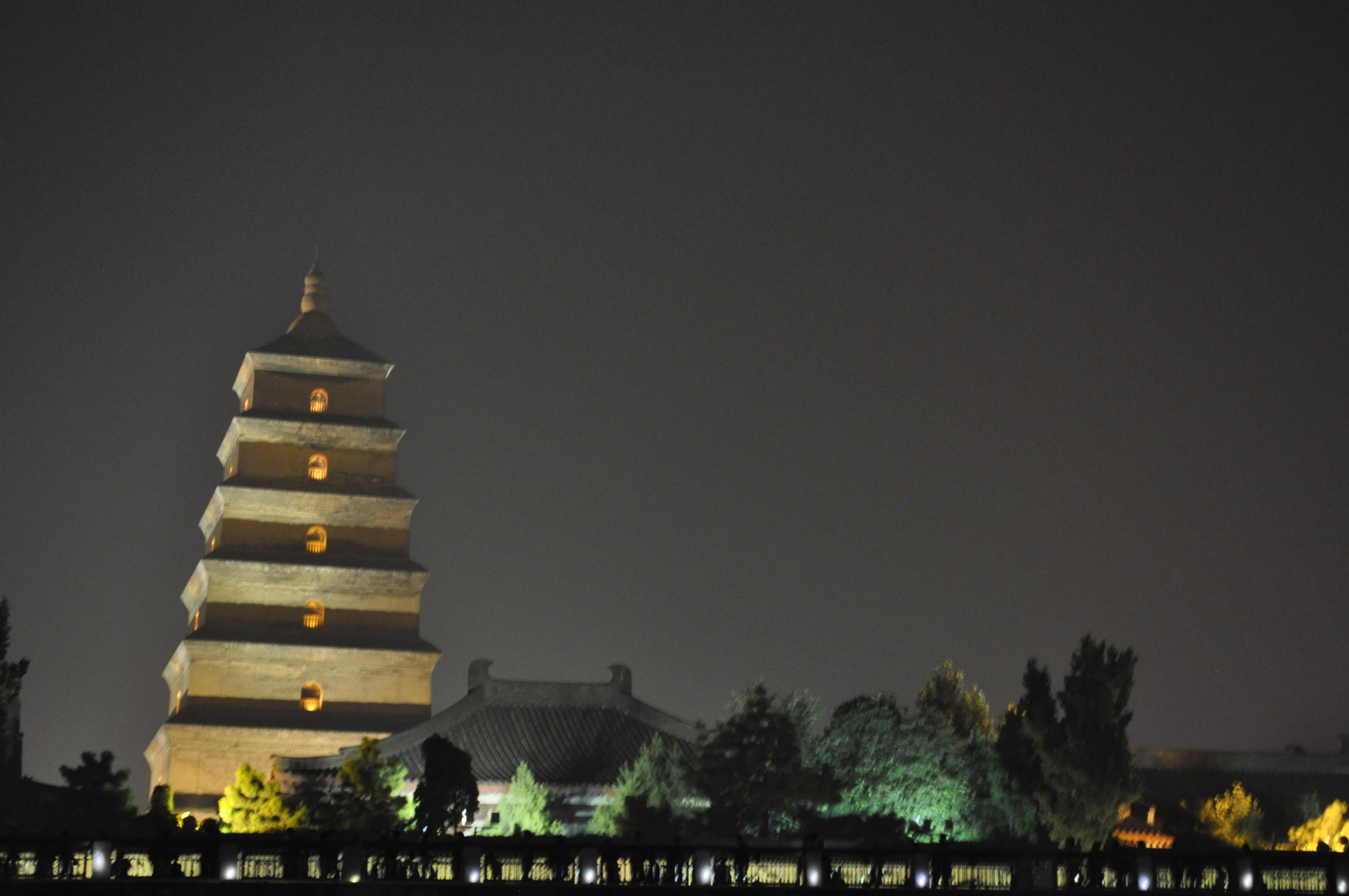
Giant Wild Goose Pagoda by night

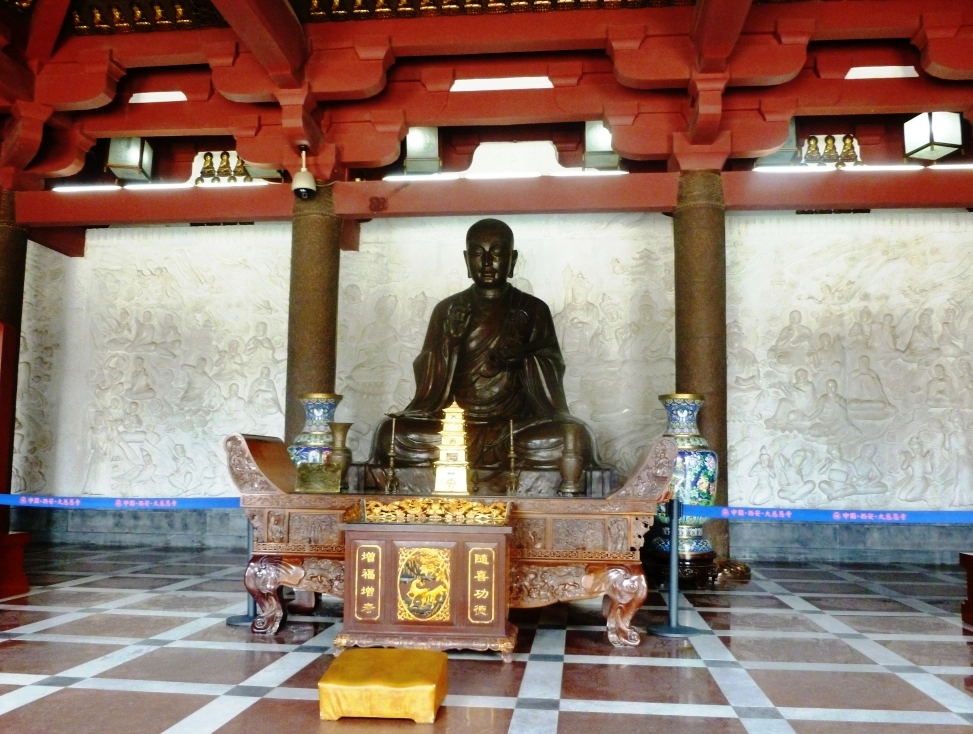
Statue of Xuanzang. Giant Wild Goose Pagoda, Xi'an.

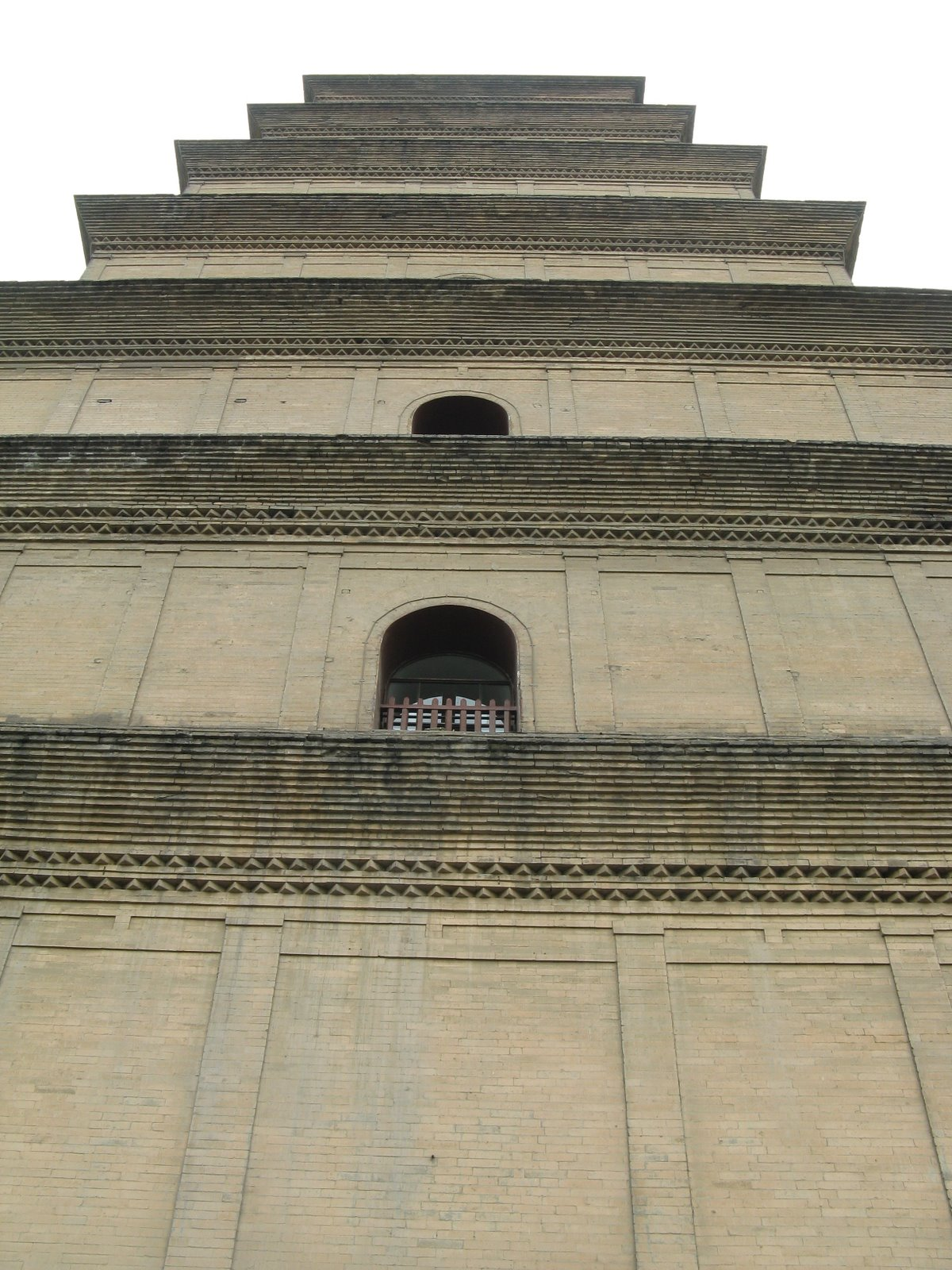
Close-up view of the eaves and exterior bricks

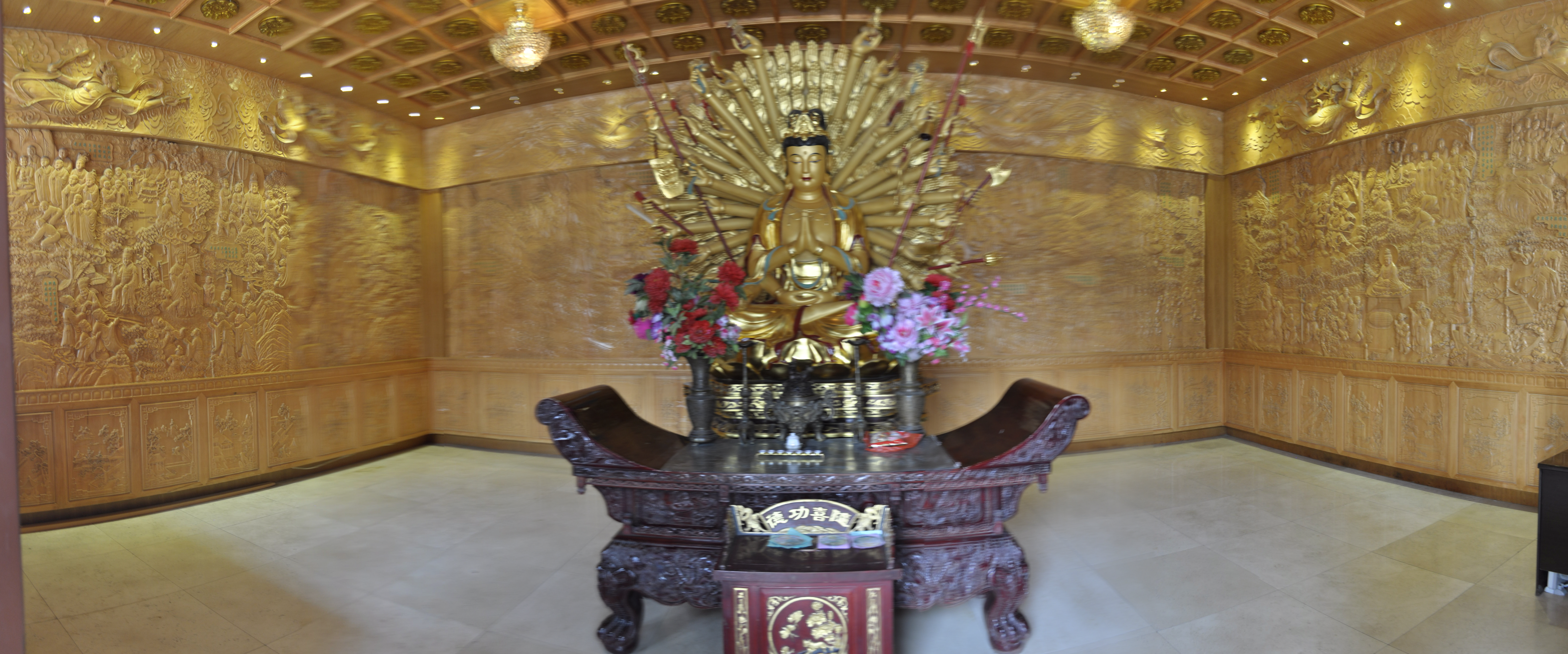
Avalokiteshvara Hall

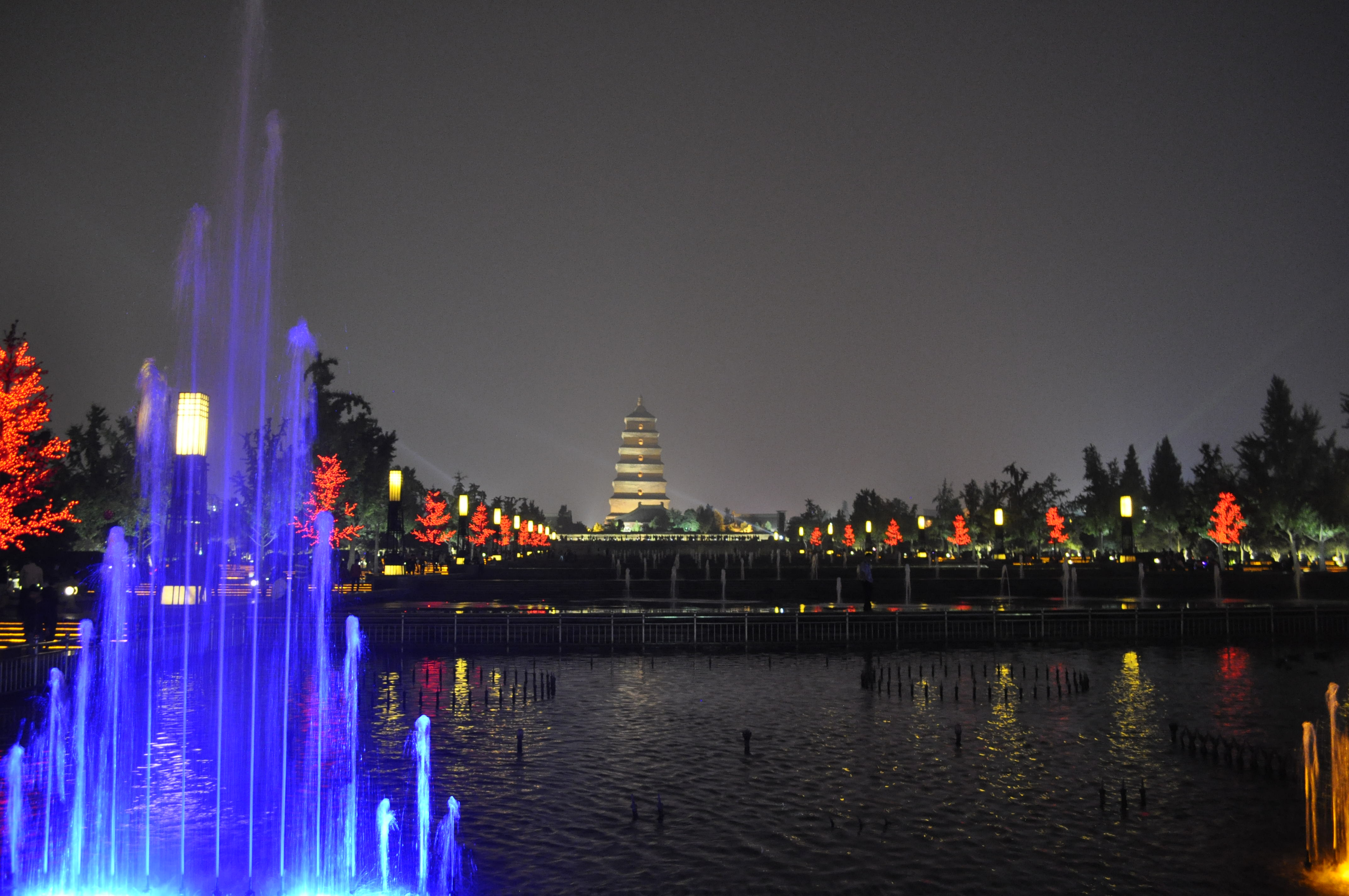
View from the park

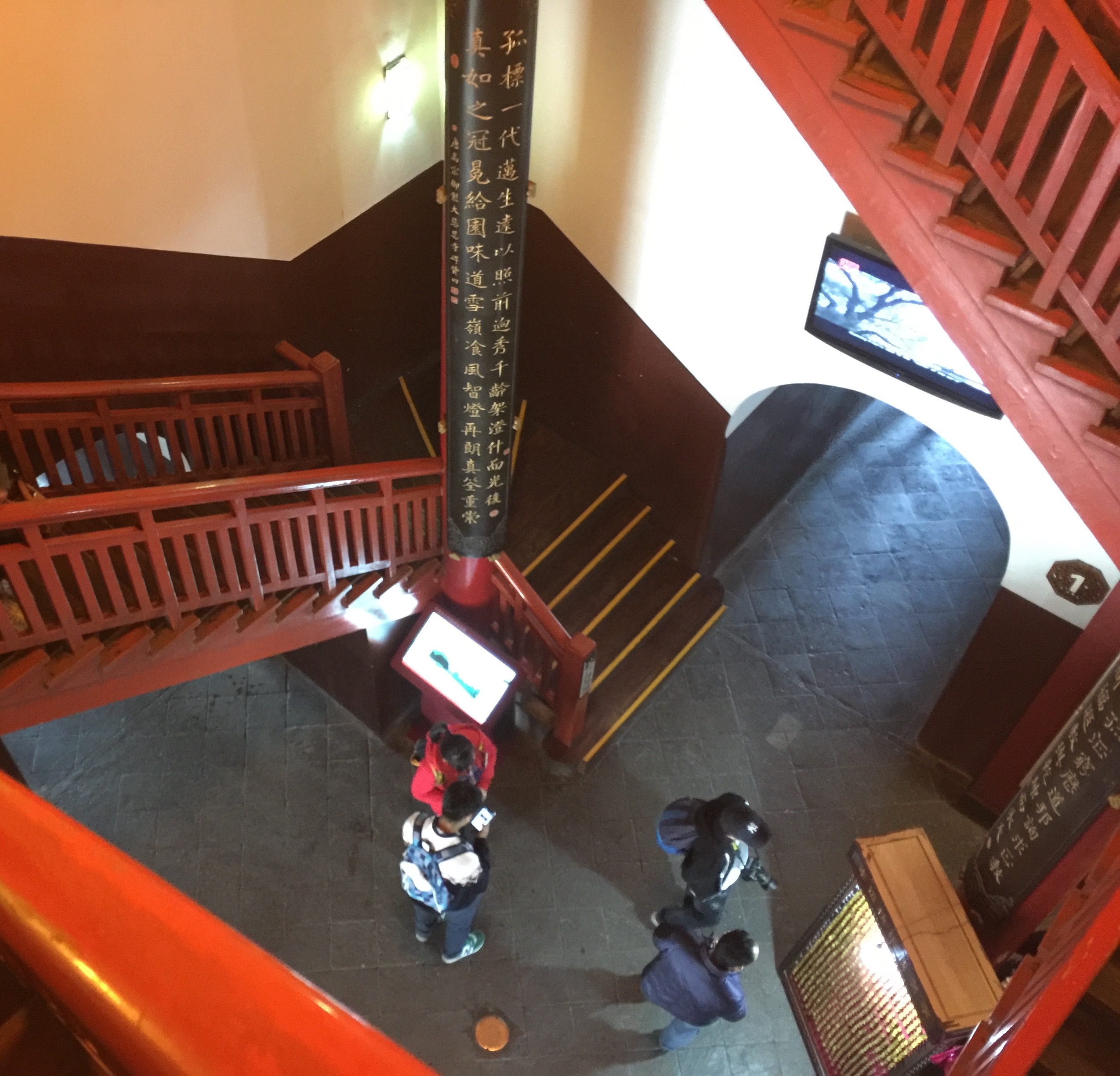
Inside the Giant Wild Goose Pagoda

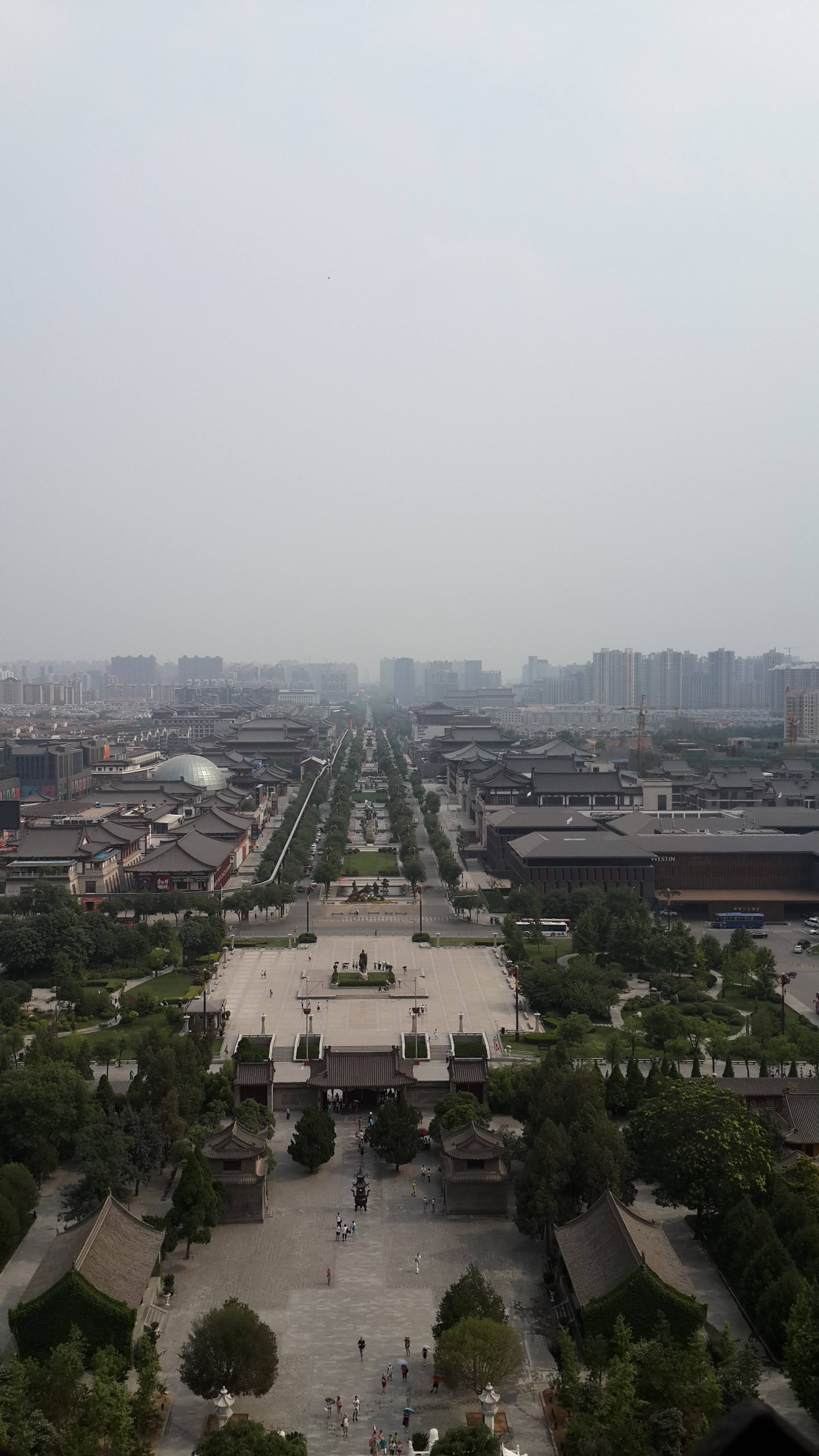
View from the top, in 2014

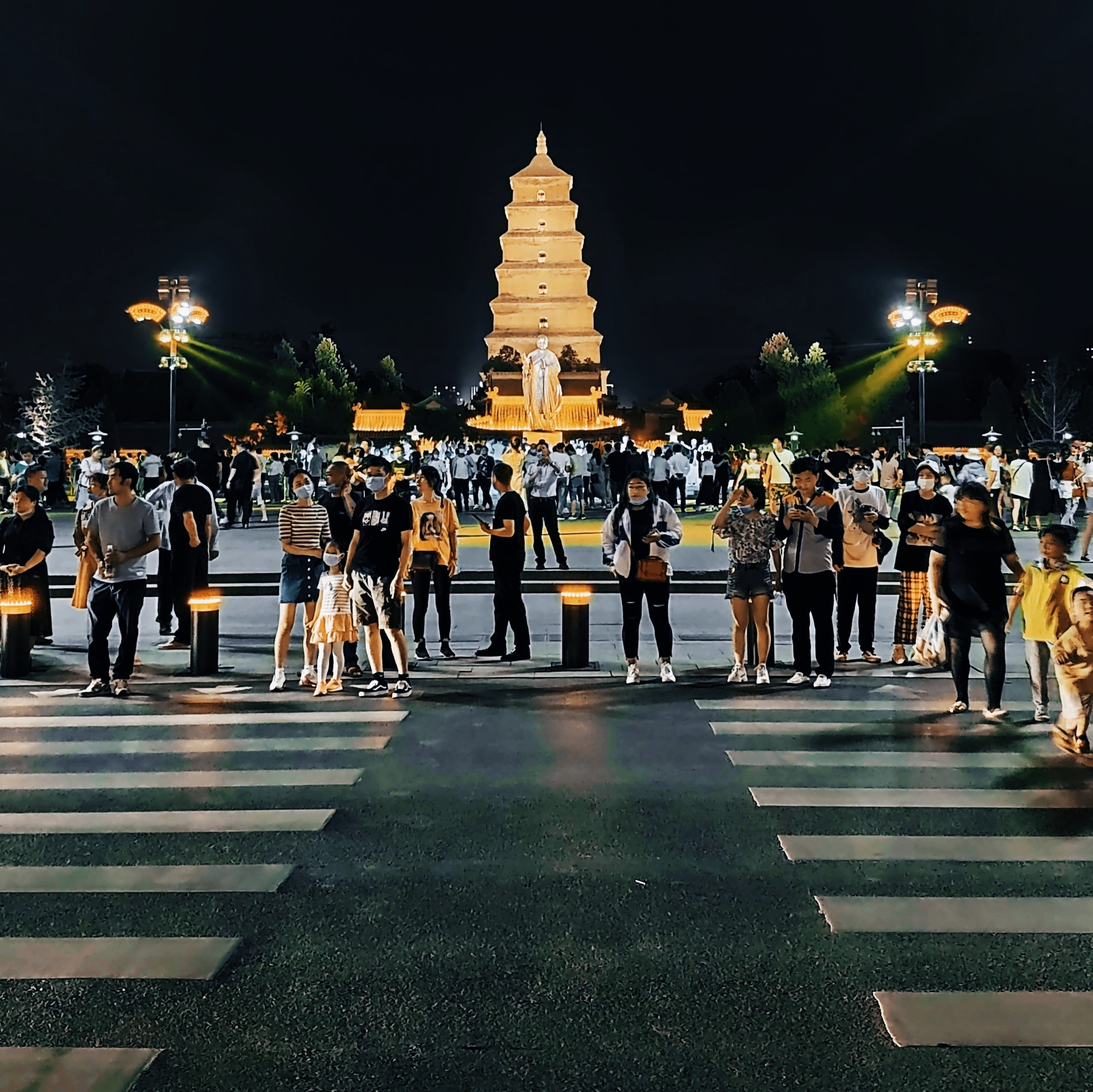
Night view of South Square of Dayan Pagoda in 2020

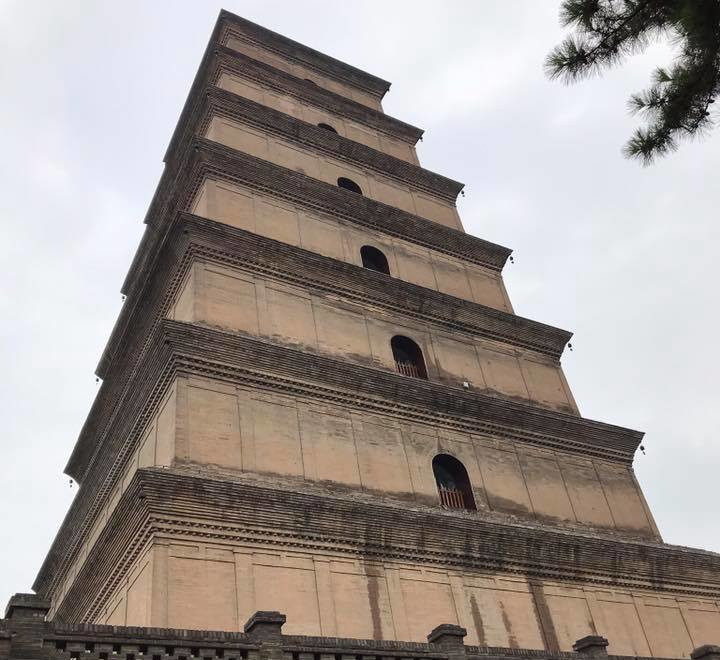
Side view, below

== See also ==
- List of tallest structures built before the 20th century
- Daci'en Temple
- Small Wild Goose Pagoda
