= Small Wild Goose Pagoda =

Pagoda in Xi'an, Shaanxi, China

- 小雁塔
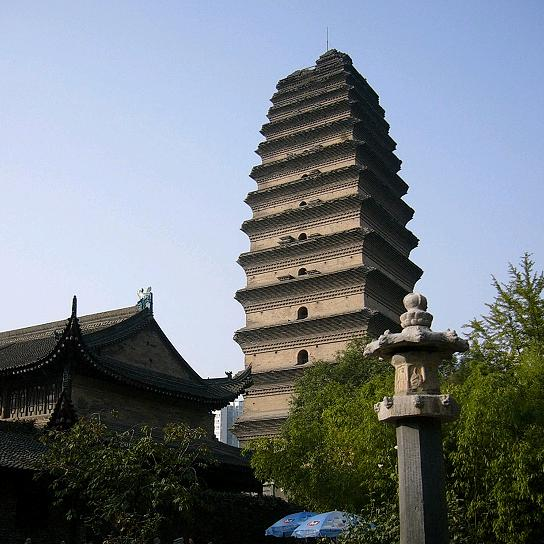
- Small Wild Goose Pagoda in Xi'an, China

- Xi'an, Shaanxi Province, China

Religion
- Affiliation: Buddhism

Location
- Country: China
- Coordinates: 34°14′26.9″N 108°56′14.6″E

Small Wild Goose Pagoda
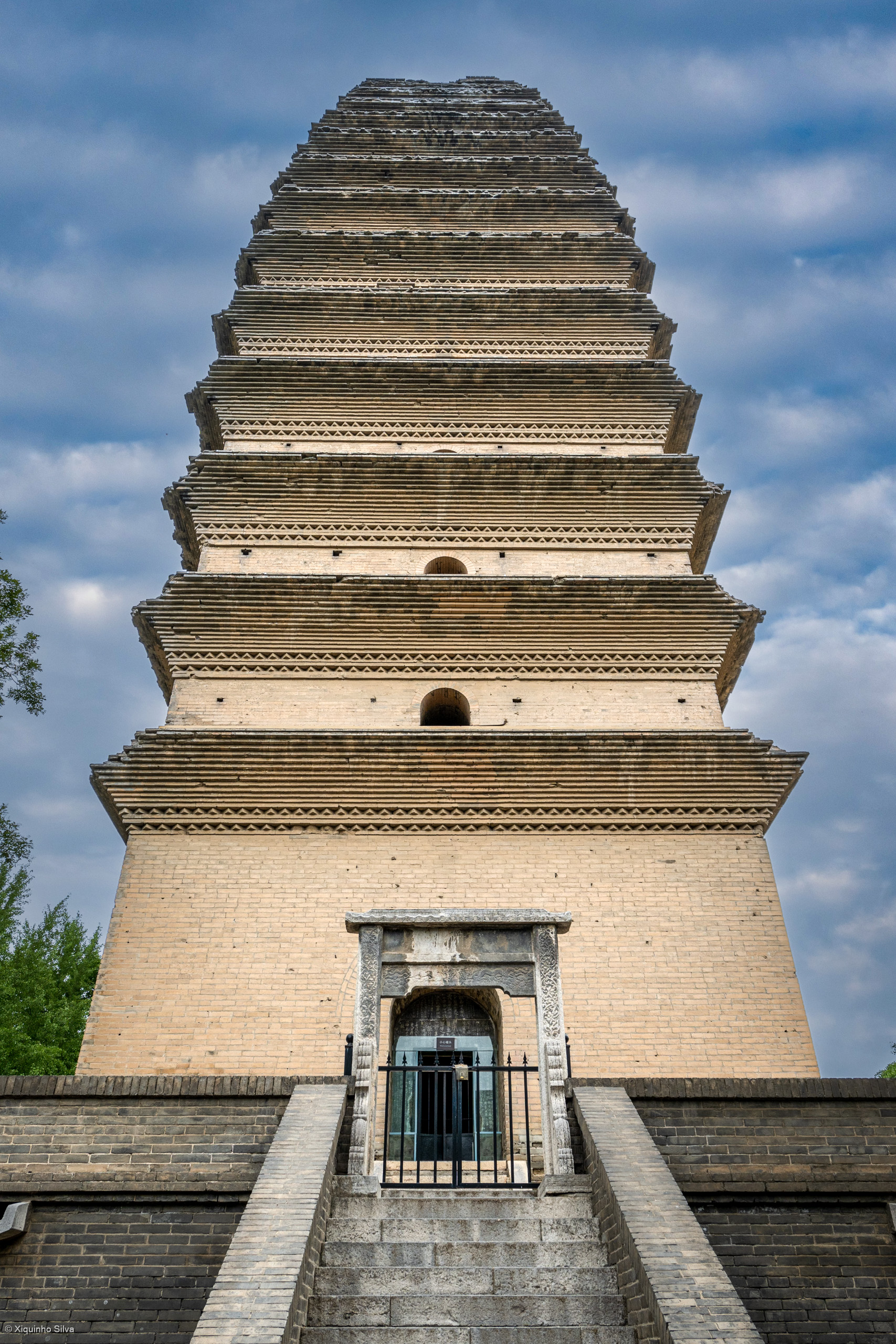
- Chinese: 小雁塔
- Literal meaning: Lesser Swan Goose Pagoda (as opposed to the Greater Wild Goose Pagoda)
Transcriptions
Standard Mandarin
- Hanyu Pinyin: Xiǎoyàntǎ
- Wade–Giles: Hsiao-yen-t'a

The Small Wild Goose Pagoda or Little Wild Goose Pagoda (Chinese: 小雁塔, Xiǎoyàn tǎ) is a Tang-dynasty brick pagoda in the former Jianfu Temple precinct in Xi'an, Shaanxi, China. It was built between 707 and 709, when the city was the imperial capital Chang'an, and was associated with the temple's translation of Buddhist texts brought from India.

The pagoda originally had fifteen storeys. Earthquake damage destroyed the upper two, leaving the present thirteen-storey structure, about 43.3 m (142 ft) high. Its dense tiers of eaves differ from the more massive, pavilion-like form of the Giant Wild Goose Pagoda. A bell installed at the temple became associated with "Morning Bell at the Wild Goose Pagoda", one of the traditional Eight Views of Guanzhong.

The pagoda was designated a Major National Historical and Cultural Site in 1961 and inscribed in 2014 as a component of the UNESCO World Heritage Site Silk Roads: the Routes Network of Chang'an-Tianshan Corridor. It now stands within the grounds of the Xi'an Museum, where the pagoda, temple remains, and museum collections can be visited together.

== History ==
The Small Wild Goose Pagoda was built between 707–709, during the Tang dynasty under Emperor Zhongzong of Tang (r. 705–710). The pagoda had fifteen stories and stood 45 metres (148 ft) until the 1556 Shaanxi earthquake, when it was damaged and reduced to its modern height of 43 metres (141 ft). The pagoda has a brick frame built around a hollow interior, and its square base and shape reflect the building style of other pagodas from the era.

During the Tang Dynasty, the Small Wild Goose Pagoda stood across a street from its mother temple, the Dajianfu Temple. Pilgrims brought sacred Buddhist writings to the temple and pagoda from India, as the temple was one of the main centers in Chang'an for translating Buddhist texts. The temple was older than the pagoda, since it was founded in 684, exactly 100 days after the death of Emperor Gaozong of Tang (r. 649–683). Emperor Zhongzong had donated his residence to the building of a new temple here, maintaining the temple for 200 monks in honor of his deceased father Gaozong. The temple was originally called the Daxianfusi or Great Monastery of Offered Blessings by Zhongzong, until it was renamed Dajianfusi by Empress Wu Zetian in 690.

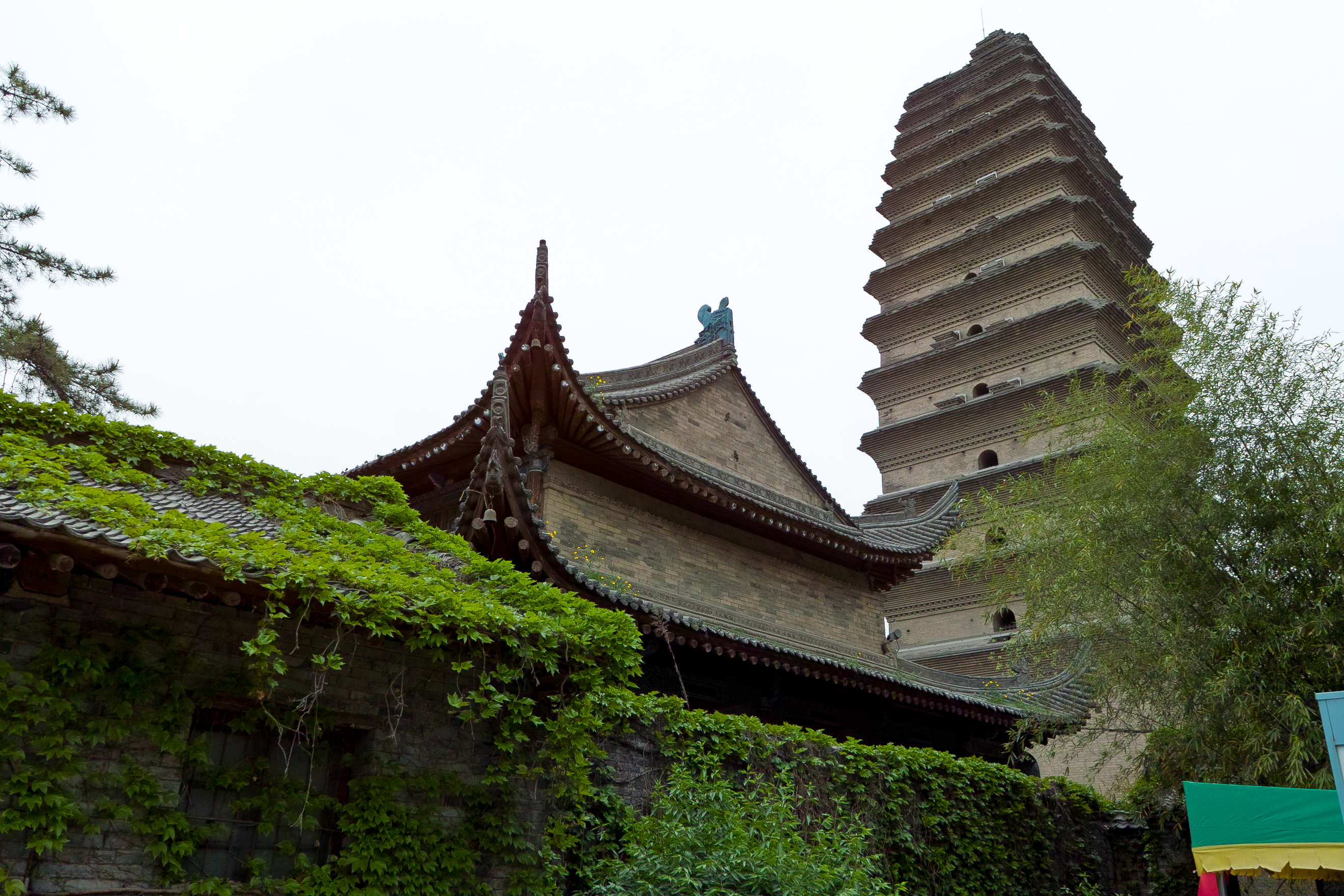

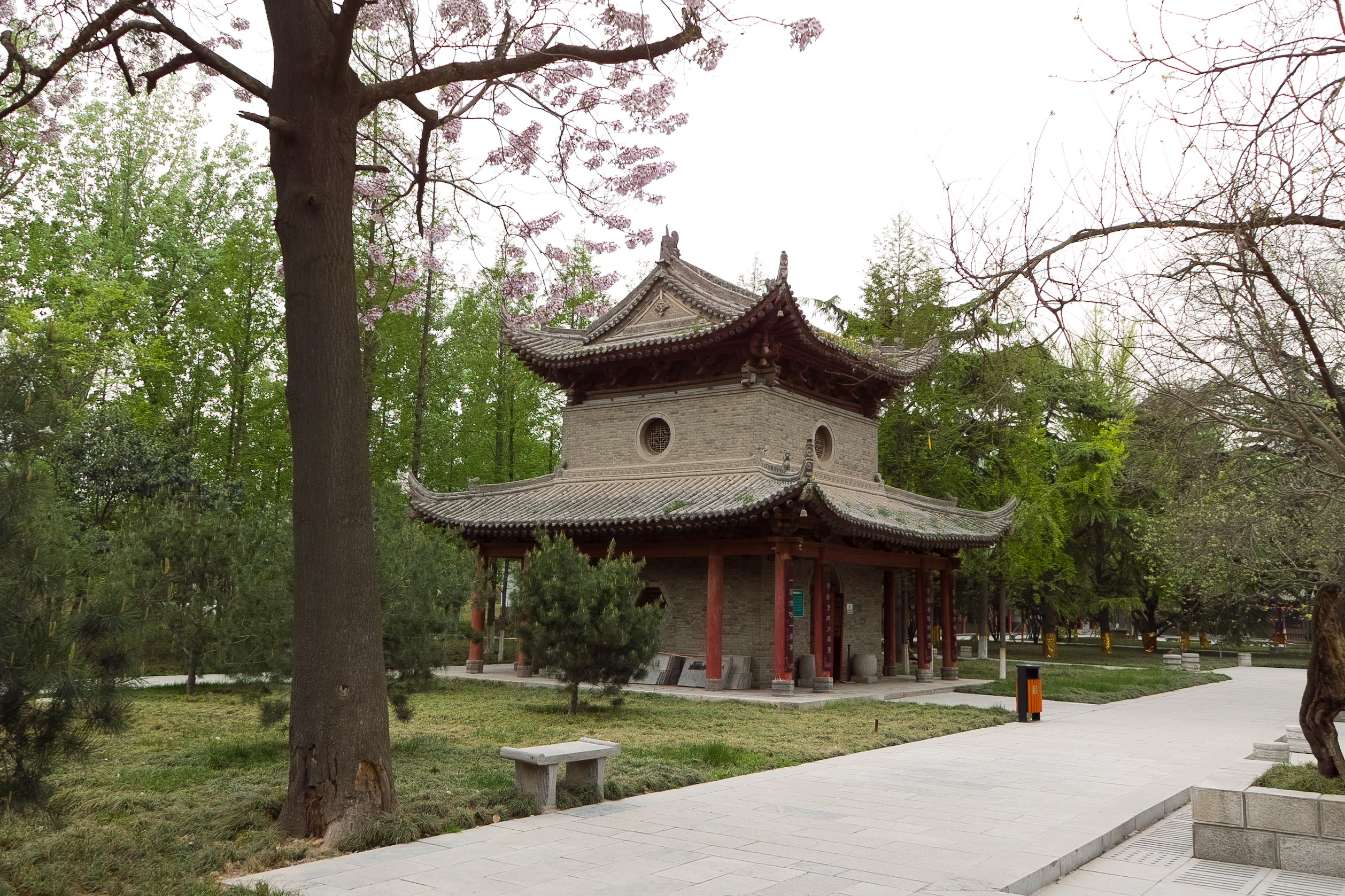

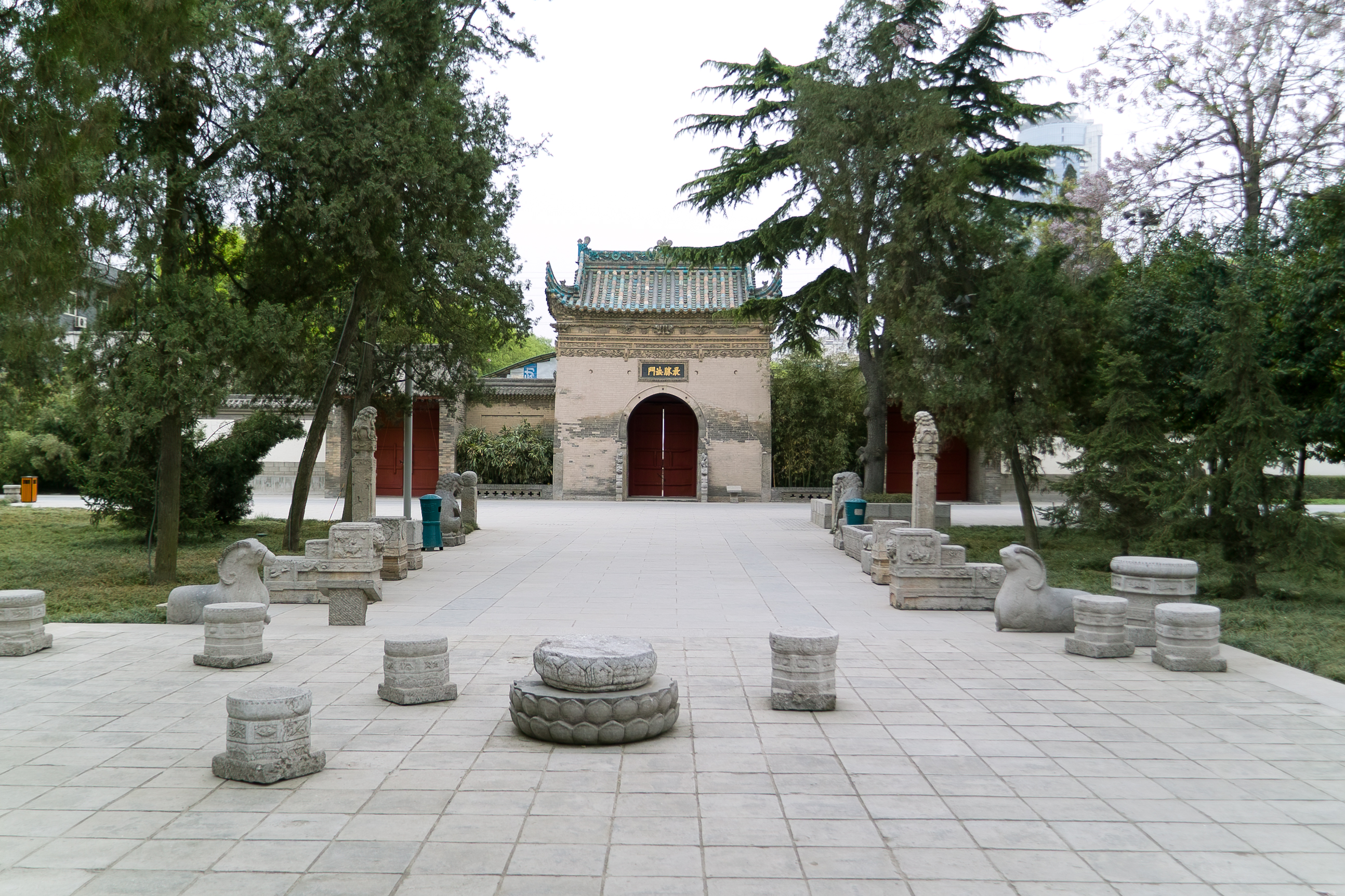

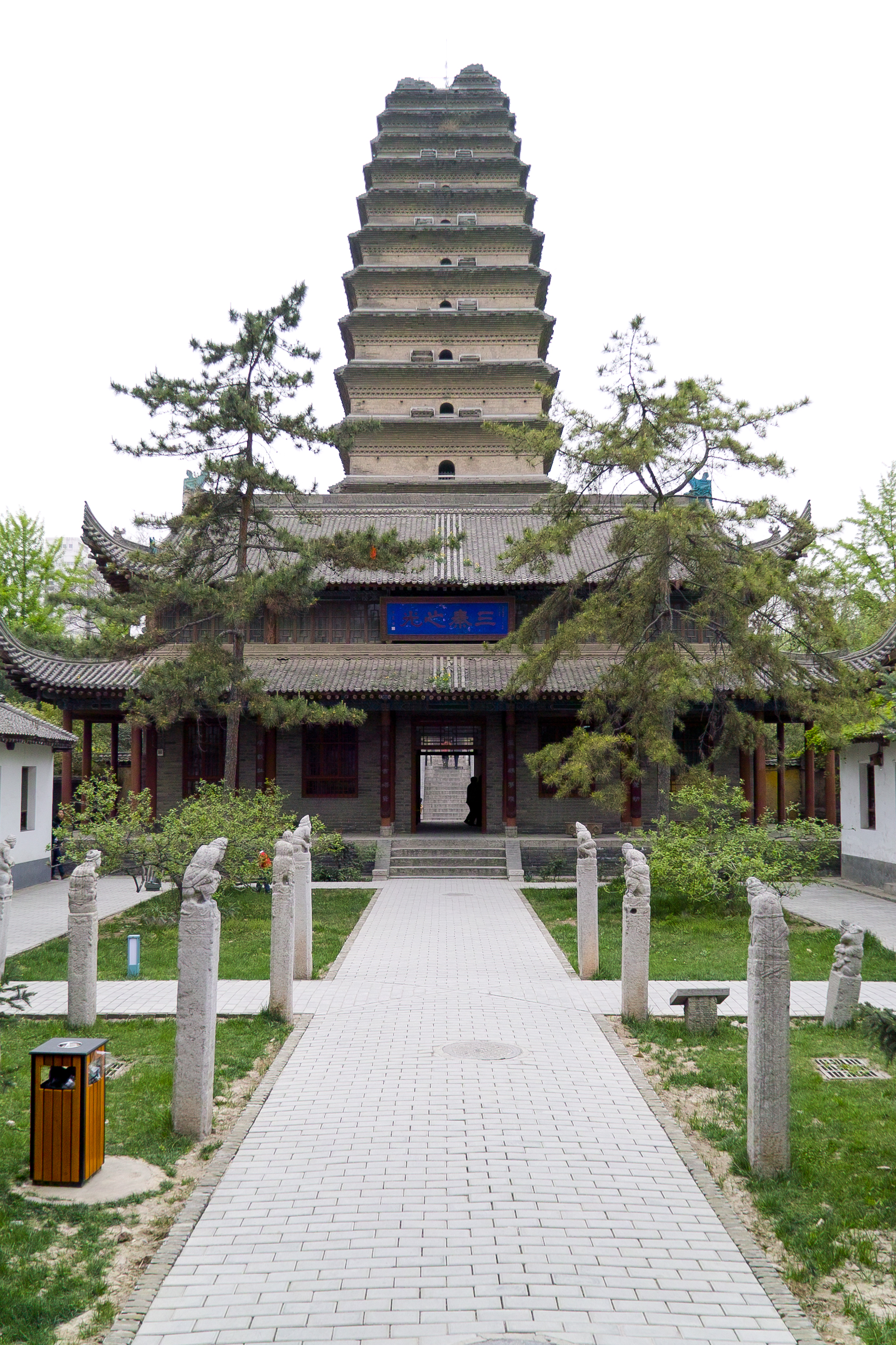

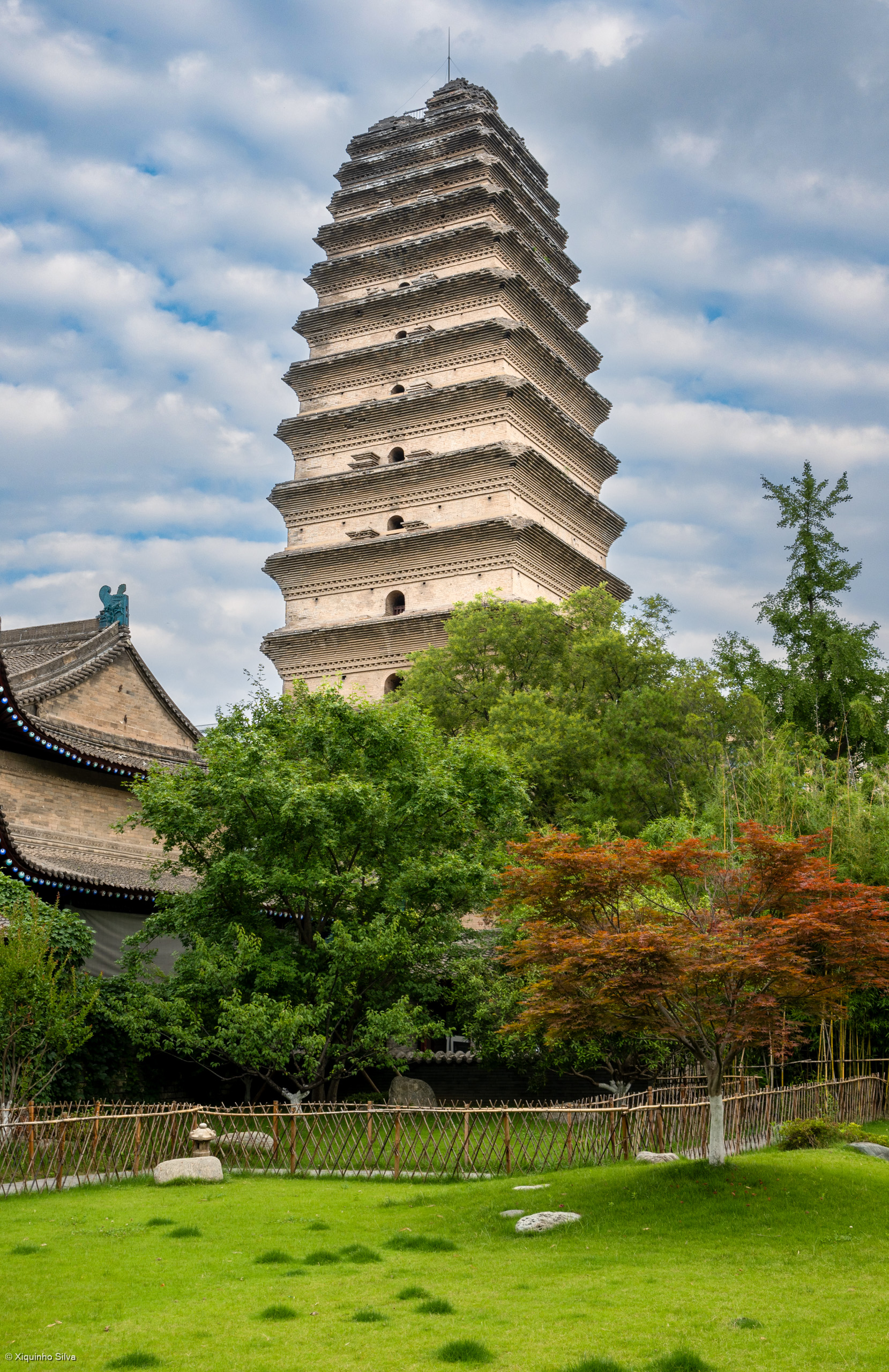

== Architecture ==
The Small Wild Goose Pagoda is a pagoda of the brick structure, consisting of an underground palace, the base, the body and eaves, and so on. The pagoda is a quadrangular. The top of the pagoda was destroyed two levels during the great earthquake in the 34th year of Jiajing of Ming Dynasty (1556), and the existing 13 levels. The total height of the pagoda was measured in 1989 as 43.4 meters, the bottom side was 11.38 meters long, and the ratio of height to bottom side was 100:26.

The first layer of the Small Wild Goose Pagoda opens a doorway in the north and south of the pagoda for access. The north and south doorframes are made of green stone. The frame of the stone gate is carved with typical Buddhist allegorical decorative motifs, such as the celestial beings and vines, auspicious clouds, and Jalinpura, reflecting the artistic style of the early Tang Dynasty.

== Bell ==
The bell was cast in the third year of Mingchang in the Jin Dynasty (1192) and is 3.55 meters high and weighs about 8,000 kilograms.

This bell was hanging in the Wugong Chongjiao Temple by the Wei River. When the Wei River flooded and the riverbed was diverted, the temple was destroyed by water and the bell sank in the river bank. During the Kangxi period of the Qing Dynasty, the bell was rediscovered and moved into the bell tower next to the Small Wild Goose Pagoda.

Every morning, the bell is rung regularly in the temple and can be heard for tens of miles. The "Morning Bell of Goose Pagoda" is known as one of the "Eight Scenes of Chang'an".

== See also ==
- Chinese architecture
- Giant Wild Goose Pagoda
- Great Tang Records on the Western Regions
- List of Buddhist temples
- Jianfu Temple
