= Daci'en Temple =

Notable Buddhist temple in Xi'an, China

- 大慈恩寺
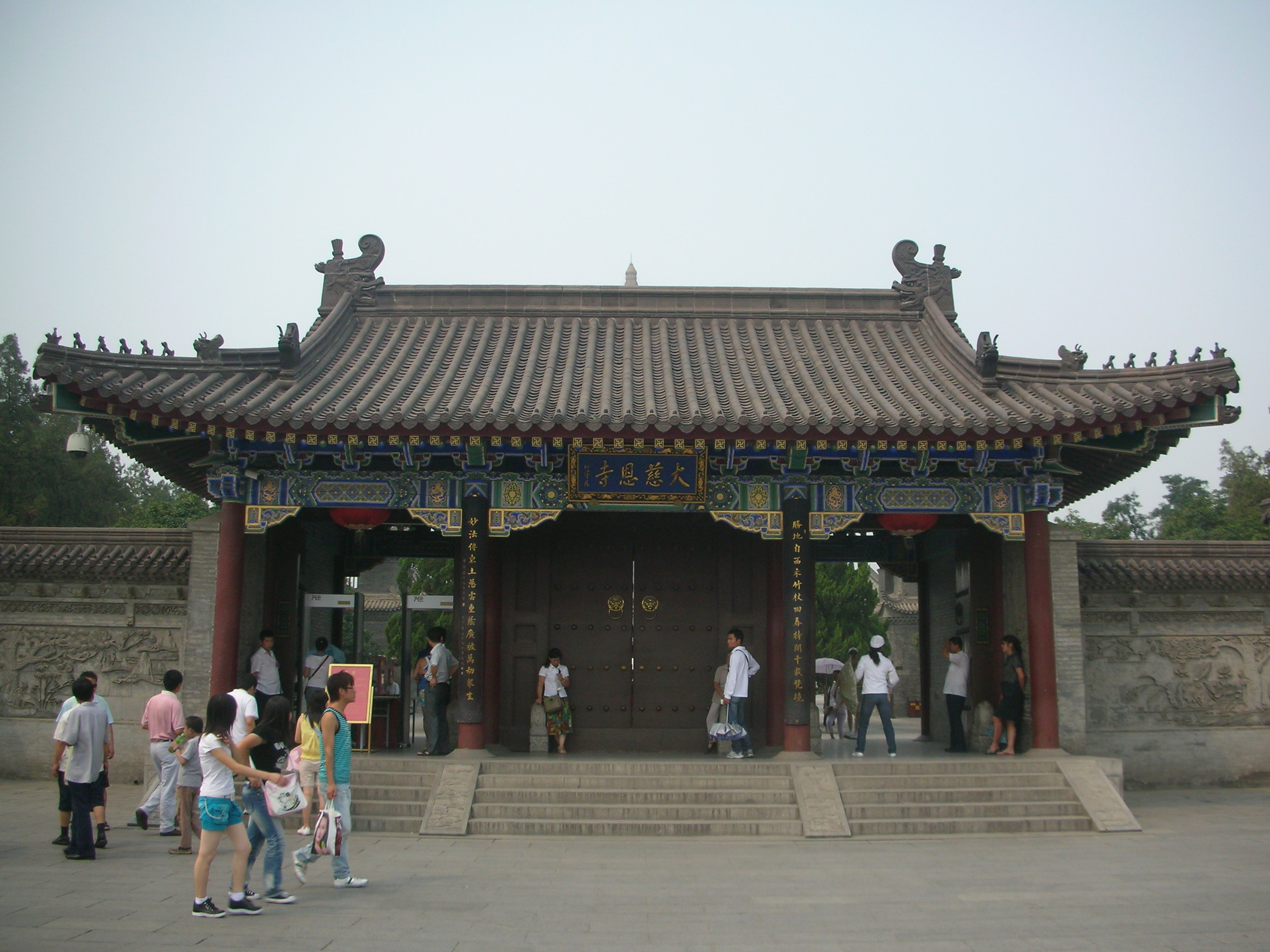
- The Shanmen at Daci'en Temple.

Religion
- Affiliation: Buddhism
- Sect: East Asian Yogācāra

Location
- Location: Yanta District, Xi'an, Shaanxi
- Country: China
- Interactive map of Daci'en Temple
- Coordinates: 34°13′26″N 108°58′14″E

Architecture
- Style: Chinese architecture
- Founder: Emperor Gaozong of Tang
- Funded by: Xuanzang
- Established: 648
- Completed: 1466 (reconstruction)

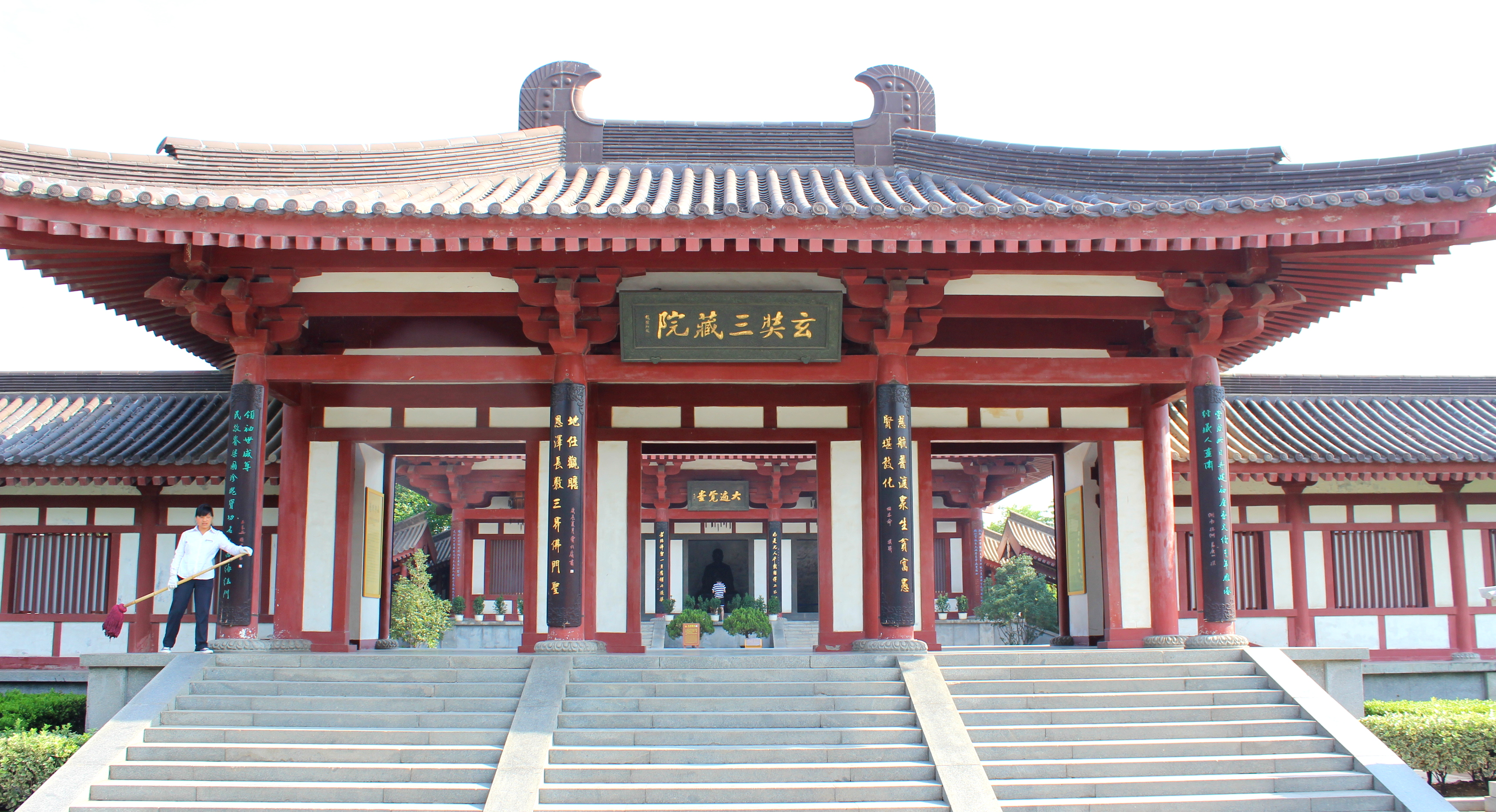
Xuanzang Sanzang Hall.

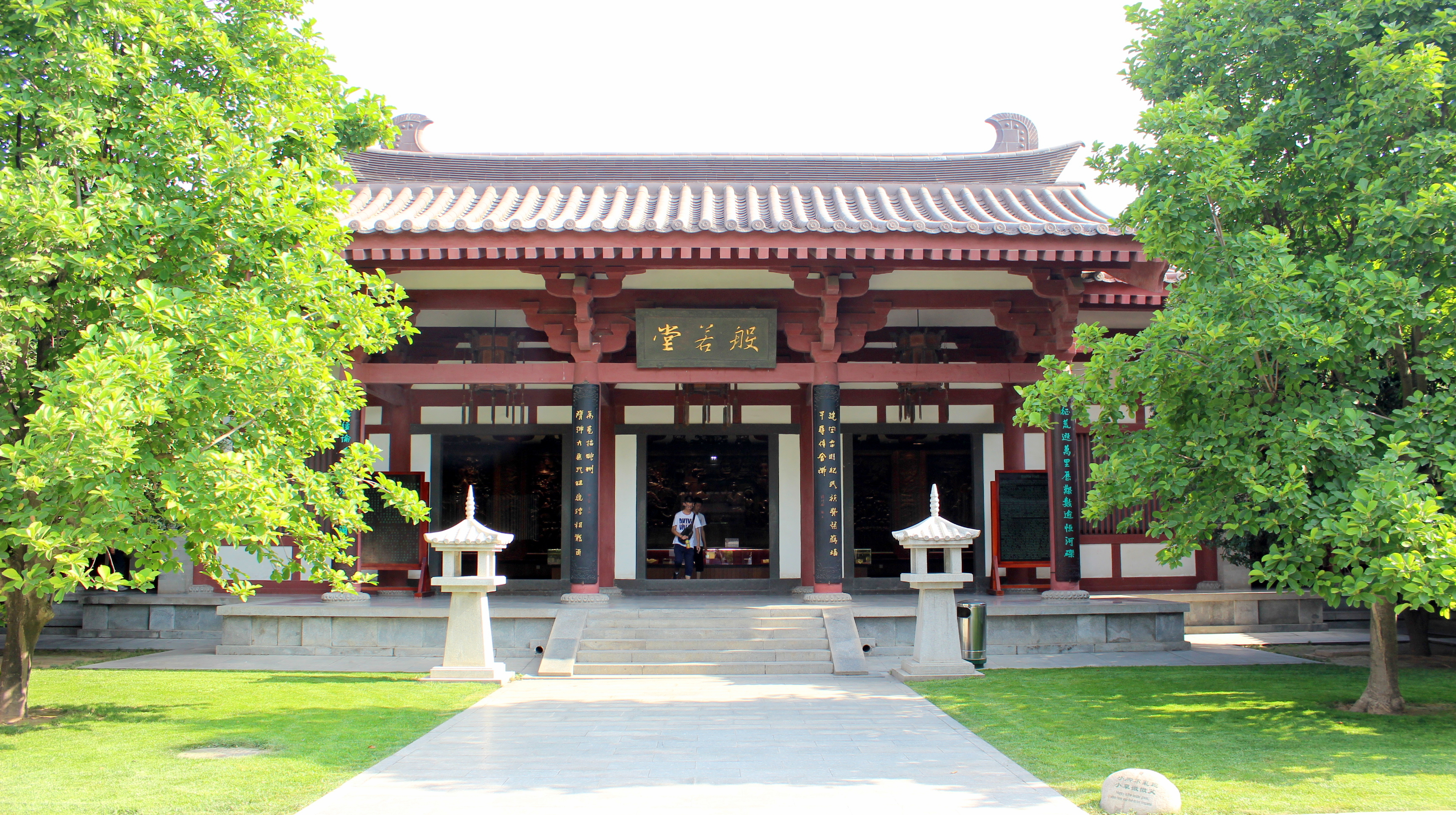
Bore Hall.

Daci'en Temple (Chinese: 大慈恩寺; pinyin: Dàcí'ēn Sì) is a Buddhist temple located in Yanta District, Xi'an, Shaanxi. The temple is the cradle of East Asian Yogācāra in China. It is notable for the Giant Wild Goose Pagoda. The pagoda was originally built under the supervision of the monk Xuanzang, whose pilgrimage to India inspired the novel Journey to the West. Alongside Daxingshan Temple and Jianfu Temple, it was one of the three sutras translation sites (三大译经场) in the Tang dynasty.

== History ==
Located in Jinchangfang (进昌坊) of Chang'an (today's Xi'an), the Daci'en Temple was first constructed in 648, in the 22nd year of Zhenguan period of the Tang dynasty (618–907). Prince Li Zhi, the later Emperor Gaozong of Tang, issued the decree building the temple in commemoration of his mother Empress Zhangsun. The renowned Buddhist monk Xuanzang was in charge of the temple, where he founded the East Asian Yogācāra in the Tang Empire. During his tenure, he managed the construction of the Giant Wild Goose Pagoda.

The temple was rebuilt in 1466, in the reign of Chenghua Emperor in the Ming dynasty (1368–1644).

On March 4, 1961, the temple was listed among the first group of the "Major National Historical and Cultural Sites in Shaanxi" by the State Council of China.

In 1983, the temple was authorized as a National Key Buddhist Temple in Han Chinese Area by the State Council of China.

In early 2001, it was categorized as an AAAA level tourist site by the China National Tourism Administration.

On June 22, 2014, the Giant Wild Goose Pagoda was added to UNESCO's list of World Cultural Heritage.

== Architecture ==
The complex include the following halls: Shanmen, Mahavira Hall, Hall of Four Heavenly Kings, Bell tower, Drum tower, Buddhist Texts Library, Xuanzang Sanzang Hall, Giant Wild Goose Pagoda, Pagodas Forest, etc.

=== Giant Wild Goose Pagoda ===
The Giant Wild Goose Pagoda, also called the Big Wild Goose Pagoda, the Great Wild Goose Pagoda and Dayan Pagoda. Was built by Xuanzang in 652. The 63.25-metre (207.5 ft) pagoda has the brick structure with seven stories and four sides of ancient Indian style. It has been renovated and redecorated several times since the Tang dynasty (618–907).

=== Mahavira Hall ===
The Mahavira Hall enshrining statues of Vairocana, Mahavairocana and Shakyamuni. The two disciples' statues are placed in front of the statue of Shakyamuni, on the east side is Mahākāśyapa and the west side is Ānanda. The statues of Eighteen Arhats sitting on the seats before both sides of the gable walls.

=== Xuanzang Sanzang Hall ===
The Xuanzang Sanzang Hall (玄奘三藏院) enshrines the Sarira of Xuanzang and houses a copper statue of Xuanzang. On the walls of the hall painted frescoes depict events from Xuanzang's life.

=== Pagodas Forest ===
The temple has almost 1,400 years of history, with nine pagodas, each enshrines the Buddhist relics of successive abbots of Daci'en Temple. Their names and birthdates are carved in their respective pagoda.

== National treasure ==
The temple houses 20 slices of the palm leaf manuscript, which were brought from ancient India by Xuanzang.
