= Zhang Jinqiu =

Chinese architect and professor

张锦秋
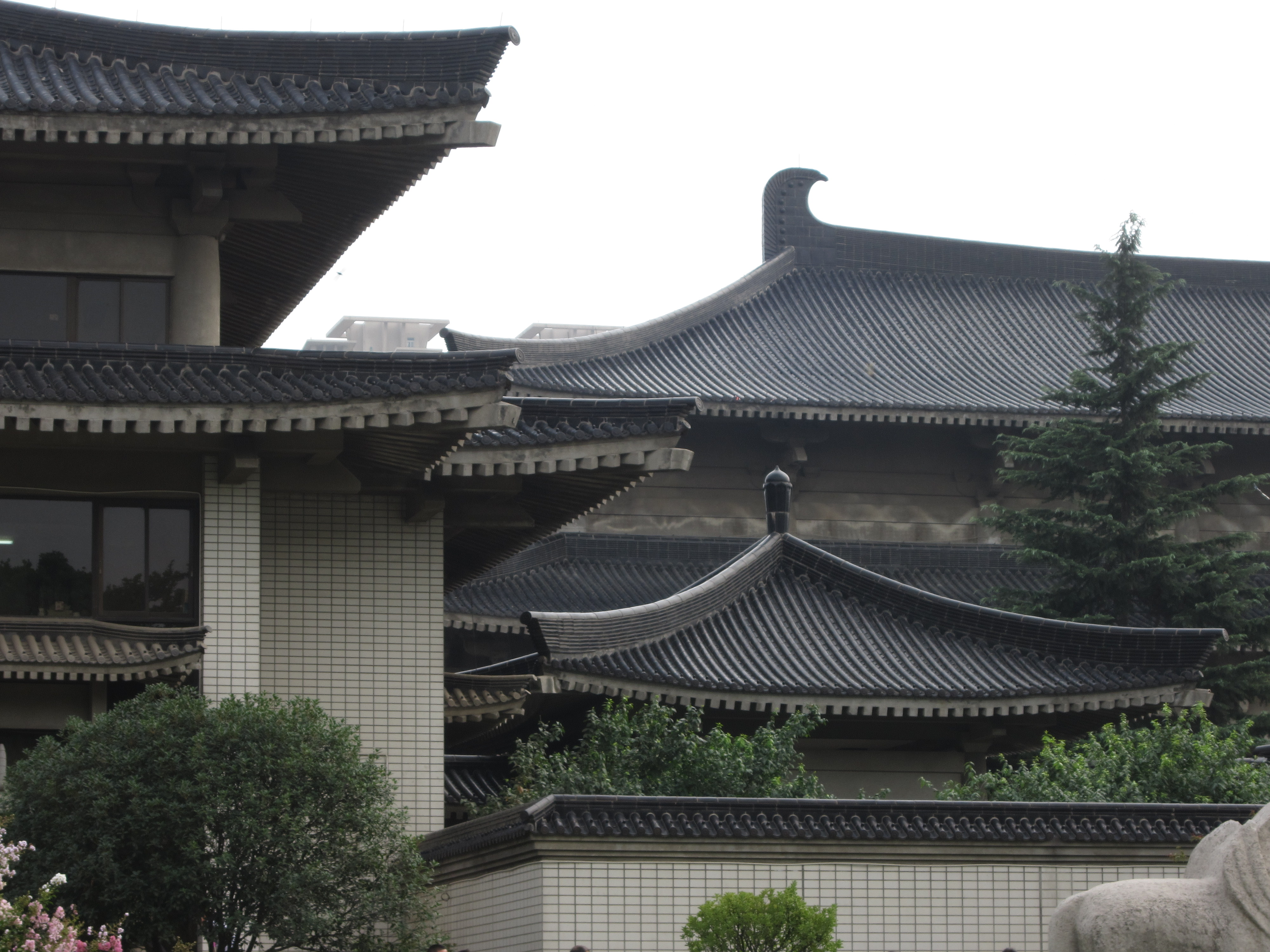
- Born: October 1936 (age 89); Chengdu, Sichuan
- Education: Tsinghua University
- Occupations: Architect and Professor

Zhang Jinqiu (simplified Chinese: 张锦秋; traditional Chinese: 張錦秋; pinyin: Zhāng Jǐnqiū) is a Chinese architect and professor at Tsinghua University. She was titled "Construction Master" (1991) and "Academician of China" (1994) by the Chinese government. She was appointed Chief Architect for China's Capital Construction Design Group in 1987 and has remained in this position until now. Zhang was also among the first round of winners of the Xi'an Science and Technology Award for Outstanding Contributions in 2005. By 2011, she was elected as a member of the prestigious Chinese Academy of Engineering.

== Early life and education ==
Zhang was born in Chengdu, Sichuan province, into a family that values education. Her aunt, Zhang Yuquan, is one of China's first generation of women architects. Her parents raised her "to have ambitions, to stand on my own two feet in society and not to rely on others." She was one year old when the Second Sino-Japanese War started and the Japanese invaded China. Her family was evacuated to a remote countryside known as Xipu.

Zhang graduated from Tsinghua University with a bachelor's degree in Architecture (1960) and a master's degree in Architectural History and Theory (1964). She developed her interests in traditional and modern architecture, studying under one of the pioneers of modern Chinese architecture, Liang Sicheng. Her search for a modern Chinese architectural language was not smooth sailing - Western and traditional Chinese architecture were rejected in the mid-1960s in favor of the Communist party's ideals. As academics, Zhang's family was assigned to Xi'an in 1966, at the start of the Cultural Revolution. After graduation, she was also assigned to work in Architectural Designing and Theoretical Pursuits at China's Architectural Designing Bureau of North-western Region in Xi'an. She eventually rose to the position of Director and earned the title of Chief Architect at China's Capital Construction Design Group in 1987. The Chinese government declared Zhang a Mastery Connoisseur in Architectural Designing.

== Design Work ==
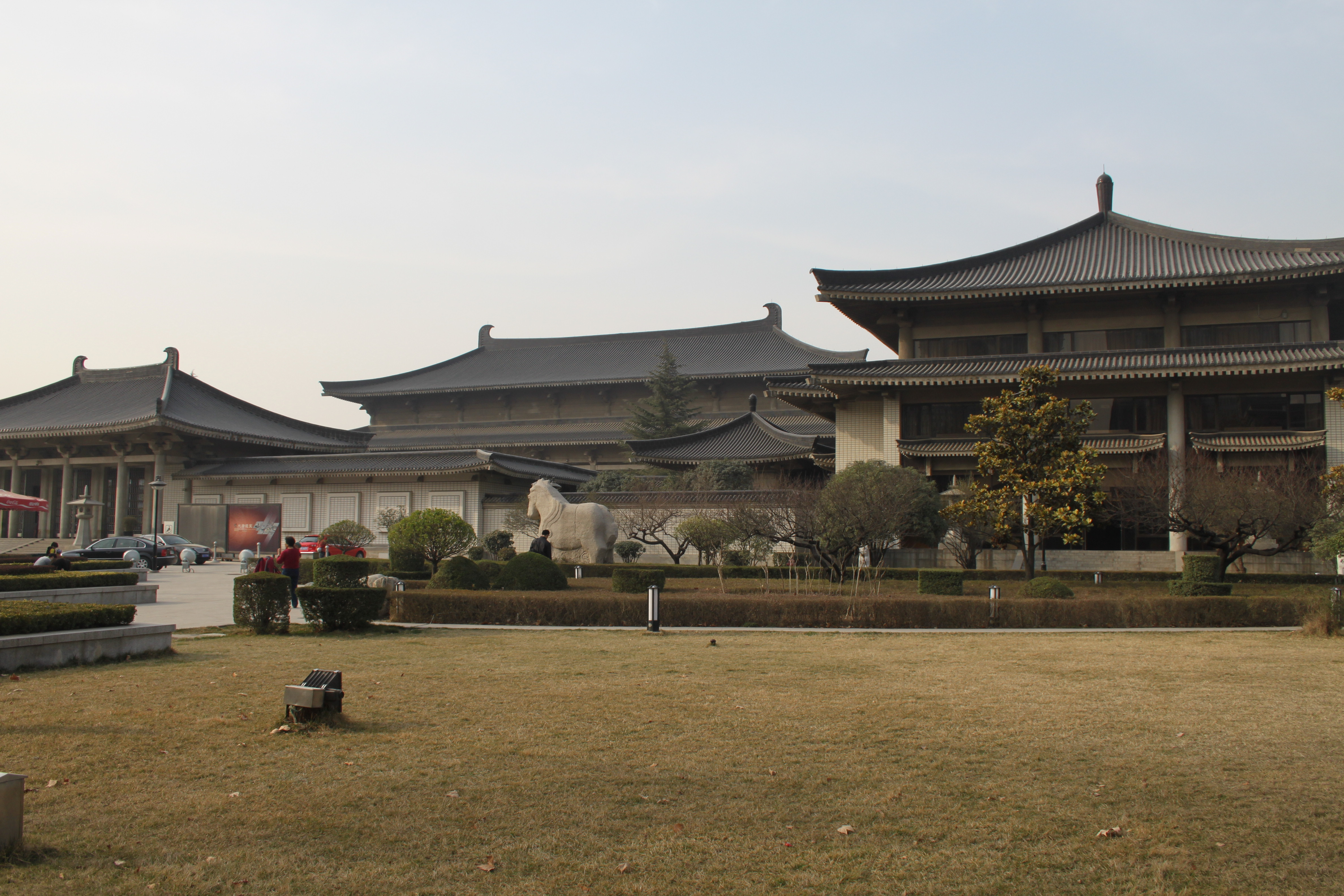
Exterior View of Shaanxi History Museum

For more than half a century, Zhang made her home in Xi'an, Shaanxi Province. Her works focus on the unity and harmonious relationship between science and aesthetics, as well as between vernacular and modern. In the 1970s, she undertook the restoration of the building structures and gardens of the Tang dynasty. Her ideas on utilising technological and scientific advancements were realised in her conservation and heritage projects, most notably the Shaanxi History Museum. The project is described as a modern architectural project in which traditional architectural elements are used as ingredients of innovation. Beyond revitalising the ancient city and its history, Zhang's designs present architectural features of the past in the modern context. This approach, often referred as the "Neo-Tang Style," gained popularity through her works. "The Tang style that I practice is a way of exploring diversified creations. I like different architectural designs as long as they suit the time, place, and theme at that time."

Zhang designed several contemporary landmark buildings in Xi'an, including the Shaanxi History Museum, Tang Lotus Garden and Famen Temple. She also participated in the design of the Beijing Revolutionary History Museum and the Chairman Mao Memorial Hall. Ms. Zhang and two Chinese female architects who have won the honorary title of "Architectural Master."

Zhang also insists on leaving historical traces and cultural charm in architectural design and treats historical and cultural heritage with heart and affection. "Modern and uncoordinated buildings cannot be built in old cities and protected areas, and in development areas, not all buildings should be built in the Zhou, Qin, Han and Tang styles." Zhang Jinqiu gave an example, "Today's high-tech zones and economic development zones can be built according to the functions of the new zones. To develop and construct high-rise buildings and modern glass curtain walls, but there must be restrictions next to the Big Wild Goose Pagoda and within the city walls."

== Projects ==
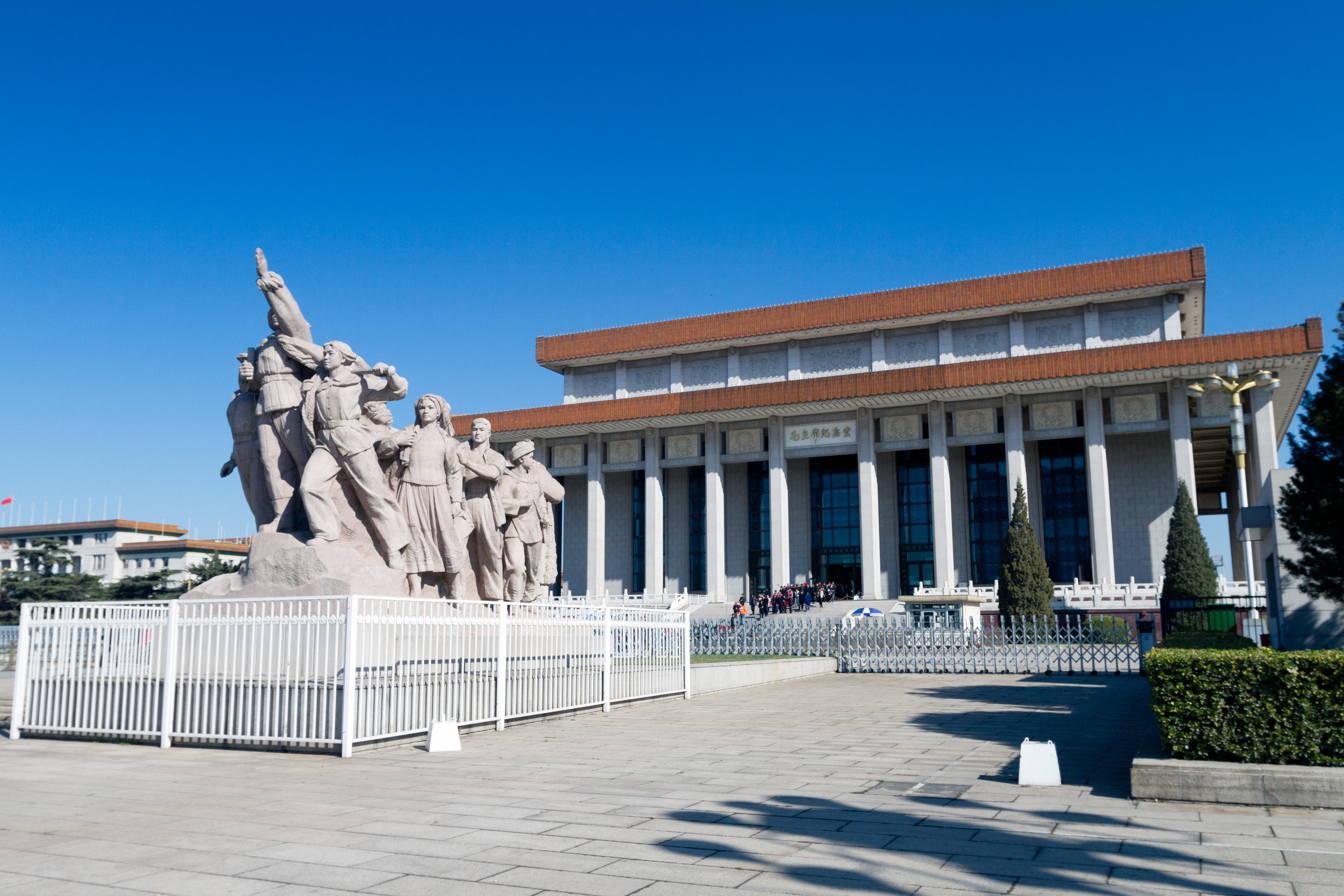
Exterior View of Chairman Mao Memorial Hall

The Huaqing Palace

Xi'an's Bell Tower and Drum Tower

Shaanxi History Museum

The Tang Lotus Garden

Main Hall of the Huandi Mausoleum

Famen Temple

Yan'an Revolutionary Memorial Hall

Beijing Revolution History Museum

Memorial Hall of Chairman Mao

== Awards ==
1994 awarded title of Academician of China.

2001 Liang Sicheng Architecture Award.

2005 Xian Science and Technology for Outstanding Contributions.

2010 Science and Technology Achievement Award.
