= Jianfu Temple =

Notable Buddhist temple in Xi'an, China

Coordinates: 34.2401°N 108.9373°E

South gate of Jianfu Temple

Jianfu Temple (simplified Chinese: 荐福寺; traditional Chinese: 薦福寺; pinyin: Jiànfú Sì) is a Chinese Buddhist temple located at West Youyi Rd. outside the south gate of Xi'an, Shaanxi Province, China. It hosts the famous Small Wild Goose Pagoda.

== History ==
Jianfu Temple was originally the residence of Emperor Zhongzong of the Tang dynasty before he became the emperor. It was converted to a temple on the 20th day of the 3rd lunar month in AD 684 (100 days after the death of Emperor Gaozong) in order to dedicate postmortem fortune to the deceased emperor. Thus it was named as "Xianfu Temple" (献福寺). In AD 690 during Wu Zetian's reign, it was renamed Jianfu Temple, and also bestowed an inscribed board handwritten by the emperor. The famous Small Wild Goose Pagoda was built in the Jinglong era (707-710) of the Tang dynasty. Initially, the pagoda courtyard resided outside the temple gate, rather than inside the temple, but it was still a part of Jianfu Temple. Under the wing of the Tang Empire, Jianfu Temple, together with Daci'en Temple, became prosperous. While in the Huichang era Buddhism was suppressed, Jianfu Temple was only allowed to keep 20 monks for daily maintenance, and it grievous days came. The temple suffered from the chaos of wars towards the end of the Tang dynasty, and was largely ruined. Only the Small Wild Goose Pagoda was preserved. According to historical records dating from the Yuanyou era of the Northern Song dynasty, Jianfu Temple had been moved into pagoda courtyard at that time, integrated with the Small Wild Goose Pagoda.

In the Ming dynasty, Jianfu Temple was reinvigorated. There were five times of large-scale renovations, largely preserving the original pattern. In 1426, a Tibetan monk, Shaosiji from Hongjue Temple of Xiningwei, Shaanxi Province, was awarded a certificate by the Ming government, and came to preside over Jianfu Temple. Seeing the dilapidated buildings in the temple, he swore to rebuild it. The reconstruction was completed in 1449, and Shaosiji appealed to government for its name. The current "Imperial Jianfu Temple" (敕赐荐福寺) was handwritten by the Zhengtong Emperor of the Ming dynasty.

Jianfu Temple was renovated many times in the Qing dynasty. The largest renovation occurred in the 31st year of the Kangxi era. In the late Qing dynasty, more buildings were erected, including the Cangjing Ge and Nanshan Gate.

== Historical relics ==
- Stone Inscriptions:
- Ancient Bells: A bell is preserved in the Bell Pavilion. It was built in 1192 during the Jin dynasty (1115–1234) and weighed 8,000 kilograms. More than a thousand characters are engraved on its surface. During period of the Republican era, this bell was broken by the army residing in the temple, so that the scene "Morning Bell of Goose Pagoda" receded from view for many years. In 1993, the historical relics office of Small Wild Goose Pagoda in Xi'an directed the rescue work and welded the bell. A new bell was forged in 1998 for tourists to hit.

In addition, there is a small iron bell hanging on the iron scaffold beside the Bell Pavilion. It was built in 1494.

- Ancient Pagoda Trees: There are more than 10 pagoda trees inside the temple, with age of over a thousand years.
