= Jiangcungou landfill =

Closed waste disposal site in Xi'an, China

Coordinates: 34°14′57″N 109°05′52″E

The Jiangcungou landfill was a waste disposal site in Xi'an, China. Constructed in 1994, it was closed in November 2019 after reaching its capacity, which was intended to be sufficient until 2044. At the time of its closure, it was the largest landfill in China at 700,000 square metres (170 acres). The waste disposal needs of Xi'an are planned to be met by a number of new incinerators.

== Operation ==
The Jiangcungou landfill is located in a suburb of Xi'an, the capital of China's Shaanxi province. It was constructed in 1994 and was one of seven landfills serving the city. The Jiangcungou landfill was intended to not reach capacity until 2044, accepting waste at a rate of 2,600 tonnes (2,600 long tons; 2,900 short tons) per day. The site covers 700,000 square metres (170 acres) and waste was buried in a layer up to 150 metres (490 ft) deep, providing a total capacity of 34,000,000 cubic metres (44,000,000 cu yd). The Jiangcungou landfill was China's largest landfill site at the time of its closure. The site was subject to complaints from residents living several kilometres away due to the smell it generated.

== Closure and replacement ==
The waste generated by the 8 million citizens served by the landfill was greater than expected, leading to capacity issues. By 2019 the landfill was accepting 10,000 tonnes (9,800 long tons; 11,000 short tons) of household waste per day, the most of any landfill site in the country. Of the seven landfills in Xi'an four are expected to be full in 2019/20 and the remaining three by 2021. The Jiangcungou landfill reached capacity in November 2019 and will be backfilled and converted into an ecological park.

China is moving away from landfills, which it has traditionally relied upon, and towards alternative means of waste disposal. There is a major move towards mandatory sorting of household waste, with the intention that 35% of all household waste in major cities will be recycled by the end of 2020. Mandatory sorting of household waste in Xi'an was implemented on 1 September 2019. Residents must separate kitchen waste for composting, hazardous waste for further processing and dry waste which will be incinerated. A new waste incinerator was completed in October 2019 and four more are planned to be built in 2020. Together they will be able to dispose of 12,750 tonnes (12,550 long tons; 14,050 short tons) of Xi'an's waste per day.
